= List of villages in Bhutan =

Villages in Bhutan are made up of groups of individual settlements, grouped together by chiwog for election purposes. This list is based mainly on information of the Election Commission, which not necessarily follows the general usage.

Village populations vary widely, from dozens to hundreds. Generally, greater numbers of villages within chiwogs indicate lower populations in the vast majority of those villages.

Villages in Bhutan are governed directly by Gewog (village block) governments, which in turn are subordinate to Dzongkhag (district) or Dungkhag (sub-district) governments. Villages in Bhutan may be distinguished from Thromdes (municipalities), which are larger settlements not part of any Chiwog, and which may be self-governing under the Local Government Act of Bhutan 2009. This Act also provides for the redrawing of chiwog borders and regrouping of villages by the Demarcation Commission in order to define relatively equally populated single member constituencies. Village and chiwog demarcations, therefore, are subject to considerable change.

Many village names are recurring, and may be shared even among neighboring settlements. Sometimes this indicates a large village spread among more than one chiwog. Geographical names frequently include: wom (Dzongkha: འོགམ་; "lower"), gom (སྒོངམ་; "upper/higher"), (kha)toed (སྟོད་; "upper [valley]"), (kha)maed (སྨད་; "lower [valley]"), nang (ནང་; "inner"), -gang (སྒང་; "hilltop, ridge"), -ling (གླིང་; "place"), -la (ལ་; "mountain pass"), -thang (ཐང་; "valley"), -pelri (དཔལ་རི་; "mountain"), -chhu (ཆུ་; "river"), and -dey (སྡེ་; "part, section"). Popular name parts also include choekhor (ཆོས་འཁོར་; "dharma wheel"), dekid (བདེ་སྐྱིད་; "peace"), phel (འཕེལ་; "flourish"), phuen (ཕུན་; "complete, perfect, wonderful"), tashi (བཀྲ་ཤིས་/བཀྲིས་; "auspicious"), goenpa (དགོན་པ་; "monastery"), lhakhang (ལྷ་ཁང་ "temple"), pema (པདྨ་; "lotus"), and norbu (ནོར་བུ་; "jewel"). Spelling variations are frequent; in government documents certain transliterations are equivalent: "oo" and "u;" "ay" and "ey;" and in some circumstances, "a" and "e."

== List of villages ==
The following are lists of villages in Bhutan by District as of 2011. Slashes indicate names combined names and disambiguations. Parenthetical names are alternative designations and may reflect a Nepali name.

=== Bumthang District ===
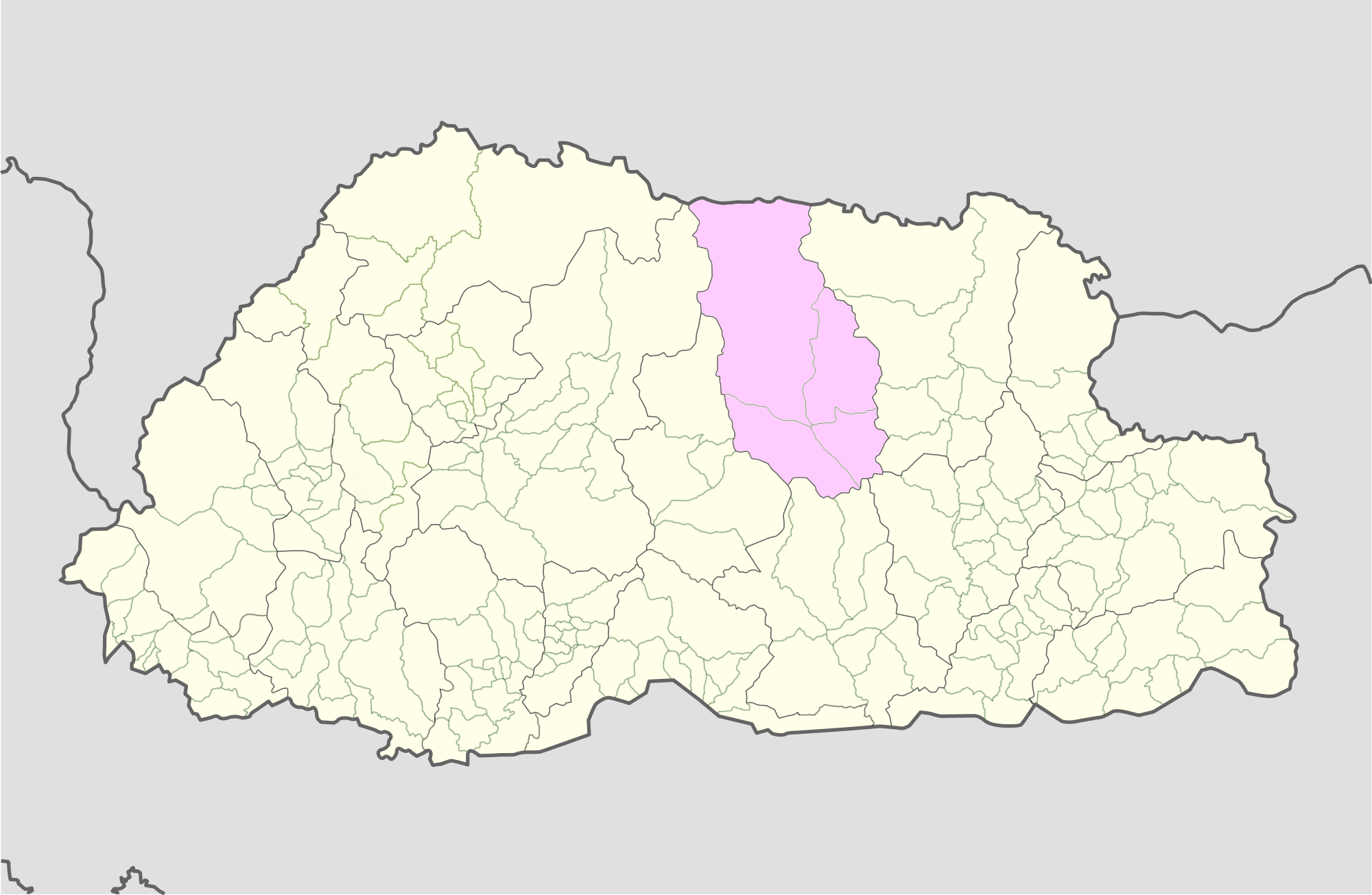
Bumthang District

Gewog	Chiwog	Village
Chhoekhor ཆོས་འཁོར་	Nangisphel Zangling Zhabjethang སྣང་སྲིད་འཕེལ་_བཟང་གླིང་_ཞབས་རྗེས་ཐང་	Damphel
Chhoekhor ཆོས་འཁོར་	Nangisphel Zangling Zhabjethang སྣང་སྲིད་འཕེལ་_བཟང་གླིང་_ཞབས་རྗེས་ཐང་	Dodrong
Chhoekhor ཆོས་འཁོར་	Nangisphel Zangling Zhabjethang སྣང་སྲིད་འཕེལ་_བཟང་གླིང་_ཞབས་རྗེས་ཐང་	Kangdok
Chhoekhor ཆོས་འཁོར་	Nangisphel Zangling Zhabjethang སྣང་སྲིད་འཕེལ་_བཟང་གླིང་_ཞབས་རྗེས་ཐང་	Nang Lhakang
Chhoekhor ཆོས་འཁོར་	Nangisphel Zangling Zhabjethang སྣང་སྲིད་འཕེལ་_བཟང་གླིང་_ཞབས་རྗེས་ཐང་	Samthang
Chhoekhor ཆོས་འཁོར་	Nangisphel Zangling Zhabjethang སྣང་སྲིད་འཕེལ་_བཟང་གླིང་_ཞབས་རྗེས་ཐང་	Saram
Chhoekhor ཆོས་འཁོར་	Nangisphel Zangling Zhabjethang སྣང་སྲིད་འཕེལ་_བཟང་གླིང་_ཞབས་རྗེས་ཐང་	Tashiling (Chokhor)
Chhoekhor ཆོས་འཁོར་	Nangisphel Zangling Zhabjethang སྣང་སྲིད་འཕེལ་_བཟང་གླིང་_ཞབས་རྗེས་ཐང་	Tendok
Chhoekhor ཆོས་འཁོར་	Nangisphel Zangling Zhabjethang སྣང་སྲིད་འཕེལ་_བཟང་གླིང་_ཞབས་རྗེས་ཐང་	Zangling
Chhoekhor ཆོས་འཁོར་	Nangisphel Zangling Zhabjethang སྣང་སྲིད་འཕེལ་_བཟང་གླིང་_ཞབས་རྗེས་ཐང་	Zhabjethang
Chhoekhor ཆོས་འཁོར་	Dhur Lusibee དུར་ལུ་སི་བི་	Druk Dok
Chhoekhor ཆོས་འཁོར་	Dhur Lusibee དུར་ལུ་སི་བི་	Dhur Lusibee
Chhoekhor ཆོས་འཁོར་	Dhur Lusibee དུར་ལུ་སི་བི་	Dhur Moen
Chhoekhor ཆོས་འཁོར་	Kharsa Thangbi མཁར་ས་_ཐང་སྦི་	Goling
Chhoekhor ཆོས་འཁོར་	Kharsa Thangbi མཁར་ས་_ཐང་སྦི་	Kharsa
Chhoekhor ཆོས་འཁོར་	Kharsa Thangbi མཁར་ས་_ཐང་སྦི་	Shukdak
Chhoekhor ཆོས་འཁོར་	Kharsa Thangbi མཁར་ས་_ཐང་སྦི་	Thangbi
Chhoekhor ཆོས་འཁོར་	Dawathang Dorjibi Kashingtsawa ཟླ་བ་ཐང་_རྡོ་རྗི་སྦིས་_ཀ་ཤིང་རྩ་བ་	Chakhar
Chhoekhor ཆོས་འཁོར་	Dawathang Dorjibi Kashingtsawa ཟླ་བ་ཐང་_རྡོ་རྗི་སྦིས་_ཀ་ཤིང་རྩ་བ་	Changwa
Chhoekhor ཆོས་འཁོར་	Dawathang Dorjibi Kashingtsawa ཟླ་བ་ཐང་_རྡོ་རྗི་སྦིས་_ཀ་ཤིང་རྩ་བ་	Dawathang
Chhoekhor ཆོས་འཁོར་	Dawathang Dorjibi Kashingtsawa ཟླ་བ་ཐང་_རྡོ་རྗི་སྦིས་_ཀ་ཤིང་རྩ་བ་	Dorjibe
Chhoekhor ཆོས་འཁོར་	Dawathang Dorjibi Kashingtsawa ཟླ་བ་ཐང་_རྡོ་རྗི་སྦིས་_ཀ་ཤིང་རྩ་བ་	Jamphel Lhakhang
Chhoekhor ཆོས་འཁོར་	Dawathang Dorjibi Kashingtsawa ཟླ་བ་ཐང་_རྡོ་རྗི་སྦིས་_ཀ་ཤིང་རྩ་བ་	Norbugang
Chhoekhor ཆོས་འཁོར་	Dawathang Dorjibi Kashingtsawa ཟླ་བ་ཐང་_རྡོ་རྗི་སྦིས་_ཀ་ཤིང་རྩ་བ་	Pangrey
Chhoekhor ཆོས་འཁོར་	Dawathang Dorjibi Kashingtsawa ཟླ་བ་ཐང་_རྡོ་རྗི་སྦིས་_ཀ་ཤིང་རྩ་བ་	Potola
Chhoekhor ཆོས་འཁོར་	Pedtsheling Tamshing པད་ཚལ་གླིང་_གཏམ་ཞིང་	Kenchosum
Chhoekhor ཆོས་འཁོར་	Pedtsheling Tamshing པད་ཚལ་གླིང་_གཏམ་ཞིང་	Kharsum
Chhoekhor ཆོས་འཁོར་	Pedtsheling Tamshing པད་ཚལ་གླིང་_གཏམ་ཞིང་	Pedtsheling
Chhoekhor ཆོས་འཁོར་	Pedtsheling Tamshing པད་ཚལ་གླིང་_གཏམ་ཞིང་	Tamshing
Chhoekhor ཆོས་འཁོར་	Pedtsheling Tamshing པད་ཚལ་གླིང་_གཏམ་ཞིང་	Torshong
Chhume ཆུ་མིག་	Gyaltsa རྒྱལ་རྩ་	Buli
Chhume ཆུ་མིག་	Gyaltsa རྒྱལ་རྩ་	Buli/Uru
Chhume ཆུ་མིག་	Gyaltsa རྒྱལ་རྩ་	Choda
Chhume ཆུ་མིག་	Gyaltsa རྒྱལ་རྩ་	Gyaltsa
Chhume ཆུ་མིག་	Gyaltsa རྒྱལ་རྩ་	Samtenling
Chhume ཆུ་མིག་	Gyaltsa རྒྱལ་རྩ་	Uru
Chhume ཆུ་མིག་	Gyaltsa རྒྱལ་རྩ་	Urudrangbi
Chhume ཆུ་མིག་	Domkhar དོམ་མཁར་	Domkhar
Chhume ཆུ་མིག་	Domkhar དོམ་མཁར་	Zincha
Chhume ཆུ་མིག་	Phurjoen ཕུར་བྱོན་	Chedeypang
Chhume ཆུ་མིག་	Phurjoen ཕུར་བྱོན་	Phurjoen
Chhume ཆུ་མིག་	Phurjoen ཕུར་བྱོན་	Thrometh
Chhume ཆུ་མིག་	Phurjoen ཕུར་བྱོན་	Ursang
Chhume ཆུ་མིག་	Zungngae ཟུང་ངས་	Pangteygoenpa
Chhume ཆུ་མིག་	Zungngae ཟུང་ངས་	Yamthrag
Chhume ཆུ་མིག་	Zungngae ཟུང་ངས་	Nangar
Chhume ཆུ་མིག་	Zungngae ཟུང་ངས་	Trakar
Chhume ཆུ་མིག་	Zungngae ཟུང་ངས་	Thrometh (Samling)
Chhume ཆུ་མིག་	Zungngae ཟུང་ངས་	Zugney
Chhume ཆུ་མིག་	Zungngae ཟུང་ངས་	Zugney (Chorten Nengpa)
Chhume ཆུ་མིག་	Choongphel ཅུང་འཕེལ་	Bhim
Chhume ཆུ་མིག་	Choongphel ཅུང་འཕེལ་	Choongphel
Chhume ཆུ་མིག་	Choongphel ཅུང་འཕེལ་	Terzok
Chhume ཆུ་མིག་	Choongphel ཅུང་འཕེལ་	Tharpaling
Chhume ཆུ་མིག་	Choongphel ཅུང་འཕེལ་	Yerangbi
Chhume ཆུ་མིག་	Choongphel ཅུང་འཕེལ་	Zhurey
Tang སྟང་	Tadingang རྟ་མཁྲི་སྒང་	Tandigang
Tang སྟང་	Khangrab ཁང་རབས་	Benzabi
Tang སྟང་	Khangrab ཁང་རབས་	Chhutoe
Tang སྟང་	Khangrab ཁང་རབས་	Gambling
Tang སྟང་	Khangrab ཁང་རབས་	Khangrab
Tang སྟང་	Khangrab ཁང་རབས་	Khoyar
Tang སྟང་	Khangrab ཁང་རབས་	Namkha
Tang སྟང་	Khangrab ཁང་རབས་	Shobugoenpa
Tang སྟང་	Khangrab ཁང་རབས་	Tashiling (Tang)
Tang སྟང་	Khangrab ཁང་རབས་	Ugyenchholing
Tang སྟང་	Kidzom Nyimalung སྐྱིད་འཛོམས་_ཉི་མ་ལུང་	Chojam
Tang སྟང་	Kidzom Nyimalung སྐྱིད་འཛོམས་_ཉི་མ་ལུང་	Gangju
Tang སྟང་	Kidzom Nyimalung སྐྱིད་འཛོམས་_ཉི་མ་ལུང་	Kidzom
Tang སྟང་	Kidzom Nyimalung སྐྱིད་འཛོམས་_ཉི་མ་ལུང་	Nangnang
Tang སྟང་	Kidzom Nyimalung སྐྱིད་འཛོམས་_ཉི་མ་ལུང་	Nimalung
Tang སྟང་	Kidzom Nyimalung སྐྱིད་འཛོམས་_ཉི་མ་ལུང་	Tralang
Tang སྟང་	Kidzom Nyimalung སྐྱིད་འཛོམས་_ཉི་མ་ལུང་	Sameth
Tang སྟང་	Dazur མདའ་ཟུར་	Dazur
Tang སྟང་	Dazur མདའ་ཟུར་	Jamshong
Tang སྟང་	Dazur མདའ་ཟུར་	Jog
Tang སྟང་	Dazur མདའ་ཟུར་	Misserthang
Tang སྟང་	Dazur མདའ་ཟུར་	Pangshing
Tang སྟང་	Dazur མདའ་ཟུར་	Rimochen
Tang སྟང་	Bezur Kuenzangdrag སྦས་ཟུར་_ཀུན་བཟང་བྲག་	Bezur
Tang སྟང་	Bezur Kuenzangdrag སྦས་ཟུར་_ཀུན་བཟང་བྲག་	Kuenzangdrang
Tang སྟང་	Bezur Kuenzangdrag སྦས་ཟུར་_ཀུན་བཟང་བྲག་	Phom Drong
Ura ཨུ་ར་	Beteng Pangkhar Soomthrang སྦེ་སྟེང་_སྤང་མཁར་_སུམ་ཕྲང་	Beteng
Ura ཨུ་ར་	Beteng Pangkhar Soomthrang སྦེ་སྟེང་_སྤང་མཁར་_སུམ་ཕྲང་	Pangkhar
Ura ཨུ་ར་	Beteng Pangkhar Soomthrang སྦེ་སྟེང་_སྤང་མཁར་_སུམ་ཕྲང་	Soomthrang
Ura ཨུ་ར་	Tangsibi སྟངས་སི་སྦི་	Tansibi
Ura ཨུ་ར་	Shing-Nyer ཤིང་གཉེར་	Sing-nyer
Ura ཨུ་ར་	Ura-Dozhi ཨུ་ར་མདོ་བཞི་	Ura-Charipa
Ura ཨུ་ར་	Ura-Dozhi ཨུ་ར་མདོ་བཞི་	Ura-Tarshong
Ura ཨུ་ར་	Ura-Dozhi ཨུ་ར་མདོ་བཞི་	Ura-Toepda
Ura ཨུ་ར་	Ura-Dozhi ཨུ་ར་མདོ་བཞི་	Ura-Trab Krispai
Ura ཨུ་ར་	Singkhar ཤིང་མཁར་	Shingkhar

=== Chukha District ===
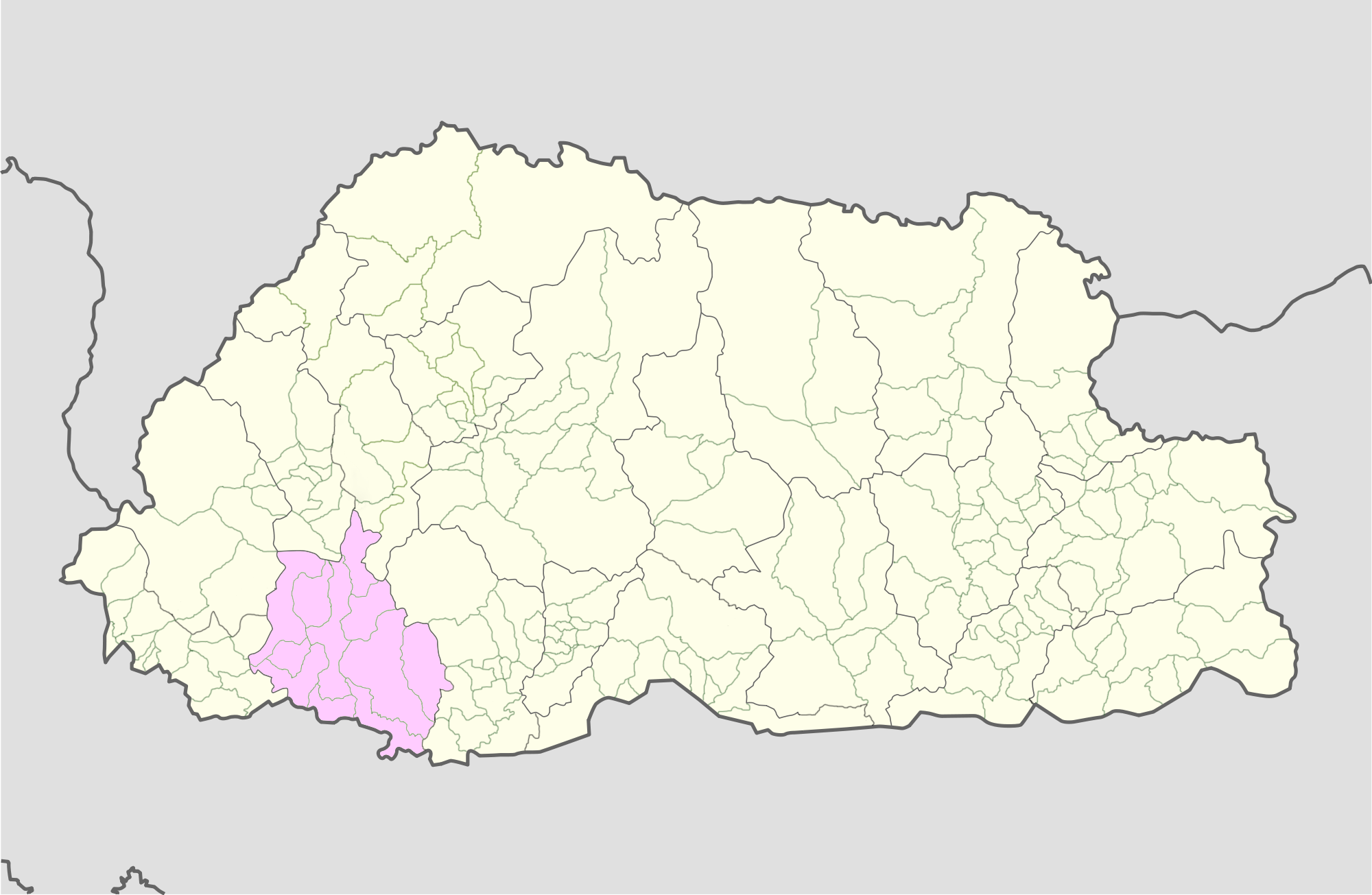
Chukha District

Gewog	Chiwog	Village
Bjachho བྱག་ཕྱོགས་	Bjagchhog བྱག་ཕྱོགས་	Bjagchhog
Bjachho བྱག་ཕྱོགས་	Tsimakha Tsimasham བརྩི་མ་ཁ་_བརྩི་མ་གཤམ་	Tsimakha
Bjachho བྱག་ཕྱོགས་	Tsimakha Tsimasham བརྩི་མ་ཁ་_བརྩི་མ་གཤམ་	Tsimasham
Bjachho བྱག་ཕྱོགས་	Mebisa མེ་སྦི་ས་	Mebisa
Bjachho བྱག་ཕྱོགས་	Tashi Gatshel བཀྲིས་དགའ་ཚལ་	Tashi Gatshel
Bjachho བྱག་ཕྱོགས་	Wangkha ལྦང་ཁ་	Wangkha
Bongo སྦོང་སྒོར་	Togtokha Togtogongm རྟོག་རྟོ་ཁ་_རྟོག་རྟོ་གོངམ་	Togtokha
Bongo སྦོང་སྒོར་	Choongkha Chhasilakha སྐྱུང་ཁ་_ཆཱ་སི་ལ་ཁ་	Choongkha
Bongo སྦོང་སྒོར་	Choongkha Chhasilakha སྐྱུང་ཁ་_ཆཱ་སི་ལ་ཁ་	Chhasilakha
Bongo སྦོང་སྒོར་	Gedu Miritsemo དགེ་འདུ་_མི་རི་རྩེ་མོ་	Gedu
Bongo སྦོང་སྒོར་	Gedu Miritsemo དགེ་འདུ་_མི་རི་རྩེ་མོ་	Jurma
Bongo སྦོང་སྒོར་	Gedu Miritsemo དགེ་འདུ་_མི་རི་རྩེ་མོ་	Boeri
Bongo སྦོང་སྒོར་	Gedu Miritsemo དགེ་འདུ་_མི་རི་རྩེ་མོ་	Miritsemo
Bongo སྦོང་སྒོར་	Gedu Miritsemo དགེ་འདུ་_མི་རི་རྩེ་མོ་	Pakshikha
Bongo སྦོང་སྒོར་	Ketogkha སྐད་ལྟོག་ཁ་	Damji
Bongo སྦོང་སྒོར་	Ketogkha སྐད་ལྟོག་ཁ་	Ketogkha
Bongo སྦོང་སྒོར་	Bongo Phasooma སྦོང་སྒོར་_ཕ་སུ་མ་	Bongo
Bongo སྦོང་སྒོར་	Bongo Phasooma སྦོང་སྒོར་_ཕ་སུ་མ་	Junglay
Bongo སྦོང་སྒོར་	Bongo Phasooma སྦོང་སྒོར་_ཕ་སུ་མ་	Phashooma
Bongo སྦོང་སྒོར་	Bongo Phasooma སྦོང་སྒོར་_ཕ་སུ་མ་	Zamsa
Bongo སྦོང་སྒོར་	Baeyuel Kunzang སྦས་ཡུལ་ཀུན་བཟང་	Baeyuel Kunzang
Chapcha སྐྱབས་ཆ་	Pagga སྤག་དགའ་	Pagga
Chapcha སྐྱབས་ཆ་	Pagga སྤག་དགའ་	Pagga Goenpa
Chapcha སྐྱབས་ཆ་	Tshamdrag མཚམས་བྲག་	Jongzhi
Chapcha སྐྱབས་ཆ་	Tshamdrag མཚམས་བྲག་	Metep
Chapcha སྐྱབས་ཆ་	Tshamdrag མཚམས་བྲག་	Tsamdrag
Chapcha སྐྱབས་ཆ་	Gangkha Shelyuel སྒང་ཁ་_ཤེལ་ཡུལ་	Gangkha
Chapcha སྐྱབས་ཆ་	Gangkha Shelyuel སྒང་ཁ་_ཤེལ་ཡུལ་	Shelgoan
Chapcha སྐྱབས་ཆ་	Gangkha Shelyuel སྒང་ཁ་_ཤེལ་ཡུལ་	Sheyuel
Chapcha སྐྱབས་ཆ་	Dokharchhu Rimtekha རྡོ་མཁར་ཆུ་_རིམ་སྟེ་ཁ་	Dorgoen
Chapcha སྐྱབས་ཆ་	Dokharchhu Rimtekha རྡོ་མཁར་ཆུ་_རིམ་སྟེ་ཁ་	Rimtekha
Chapcha སྐྱབས་ཆ་	Lang Nyelsa གླང་ཉལ་ས་	Lang Nyelsa
Chapcha སྐྱབས་ཆ་	Bunakha སྦུ་ན་ཁ་	Bunakha
Darla དར་ལ་	Tagp-thang-boog སྟགཔ་ཐང་སྦུག་	Dangreyboog (Bich Darla)
Darla དར་ལ་	Tagp-thang-boog སྟགཔ་ཐང་སྦུག་	Tagp-thang-boog (Bich Saureni)
Darla དར་ལ་	Tagp-thang-boog སྟགཔ་ཐང་སྦུག་	Khamaedthapang (Lower Saureni)
Darla དར་ལ་	Tagp-thang-boog སྟགཔ་ཐང་སྦུག་	Norgangtoed
Darla དར་ལ་	Nyimgang Tabji ཉིམ་སྒང་_སྟབས་ཇི་	Nyimgang (Ghamdara)
Darla དར་ལ་	Nyimgang Tabji ཉིམ་སྒང་_སྟབས་ཇི་	Tabji
Darla དར་ལ་	Nyimgang Tabji ཉིམ་སྒང་_སྟབས་ཇི་	Rinchhentse (Gurung Goan)
Darla དར་ལ་	Gengu Yagang གྱན་གུ་_ཡ་སྒང་	Chhumedlakha (Barkhey)
Darla དར་ལ་	Gengu Yagang གྱན་གུ་_ཡ་སྒང་	Gengu
Darla དར་ལ་	Gengu Yagang གྱན་གུ་_ཡ་སྒང་	Yagang
Darla དར་ལ་	Samarchen Sinchula ས་དམར་ཅན་_སིན་ཅུ་ལ་	Pagshinggang (Pakshina)
Darla དར་ལ་	Samarchen Sinchula ས་དམར་ཅན་_སིན་ཅུ་ལ་	Samarchen (Samachin)
Darla དར་ལ་	Samarchen Sinchula ས་དམར་ཅན་_སིན་ཅུ་ལ་	Sillangsa (Silley)
Darla དར་ལ་	Samarchen Sinchula ས་དམར་ཅན་_སིན་ཅུ་ལ་	Sinchula
Darla དར་ལ་	Gamanang Kalzangri དགའ་མ་ནང་_སྐལ་བཟང་རི་	Dojangchhey (Dojangchey)
Darla དར་ལ་	Gamanang Kalzangri དགའ་མ་ནང་_སྐལ་བཟང་རི་	Kimalakha
Darla དར་ལ་	Gamanang Kalzangri དགའ་མ་ནང་_སྐལ་བཟང་རི་	Gamanang
Darla དར་ལ་	Sharphug ཤར་ཕུག་	Sharphug (Sangkhu)
Dungna གདུང་ན་	Babana Papaling བ་བ་ན་_པ་པ་གླིང་	Papaling
Dungna གདུང་ན་	Babana Papaling བ་བ་ན་_པ་པ་གླིང་	Babana
Dungna གདུང་ན་	Chhulakha Mangdokha ཆུ་ལ་ཁ་_དམངས་རྡོ་ཁ་	Mangdokha
Dungna གདུང་ན་	Doongna Pagsellhakha གདུང་ན་_དཔག་སེལ་ལྷ་ཁ་	Doongma
Dungna གདུང་ན་	Doongna Pagsellhakha གདུང་ན་_དཔག་སེལ་ལྷ་ཁ་	Pangu
Dungna གདུང་ན་	Drukdingsa Khori འབྲུག་སྡིང་ས་_ཁོ་རི་	Drukdingsa
Dungna གདུང་ན་	Damchekha Uezhi དམ་ཆེཁ་_གཡུས་བཞི་	Uezhi
Geling དགེ་གླིང་	Gelingkha Tsanglina དགེ་གླིང་_གཙང་ལི་ན་	Tsanglina
Geling དགེ་གླིང་	Dagpa Sorchhen དྭགས་པ་_སོར་ཅན་	Dagpa
Geling དགེ་གླིང་	Dagpa Sorchhen དྭགས་པ་_སོར་ཅན་	Changeykha
Geling དགེ་གླིང་	Dagpa Sorchhen དྭགས་པ་_སོར་ཅན་	Omchhu
Geling དགེ་གླིང་	Geling Geygoen དགེ་གླིང་_རྒས་དགོན་	Geygoen
Geling དགེ་གླིང་	Kamji Nayekha སྐམ་སྦྱིས་_ན་ཡེ་ཁ་	Nayekha
Geling དགེ་གླིང་	Dilibkha Lamjokha འདི་ལིབ་ཁ་_ལམ་འགྱོ་ཁ་	Dilib
Getana གད་སྟག་ན་	Darga Tshebji དར་ག་_ཚེབ་སྦྱི་	Daga
Getana གད་སྟག་ན་	Darga Tshebji དར་ག་_ཚེབ་སྦྱི་	Tshebji
Getana གད་སྟག་ན་	Tashigang བཀྲིས་སྒང་	Trashigang
Getana གད་སྟག་ན་	Janamo Phootsha རྒྱ་ན་མོ་_ཕུ་ཚ་	Phootsha
Getana གད་སྟག་ན་	Bachhu Getana བ་ཆུ་_གད་སྟག་ན་	Bachhu
Getana གད་སྟག་ན་	Chiyuel Getag སྤི་ཡུལ་_གད་སྟག་	Chiyuel
Getana གད་སྟག་ན་	Chiyuel Getag སྤི་ཡུལ་_གད་སྟག་	Pangsela
Lokchina ལོག་ཅི་ན་	Chagdokha Damchekha ལྕགས་རྡོ་ཁ་_དམ་ཆེ་ཁ་	Chagdokha (Chadokha)
Lokchina ལོག་ཅི་ན་	Chagdokha Damchekha ལྕགས་རྡོ་ཁ་_དམ་ཆེ་ཁ་	Damchekha
Lokchina ལོག་ཅི་ན་	Chagdokha Damchekha ལྕགས་རྡོ་ཁ་_དམ་ཆེ་ཁ་	Lotokha
Lokchina ལོག་ཅི་ན་	Dolepchen Bjagchhu རྡོ་ལེབ་ཅན་_བྱག་ཆུ་	Bjagchhu
Lokchina ལོག་ཅི་ན་	Dolepchen Bjagchhu རྡོ་ལེབ་ཅན་_བྱག་ཆུ་	Dolepchen
Lokchina ལོག་ཅི་ན་	Aamleg Dofam ཨམ་ལེགས་_རྡོ་ཕཱམ་	Dofam
Lokchina ལོག་ཅི་ན་	Aamleg Dofam ཨམ་ལེགས་_རྡོ་ཕཱམ་	Aamleg
Lokchina ལོག་ཅི་ན་	Aamleg Dofam ཨམ་ལེགས་_རྡོ་ཕཱམ་	Pamji
Lokchina ལོག་ཅི་ན་	Aamleg Dofam ཨམ་ལེགས་_རྡོ་ཕཱམ་	Dupanang (Dubeni)
Lokchina ལོག་ཅི་ན་	Dzedokha ཛེ་རྡོ་ཁ་	Dzedokha
Lokchina ལོག་ཅི་ན་	Mongna Lhasarp མོང་ན་_ལྷ་གསརཔ་	Chimongna Ka (Chimuna A)
Lokchina ལོག་ཅི་ན་	Mongna Lhasarp མོང་ན་_ལྷ་གསརཔ་	Chimongna Kha (Chimuna B)
Metakha སྨད་བཏབ་ཁ་	Pangu སྤང་འགུ་	Pangu
Metakha སྨད་བཏབ་ཁ་	Jozhing Khamaedtab Toed ཇོ་ཞིང་ཁ་_སྨད་བཏབ་སྟོད་	Metap Goenpa Toed
Metakha སྨད་བཏབ་ཁ་	Maedtab Maed སྨད་བཏབ་སྨད་	Metap Goenpa Maed
Metakha སྨད་བཏབ་ཁ་	Uekha གཡུས་ཁ་	Uekha
Metakha སྨད་བཏབ་ཁ་	Gumina Tenchhukha མགུ་མི་ན་_བསྟན་ཆུ་ཁ་	Gumina
Phuentsholing ཕུན་ཚོགས་གླིང་	Lingdaen གླིང་ལྡན་	Bosokha
Phuentsholing ཕུན་ཚོགས་གླིང་	Lingdaen གླིང་ལྡན་	Gangteng (Serina)
Phuentsholing ཕུན་ཚོགས་གླིང་	Lingdaen གླིང་ལྡན་	Lingdaen
Phuentsholing ཕུན་ཚོགས་གླིང་	Lingdaen གླིང་ལྡན་	Tashidingkha
Phuentsholing ཕུན་ཚོགས་གླིང་	Pachhu སྤ་ཆུ་	Dajaygang
Phuentsholing ཕུན་ཚོགས་གླིང་	Pachhu སྤ་ཆུ་	Pachhuthang (Balden Dara)
Phuentsholing ཕུན་ཚོགས་གླིང་	Pachhu སྤ་ཆུ་	Pachhudrag (Pachu Dara)
Phuentsholing ཕུན་ཚོགས་གླིང་	Pachhu སྤ་ཆུ་	Pachhugang (Pachu Tar)
Phuentsholing ཕུན་ཚོགས་གླིང་	Dophugchen Wangduegatshel རྡོ་ཕུག་ཅན་_དབང་འདུས་དགའ་ཚལ་	Toribari
Phuentsholing ཕུན་ཚོགས་གླིང་	Dophugchen Wangduegatshel རྡོ་ཕུག་ཅན་_དབང་འདུས་དགའ་ཚལ་	Ahalay (Dophugchen)
Phuentsholing ཕུན་ཚོགས་གླིང་	Dophugchen Wangduegatshel རྡོ་ཕུག་ཅན་_དབང་འདུས་དགའ་ཚལ་	Wangdue Gatshel (Ramitay)
Phuentsholing ཕུན་ཚོགས་གླིང་	Deling Marpji བདེ་གླིང་_དམརཔ་སྦྱིས་	Marpji (Chilauney)
Phuentsholing ཕུན་ཚོགས་གླིང་	Deling Marpji བདེ་གླིང་_དམརཔ་སྦྱིས་	Deling (Chomchey)
Phuentsholing ཕུན་ཚོགས་གླིང་	Chonggeykha Dophulakha ཅོང་གེ་ཁ་_རྡོ་ཕུ་ལ་ཁ་	Chongeykha A
Phuentsholing ཕུན་ཚོགས་གླིང་	Chonggeykha Dophulakha ཅོང་གེ་ཁ་_རྡོ་ཕུ་ལ་ཁ་	Chonggeykha B
Phuentsholing ཕུན་ཚོགས་གླིང་	Chonggeykha Dophulakha ཅོང་གེ་ཁ་_རྡོ་ཕུ་ལ་ཁ་	Dophulakha
Phuentsholing ཕུན་ཚོགས་གླིང་	Chonggeykha Dophulakha ཅོང་གེ་ཁ་_རྡོ་ཕུ་ལ་ཁ་	Kungkha
Sampheling བསམ་འཕེལ་གླིང་	Pekarling Rigzingling པད་དཀར་གླིང་_རིག་འཟིན་གླིང་	Rigzinling (Behitar)
Sampheling བསམ་འཕེལ་གླིང་	Pekarling Rigzingling པད་དཀར་གླིང་_རིག་འཟིན་གླིང་	Pekarling (Pekasey)
Sampheling བསམ་འཕེལ་གླིང་	Sengyagang Tshochhoongna སེ་དྒེ་སྒང་_མཚོ་ཆུང་ན་	Tshachhungnal (Ahalay)
Sampheling བསམ་འཕེལ་གླིང་	Sengyagang Tshochhoongna སེ་དྒེ་སྒང་_མཚོ་ཆུང་ན་	Khatob (Burkey)
Sampheling བསམ་འཕེལ་གླིང་	Sengyagang Tshochhoongna སེ་དྒེ་སྒང་_མཚོ་ཆུང་ན་	Dungkarling (Ghumauney)
Sampheling བསམ་འཕེལ་གླིང་	Sengyagang Tshochhoongna སེ་དྒེ་སྒང་_མཚོ་ཆུང་ན་	Phurpaling; Gurung Dara)
Sampheling བསམ་འཕེལ་གླིང་	Sengyagang Tshochhoongna སེ་དྒེ་སྒང་_མཚོ་ཆུང་ན་	Karmaling (Malbasay)
Sampheling བསམ་འཕེལ་གླིང་	Sengyagang Tshochhoongna སེ་དྒེ་སྒང་_མཚོ་ཆུང་ན་	Sengyegang(Singi)
Sampheling བསམ་འཕེལ་གླིང་	Khenpaithang Sonamthang མཁན་པའི་ཐང་_བསོད་ནམས་ཐང་	Thongling (Daragoan)
Sampheling བསམ་འཕེལ་གླིང་	Khenpaithang Sonamthang མཁན་པའི་ཐང་_བསོད་ནམས་ཐང་	Khepaithang (Khaibatar)
Sampheling བསམ་འཕེལ་གླིང་	Khenpaithang Sonamthang མཁན་པའི་ཐང་_བསོད་ནམས་ཐང་	Sonamtang (Kothiline)
Sampheling བསམ་འཕེལ་གླིང་	Gongboogang Pangna སྒོང་བུ་སྒང་_སྤང་ན་	Pangna A
Sampheling བསམ་འཕེལ་གླིང་	Gongboogang Pangna སྒོང་བུ་སྒང་_སྤང་ན་	Pangna B
Sampheling བསམ་འཕེལ་གླིང་	Gongboogang Pangna སྒོང་བུ་སྒང་_སྤང་ན་	Pangna C
Sampheling བསམ་འཕེལ་གླིང་	Gongboogang Pangna སྒོང་བུ་སྒང་_སྤང་ན་	Bamenmo (Ragaythung)
Sampheling བསམ་འཕེལ་གླིང་	Pedtshelnang པད་ཚལ་ནང་	Doruphug (Dhungayna)
Sampheling བསམ་འཕེལ་གླིང་	Pedtshelnang པད་ཚལ་ནང་	Pedtshelnang (Pakchina)

=== Dagana District ===
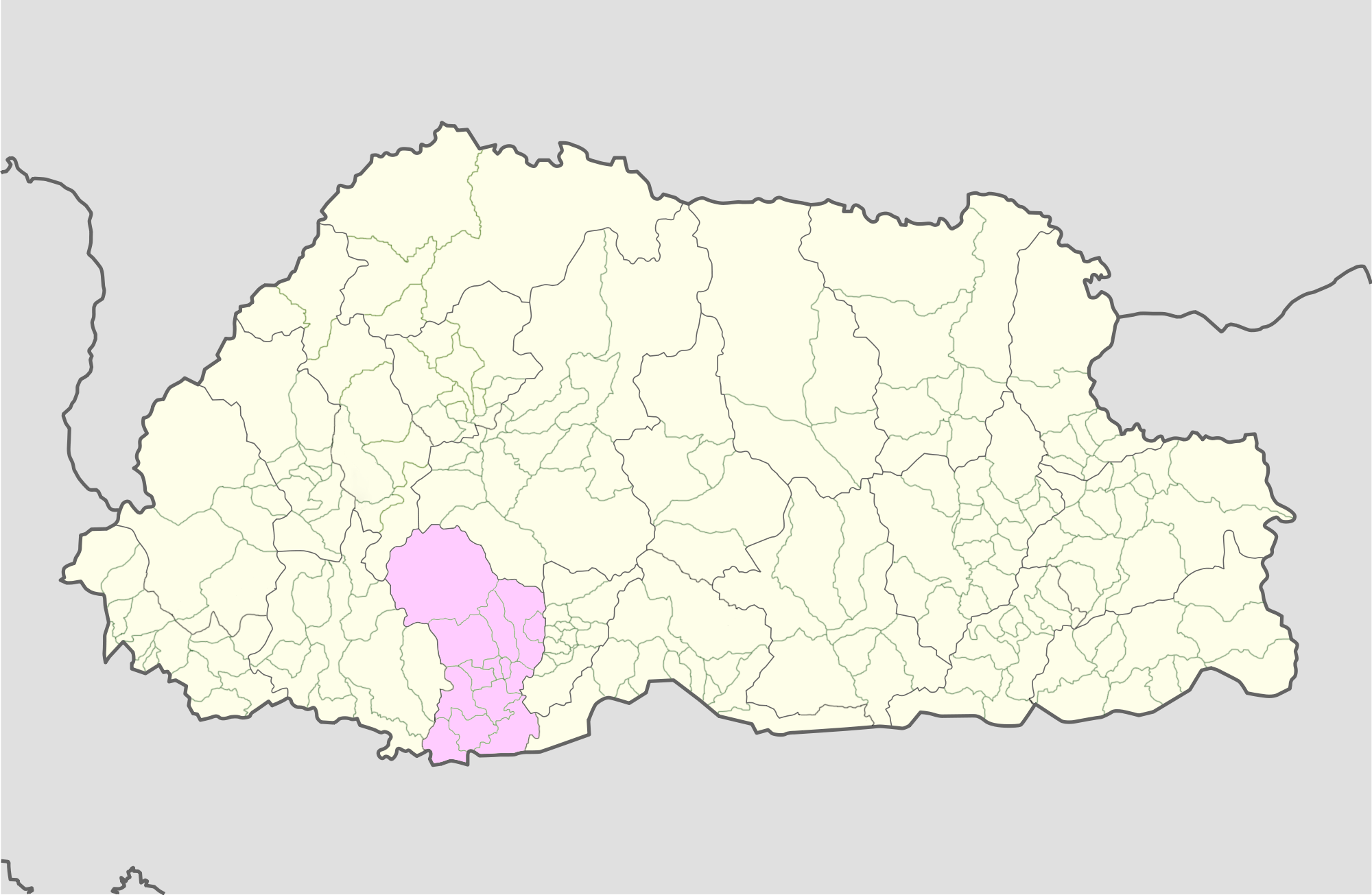
Dagana District

Gewog	Chiwog	Village
Dorona རྡོ་རོ་ན་	Maamedthang དམའ་མེད་ཐང་	Chukam
Dorona རྡོ་རོ་ན་	Maamedthang དམའ་མེད་ཐང་	Lalidhapper
Dorona རྡོ་རོ་ན་	Maamedthang དམའ་མེད་ཐང་	Maamedthang
Dorona རྡོ་རོ་ན་	Nyimtola ཉིམ་ཏོ་ལ་	Banglachu
Dorona རྡོ་རོ་ན་	Nyimtola ཉིམ་ཏོ་ལ་	Nyimtola
Dorona རྡོ་རོ་ན་	Dorona Chhongwa རྡོ་རོ་ན་ཆུང་བ་	Dorona Chhoongwa (Sanu Dorona)
Dorona རྡོ་རོ་ན་	Dorona Chhewa རྡོ་རོ་ན་ཆེ་བ་	Dorona Chhewa (Thulo Dorona)
Dorona རྡོ་རོ་ན་	Tshalamji ཚྭ་ལམ་སྦྱིས་	Dolepchen
Dorona རྡོ་རོ་ན་	Tshalamji ཚྭ་ལམ་སྦྱིས་	Nedachu
Dorona རྡོ་རོ་ན་	Tshalamji ཚྭ་ལམ་སྦྱིས་	Sushithang
Drujegang འབྲུག་རྗེས་སྒང་	Pangna Patala སྤང་ན་_པ་ཏ་ལ་	Upper Pangna
Drujegang འབྲུག་རྗེས་སྒང་	Thangna ཐང་ན་	Tangna
Drujegang འབྲུག་རྗེས་སྒང་	Budepang Pangna སྦུ་བདེ་སྤང་_སྤང་ན་	Lower Pangna
Drujegang འབྲུག་རྗེས་སྒང་	Ambithang Pangserpo ཨམ་བི་ཐང་_སྤང་སེར་པོ་	Lower Pangserbo
Drujegang འབྲུག་རྗེས་སྒང་	Pangserpo སྤང་སེར་པོ་	Upper Pangserbo
Gesarling གེ་སར་གླིང་	Tajoog རྟ་རྒྱུགས་	Tajoog
Gesarling གེ་སར་གླིང་	Samtengang བསམ་རྟན་སྒང་	Samtengang
Gesarling གེ་སར་གླིང་	Gesarling གེ་སར་གླིང་	Gangjab
Gesarling གེ་སར་གླིང་	Gesarling གེ་སར་གླིང་	Gesarling
Gesarling གེ་སར་གླིང་	Phuensoomgang སྤུན་སུམ་སྒང་	Phuensoomgang
Gesarling གེ་སར་གླིང་	Tashithang བཀྲིས་ཐང་	Tashithang
Goshi སྒོ་བཞི་	Baleggang སྦ་ལེགས་སྒང་	Baleggang
Goshi སྒོ་བཞི་	Dogaag རྡོ་འགག་	Dogaag
Goshi སྒོ་བཞི་	Gozhi སྒོ་བཞི་	Gozhi
Goshi སྒོ་བཞི་	Gozhi Maed སྒོ་བཞི་སྨད་	Gozhi Maed
Goshi སྒོ་བཞི་	Gozhi Toed སྒོ་བཞི་སྟོད་	Gozhi Toed
Kana བཀར་ན་	Lhaling ལྷ་གླིང་	Kanakha
Kana བཀར་ན་	Lhaling ལྷ་གླིང་	Lhaling
Kana བཀར་ན་	Lhaling ལྷ་གླིང་	Nyindukha
Kana བཀར་ན་	Lhaling ལྷ་གླིང་	Tanabji
Kana བཀར་ན་	Purgzhi སྤང་གཞི་	Pungzhi
Kana བཀར་ན་	Dalithang Gangjab Khagochen ད་ལི་ཐང་_སྒང་རྒྱབ་_ཁ་སྒོ་ཅན་	Dalithang
Kana བཀར་ན་	Dalithang Gangjab Khagochen ད་ལི་ཐང་_སྒང་རྒྱབ་_ཁ་སྒོ་ཅན་	Gangjab
Kana བཀར་ན་	Dalithang Gangjab Khagochen ད་ལི་ཐང་_སྒང་རྒྱབ་_ཁ་སྒོ་ཅན་	Khagochen
Kana བཀར་ན་	Bartsha Namgyalgang བར་ཚྭ_རྣམ་རྒྱལ་སྒང་	Aetosi
Kana བཀར་ན་	Bartsha Namgyalgang བར་ཚྭ_རྣམ་རྒྱལ་སྒང་	Bartsha
Kana བཀར་ན་	Bartsha Namgyalgang བར་ཚྭ_རྣམ་རྒྱལ་སྒང་	Buchunang
Kana བཀར་ན་	Bartsha Namgyalgang བར་ཚྭ_རྣམ་རྒྱལ་སྒང་	Namgaylang
Kana བཀར་ན་	Jurugang རྒྱུ་རུ་སྒང་	Jurugang
Kana བཀར་ན་	Jurugang རྒྱུ་རུ་སྒང་	Kazhithang
Kana བཀར་ན་	Jurugang རྒྱུ་རུ་སྒང་	Lungtengang
Karmaling ཀརྨ་གླིང་	Karmaling ཀརྨ་གླིང་	Karmaling (Kerabari)
Karmaling ཀརྨ་གླིང་	Omchhu ཨོམ་ཆུ་	Omchhu (Homa)
Karmaling ཀརྨ་གླིང་	Labtsakha ལབ་རྩ་ཁ་	Labtsakha (Deorali)
Karmaling ཀརྨ་གླིང་	Senchumthang སྲན་ཅུམ་ཐང་	Senchumthang (Dalbari)
Karmaling ཀརྨ་གླིང་	Senchumthang སྲན་ཅུམ་ཐང་	Ganglingna (Labrang)
Karmaling ཀརྨ་གླིང་	Jemathang བྱེ་མ་ཐང་	Jemthang (Balabas)
Khebisa ཁེ་སྦིས་ས་	Pogtog སྤོག་ཏོག་	Pogtog
Khebisa ཁེ་སྦིས་ས་	Pogtog སྤོག་ཏོག་	Gumla
Khebisa ཁེ་སྦིས་ས་	Pagser དཔག་གསེར་	Pasger (Paksey)
Khebisa ཁེ་སྦིས་ས་	Akhochen ཨ་ཁོ་ཅན་	Akhochen
Khebisa ཁེ་སྦིས་ས་	Thomgang མཐོངམ་སྒང་	Thomgang
Khebisa ཁེ་སྦིས་ས་	Gibsa གྱིབ་ས་	Gibsa
Lagyab ལ་རྒྱབ་	Baloong བ་ལུང་	Baloong
Lagyab ལ་རྒྱབ་	Thasa ཐ་ས་	Thasa
Lagyab ལ་རྒྱབ་	Kompa སྐོན་པ་	Kompa
Lagyab ལ་རྒྱབ་	Barna བར་ན་	Barna
Lagyab ལ་རྒྱབ་	Sidpa སྲིད་པ་	Sidpa
Lhamoi Zingkha ལྷ་མོའི་རྫིང་ཁ་	Tshaemzhigosa མཚམས་བཞི་བགོ་ས་	Majathang (Lamchey)
Lhamoi Zingkha ལྷ་མོའི་རྫིང་ཁ་	Tshaemzhigosa མཚམས་བཞི་བགོ་ས་	Tshaemjeena
Lhamoi Zingkha ལྷ་མོའི་རྫིང་ཁ་	Tshaemzhigosa མཚམས་བཞི་བགོ་ས་	Tshaemzhi Gosa (Tshaemjeena/Devitar)
Lhamoi Zingkha ལྷ་མོའི་རྫིང་ཁ་	Chongsamling སྐྱོངས་བསམ་གླིང་	Chongsamling (Sibsooni)
Lhamoi Zingkha ལྷ་མོའི་རྫིང་ཁ་	Lhamoidzingkha ལྷ་མོའི་རྫིང་ཁ་	Lhamoidzingkha (Kalikhola)
Lhamoi Zingkha ལྷ་མོའི་རྫིང་ཁ་	Loongsilsa རླུང་བསིལ་ས་	Loongsilsa (Daragaon)
Lhamoi Zingkha ལྷ་མོའི་རྫིང་ཁ་	Kuendrelthang ཀུན་འབྲལ་ཐང་	Kuendrelthang (Majigaon)
Nichula ནི་ཅུ་ལ་	Dramzekesa བྲམ་ཟེ་སྐྱེས་ས་	Dramze Kesa (Katarey)
Nichula ནི་ཅུ་ལ་	Yarpheling ཡར་འཕེལ་གླིང་	Tsheluthang (Suntoley)
Nichula ནི་ཅུ་ལ་	Yarpheling ཡར་འཕེལ་གླིང་	Yarpheling (Solmoley)
Nichula ནི་ཅུ་ལ་	Yarpheling ཡར་འཕེལ་གླིང་	Nyeltshosa (Basiney)
Nichula ནི་ཅུ་ལ་	Yarpheling ཡར་འཕེལ་གླིང་	Lakpaling (Manglabarey)
Nichula ནི་ཅུ་ལ་	Yarpheling ཡར་འཕེལ་གླིང་	Nichula
Nichula ནི་ཅུ་ལ་	Damchhunang དམ་ཆུ་ནང་	Damchhunang (Allay)
Nichula ནི་ཅུ་ལ་	Dangreyboog དྭངས་རས་སྦུག་	Dangreyboog (Bichgoan)
Nichula ནི་ཅུ་ལ་	Gangtogkha སྒང་ཏོག་ཁ་	Omchhugang (Apgachi)
Nichula ནི་ཅུ་ལ་	Gangtogkha སྒང་ཏོག་ཁ་	Gangtokha (Daragoan)
Trashiding བཀྲིས་ལྡིང་	Shamdolay གཤམ་དོ་ལེ་	Shamdolay
Trashiding བཀྲིས་ལྡིང་	Tashiding བཀྲིས་ལྡིང་	Tashiding
Trashiding བཀྲིས་ལྡིང་	Namchagla གནམ་ལྕགས་ལ་	Namchagla
Trashiding བཀྲིས་ལྡིང་	Norbuling ནོར་བུ་གླིང་	Norbuling (Lodoma)
Trashiding བཀྲིས་ལྡིང་	Norbuling ནོར་བུ་གླིང་	Langchhenthang (Hathikhara)
Trashiding བཀྲིས་ལྡིང་	Gangyab སྒང་རྒྱབ་	Gangyab (Gopeni)
Tsangkha གཙང་ཁ་	Gelegchhu དགེ་ལེགས་ཆུ་	Gelegchhu
Tsangkha གཙང་ཁ་	Gelegchhu དགེ་ལེགས་ཆུ་	Salambi
Tsangkha གཙང་ཁ་	Tsangkha གཙང་ཁ་	Gakidthang
Tsangkha གཙང་ཁ་	Tsangkha གཙང་ཁ་	Tsangkha
Tsangkha གཙང་ཁ་	Zinchila ཟིན་ཅི་ལ་	Rongchhu (Bandarchu)
Tsangkha གཙང་ཁ་	Zinchila ཟིན་ཅི་ལ་	Zinchila
Tsangkha གཙང་ཁ་	Goongpa Soomchu གུང་པ་སུམ་ཅུ་	Satshamchhu (Budheychu)
Tsangkha གཙང་ཁ་	Goongpa Soomchu གུང་པ་སུམ་ཅུ་	Goongpa Soomchu (Tisgharay)
Tsangkha གཙང་ཁ་	Pateykha པ་ཏེ་ཁ་	Pateykha
Tsangkha གཙང་ཁ་	Pateykha པ་ཏེ་ཁ་	Babythang
Tsendagang བཙན་མདའ་སྒང་	Tsendagang བཙན་མདའ་སྒང་	Tsendagang
Tsendagang བཙན་མདའ་སྒང་	Tsendagang བཙན་མདའ་སྒང་	Tsendagang (Suntoley)
Tsendagang བཙན་མདའ་སྒང་	Gangzur Maed སྒང་ཟུར་སྟོད་	Gangzur
Tsendagang བཙན་མདའ་སྒང་	Gangzur Maed སྒང་ཟུར་སྟོད་	Gangzur Maed (Salaree)
Tsendagang བཙན་མདའ་སྒང་	Gangzur Maed སྒང་ཟུར་སྟོད་	Gangzur (Shamdolay)
Tsendagang བཙན་མདའ་སྒང་	Gangzur Toed སྒང་ཟུར་སྨད་	Gangzur (Panakhola)
Tsendagang བཙན་མདའ་སྒང་	Gangzur Toed སྒང་ཟུར་སྨད་	Gangzur Toed (Pasebung)
Tsendagang བཙན་མདའ་སྒང་	Norbuzingkha ནོར་བུ་ཞིང་ཁ་	Dharay
Tsendagang བཙན་མདའ་སྒང་	Norbuzingkha ནོར་བུ་ཞིང་ཁ་	Yuebug (Majuwa)
Tsendagang བཙན་མདའ་སྒང་	Norbuzingkha ནོར་བུ་ཞིང་ཁ་	Norbuzhingkha
Tsendagang བཙན་མདའ་སྒང་	Norbuzingkha ནོར་བུ་ཞིང་ཁ་	Norbuzhingkha (Panakhola)
Tsendagang བཙན་མདའ་སྒང་	Samarchu ས་མར་ཆུ་	Samarchu (Samakhola)
Tseza བརྩེ་ཟ་	Pelling དཔལ་གླིང་	Pelling
Tseza བརྩེ་ཟ་	Pelling དཔལ་གླིང་	Tongshong (Tongzho)
Tseza བརྩེ་ཟ་	Tashigang བཀྲིས་སྒང་	Jangsagang
Tseza བརྩེ་ཟ་	Tashigang བཀྲིས་སྒང་	Tashigang
Tseza བརྩེ་ཟ་	Samaed ས་སྨད་	Samaed
Tseza བརྩེ་ཟ་	Karlingzingkha དཀར་གླིང་རྗིང་ཁ་	Karlingzingkha
Tseza བརྩེ་ཟ་	Tsangleykha གཙང་ལེགས་ཁ་	Tsangleykha
Tseza བརྩེ་ཟ་	Tsangleykha གཙང་ལེགས་ཁ་	Zamtog

=== Gasa District ===
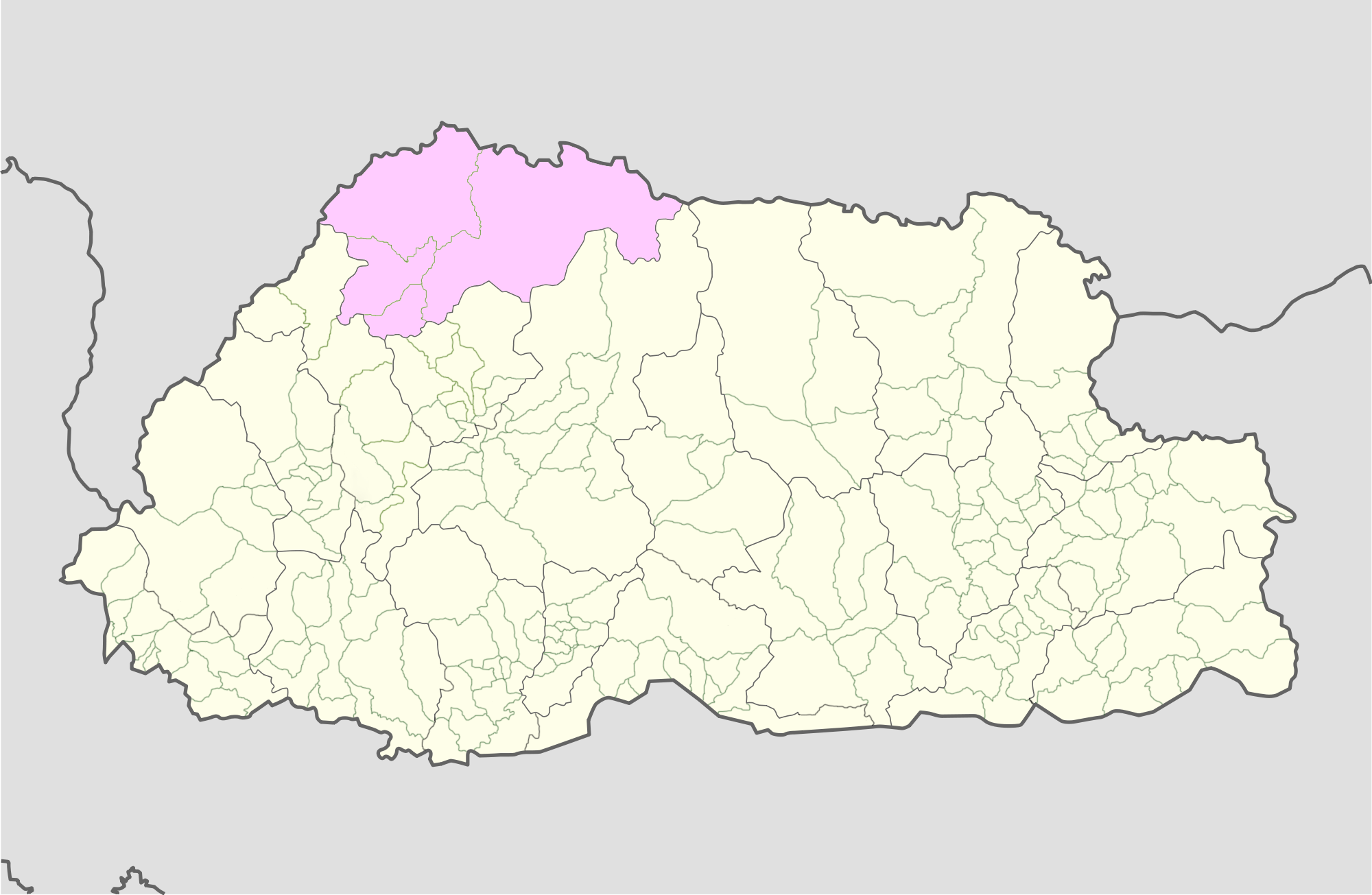
Gasa District

Gewog	Chiwog	Village
Khamaed ཁ་སྨད་	Gayza Zomina དགེ་ཟ་_བཟོ་མི་ན་	Gayza
Khamaed ཁ་སྨད་	Gayza Zomina དགེ་ཟ་_བཟོ་མི་ན་	Zomina
Khamaed ཁ་སྨད་	Jabisa རྒྱ་སྦིས་ས་	Tomu
Khamaed ཁ་སྨད་	Jabisa རྒྱ་སྦིས་ས་	Jabisa
Khamaed ཁ་སྨད་	Jabisa རྒྱ་སྦིས་ས་	Chubdey
Khamaed ཁ་སྨད་	Jabisa རྒྱ་སྦིས་ས་	Bara
Khamaed ཁ་སྨད་	Jabisa རྒྱ་སྦིས་ས་	Chruawog
Khamaed ཁ་སྨད་	Damji དྭངསམ་སྦྱིས་	Damjee
Khamaed ཁ་སྨད་	Damji དྭངསམ་སྦྱིས་	Tsanakha
Khamaed ཁ་སྨད་	Damji དྭངསམ་སྦྱིས་	Potogang
Khamaed ཁ་སྨད་	Damji དྭངསམ་སྦྱིས་	Chasungsa
Khamaed ཁ་སྨད་	Damji དྭངསམ་སྦྱིས་	Churaphakha
Khamaed ཁ་སྨད་	Damji དྭངསམ་སྦྱིས་	Jizhi
Khamaed ཁ་སྨད་	Damji དྭངསམ་སྦྱིས་	Selikha
Khamaed ཁ་སྨད་	Barsha Panikong བར་ཤ་_སྤ་ནི་སྐོང་	Barsha
Khamaed ཁ་སྨད་	Barsha Panikong བར་ཤ་_སྤ་ནི་སྐོང་	Yeomena
Khamaed ཁ་སྨད་	Barsha Panikong བར་ཤ་_སྤ་ནི་སྐོང་	Bayzhina
Khamaed ཁ་སྨད་	Barsha Panikong བར་ཤ་_སྤ་ནི་སྐོང་	Chalakha
Khamaed ཁ་སྨད་	Barsha Panikong བར་ཤ་_སྤ་ནི་སྐོང་	Kabina
Khamaed ཁ་སྨད་	Barsha Panikong བར་ཤ་_སྤ་ནི་སྐོང་	Zhazhukha
Khamaed ཁ་སྨད་	Barsha Panikong བར་ཤ་_སྤ་ནི་སྐོང་	Namphakha
Khamaed ཁ་སྨད་	Barsha Panikong བར་ཤ་_སྤ་ནི་སྐོང་	Jazhidingkha
Khamaed ཁ་སྨད་	Barsha Panikong བར་ཤ་_སྤ་ནི་སྐོང་	Yeodo
Khamaed ཁ་སྨད་	Khailog Tashithang ཁའི་ལོག་_ལྟར་ཤིང་ཐང་	Khailog
Khamaed ཁ་སྨད་	Khailog Tashithang ཁའི་ལོག་_ལྟར་ཤིང་ཐང་	Tashithang
Khatoed ཁ་སྟོད་	Chhogley Phulakha ཕྱོགས་ལས་_ཕུ་ལ་ཁ་	Chhogley
Khatoed ཁ་སྟོད་	Chhogley Phulakha ཕྱོགས་ལས་_ཕུ་ལ་ཁ་	Gathana
Khatoed ཁ་སྟོད་	Chhogley Phulakha ཕྱོགས་ལས་_ཕུ་ལ་ཁ་	Khailog
Khatoed ཁ་སྟོད་	Chhogley Phulakha ཕྱོགས་ལས་_ཕུ་ལ་ཁ་	Phulakha
Khatoed ཁ་སྟོད་	Mani མ་ནི་	Mani
Khatoed ཁ་སྟོད་	Mani མ་ནི་	Dongyebi
Khatoed ཁ་སྟོད་	Mani མ་ནི་	Tabchen
Khatoed ཁ་སྟོད་	Mani མ་ནི་	Yemena
Khatoed ཁ་སྟོད་	Baychhu Tshedpgang སྦས་ཆུ_ཚདཔ་སྒང་	Baychhu
Khatoed ཁ་སྟོད་	Baychhu Tshedpgang སྦས་ཆུ_ཚདཔ་སྒང་	Tsebgang
Khatoed ཁ་སྟོད་	Tsheringkha ཚེ་རིང་ཁ་	Tsheringkha
Khatoed ཁ་སྟོད་	Tsheringkha ཚེ་རིང་ཁ་	Datakha
Khatoed ཁ་སྟོད་	Tsheringkha ཚེ་རིང་ཁ་	Zamna
Khatoed ཁ་སྟོད་	Tsheringkha ཚེ་རིང་ཁ་	Zanang
Khatoed ཁ་སྟོད་	Tsheringkha ཚེ་རིང་ཁ་	Thangkha
Khatoed ཁ་སྟོད་	Tsheringkha ཚེ་རིང་ཁ་	Lungchukha
Khatoed ཁ་སྟོད་	Tsheringkha ཚེ་རིང་ཁ་	Neukha
Khatoed ཁ་སྟོད་	Rimi རི་མི་	Womchugang
Khatoed ཁ་སྟོད་	Rimi རི་མི་	Dochong
Khatoed ཁ་སྟོད་	Rimi རི་མི་	Belpakha
Khatoed ཁ་སྟོད་	Rimi རི་མི་	Tsangkha
Khatoed ཁ་སྟོད་	Rimi རི་མི་	Amochhu
Khatoed ཁ་སྟོད་	Rimi རི་མི་	Nurbi
Laya ལ་ཡ་	Gayza Lunggo རྒྱལ་ཟ་_ལུང་སྒོ་	Gayza
Laya ལ་ཡ་	Gayza Lunggo རྒྱལ་ཟ་_ལུང་སྒོ་	Lungo
Laya ལ་ཡ་	Chongra Loobcha སྐྱོང་ར་_ལུབ་ལྕགས་	Chongra
Laya ལ་ཡ་	Chongra Loobcha སྐྱོང་ར་_ལུབ་ལྕགས་	Lubcha
Laya ལ་ཡ་	Neylug གནས་ལུགས་	Neylug
Laya ལ་ཡ་	Pazhi པ་གཞི་	Pazhi
Laya ལ་ཡ་	Toedkor སྟོད་སྐོར་	Toedkor
Lunana ལུང་ནག་ན་	Raminang Uesana ར་མི་ནང་_དབུས་ས་ནང་	Raminang
Lunana ལུང་ནག་ན་	Raminang Uesana ར་མི་ནང་_དབུས་ས་ནང་	Uesana
Lunana ལུང་ནག་ན་	Shang Threlga Wachey གཤང་_འཕྲལ་ག་_ཝ་བཅས་	Drangsho
Lunana ལུང་ནག་ན་	Shang Threlga Wachey གཤང་_འཕྲལ་ག་_ཝ་བཅས་	Wachey
Lunana ལུང་ནག་ན་	Shang Threlga Wachey གཤང་_འཕྲལ་ག་_ཝ་བཅས་	Relo
Lunana ལུང་ནག་ན་	Shang Threlga Wachey གཤང་_འཕྲལ་ག་_ཝ་བཅས་	Shangsa
Lunana ལུང་ནག་ན་	Shang Threlga Wachey གཤང་_འཕྲལ་ག་_ཝ་བཅས་	Tagshor
Lunana ལུང་ནག་ན་	Shang Threlga Wachey གཤང་_འཕྲལ་ག་_ཝ་བཅས་	Threlga
Lunana ལུང་ནག་ན་	Lhedi ལྷད་དི་	Lhedi
Lunana ལུང་ནག་ན་	Tshozhong མཚོ་གཞོང་	Tshozhi
Lunana ལུང་ནག་ན་	Thangza Toenchoe ཐངས་ཟ་_བསྟན་བཅོས་	Dotag
Lunana ལུང་ནག་ན་	Thangza Toenchoe ཐངས་ཟ་_བསྟན་བཅོས་	Thangza
Lunana ལུང་ནག་ན་	Thangza Toenchoe ཐངས་ཟ་_བསྟན་བཅོས་	Toenchoe

=== Haa District ===
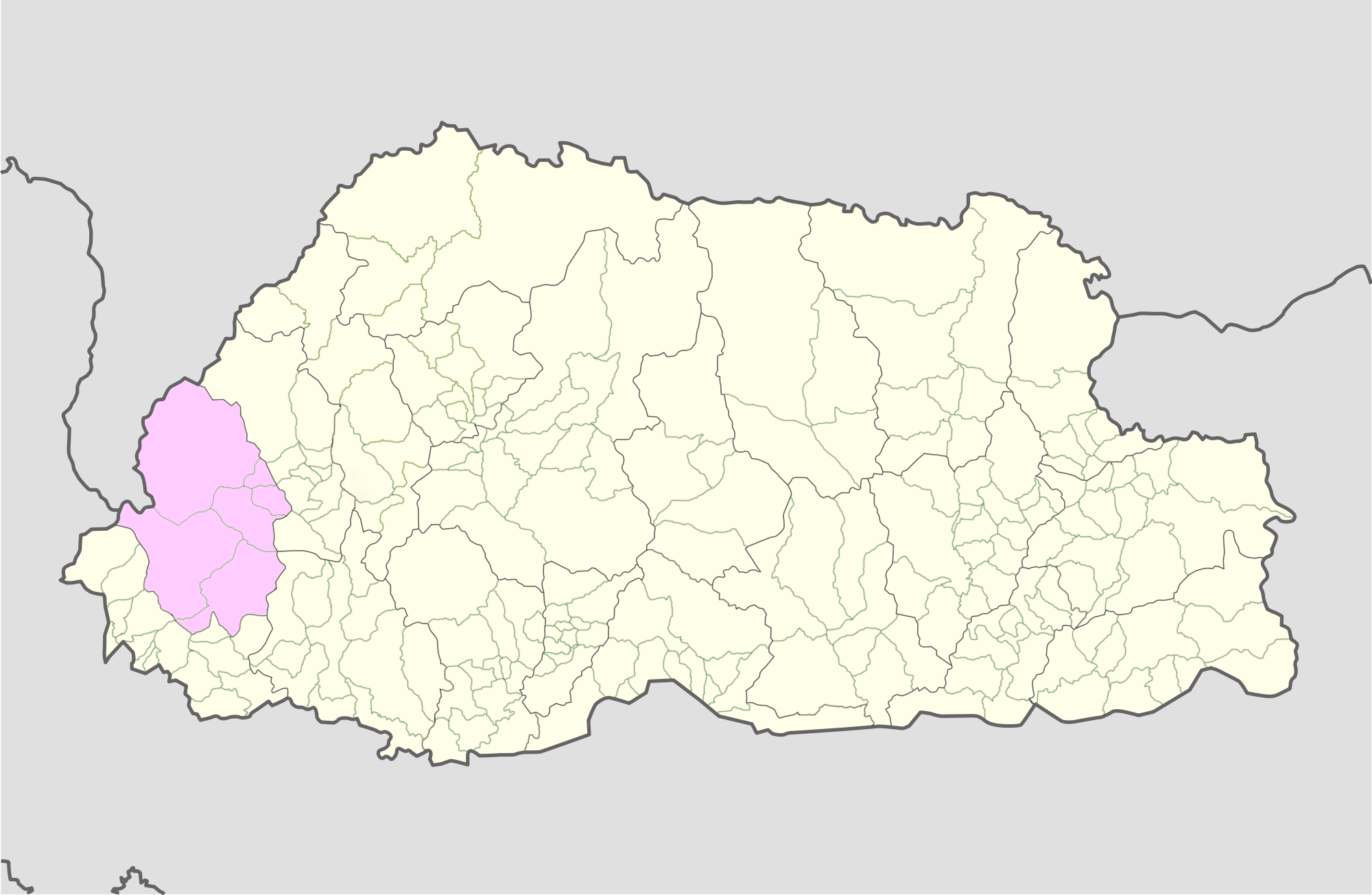
Haa District

Gewog	Chiwog	Village
Bji སྦྱིས་	Choompa Jamgoen ཅུམ་པ་_བྱམས་དགོན་	Choomgpa
Bji སྦྱིས་	Choompa Jamgoen ཅུམ་པ་_བྱམས་དགོན་	Jamgoen
Bji སྦྱིས་	Choompa Jamgoen ཅུམ་པ་_བྱམས་དགོན་	Yetshephu
Bji སྦྱིས་	Gyensa Tokey རྒྱན་ས་_ལྟོ་ཀེ་	Gyensa
Bji སྦྱིས་	Gyensa Tokey རྒྱན་ས་_ལྟོ་ཀེ་	Tokey
Bji སྦྱིས་	Chenpa Geychhukha ཅེན་པ་_དགེ་ཆུ་ཁ་	Chenpa
Bji སྦྱིས་	Chenpa Geychhukha ཅེན་པ་_དགེ་ཆུ་ཁ་	Geychhukha
Bji སྦྱིས་	Chenpa Geychhukha ཅེན་པ་_དགེ་ཆུ་ཁ་	Machina
Bji སྦྱིས་	Chenpa Geychhukha ཅེན་པ་_དགེ་ཆུ་ཁ་	Takchugoenpa
Bji སྦྱིས་	Tsenka Taloong བཙན་ཀ་_རྟ་ལུང་	Tsenka
Bji སྦྱིས་	Tsenka Taloong བཙན་ཀ་_རྟ་ལུང་	Tsenkagoenpa
Bji སྦྱིས་	Tsenka Taloong བཙན་ཀ་_རྟ་ལུང་	Chubarna
Bji སྦྱིས་	Tsenka Taloong བཙན་ཀ་_རྟ་ལུང་	Dongsana/Taloong
Bji སྦྱིས་	Tsenka Taloong བཙན་ཀ་_རྟ་ལུང་	Gungkha
Bji སྦྱིས་	Tsenka Taloong བཙན་ཀ་_རྟ་ལུང་	Longlong
Bji སྦྱིས་	Tsenka Taloong བཙན་ཀ་_རྟ་ལུང་	Makana
Bji སྦྱིས་	Tsenka Taloong བཙན་ཀ་_རྟ་ལུང་	Pangphu
Bji སྦྱིས་	Tsenka Taloong བཙན་ཀ་_རྟ་ལུང་	Wooka
Bji སྦྱིས་	Tsenka Taloong བཙན་ཀ་_རྟ་ལུང་	Yulang
Bji སྦྱིས་	Yangthang ཡངས་ཐང་	Yangoen
Bji སྦྱིས་	Yangthang ཡངས་ཐང་	Yangthang
Gakiling དགའ་སྐྱིད་གླིང་	Dorithasa Kowkha Yangtse རྡོ་རི་མཐའ་ས་_ཀོཝ་ཁ་_ཡང་རྩེ་	Dorithasa
Gakiling དགའ་སྐྱིད་གླིང་	Dorithasa Kowkha Yangtse རྡོ་རི་མཐའ་ས་_ཀོཝ་ཁ་_ཡང་རྩེ་	Yangtse
Gakiling དགའ་སྐྱིད་གླིང་	Dorithasa Kowkha Yangtse རྡོ་རི་མཐའ་ས་_ཀོཝ་ཁ་_ཡང་རྩེ་	Kowkha
Gakiling དགའ་སྐྱིད་གླིང་	Rangtse Tanga Yokha རང་རྩེ་_རྟ་ང་_ཡོ་ཁ་	Ta-nga/Chigo
Gakiling དགའ་སྐྱིད་གླིང་	Rangtse Tanga Yokha རང་རྩེ་_རྟ་ང་_ཡོ་ཁ་	Rangtse
Gakiling དགའ་སྐྱིད་གླིང་	Rangtse Tanga Yokha རང་རྩེ་_རྟ་ང་_ཡོ་ཁ་	Yokha
Gakiling དགའ་སྐྱིད་གླིང་	Saidzong Thangdokha སའི་རྫོང་_ཐང་རྡོ་ཁ་	Thangdokha
Gakiling དགའ་སྐྱིད་གླིང་	Saidzong Thangdokha སའི་རྫོང་_ཐང་རྡོ་ཁ་	Saidzong
Gakiling དགའ་སྐྱིད་གླིང་	Saidzong Thangdokha སའི་རྫོང་_ཐང་རྡོ་ཁ་	Gangrinmo
Gakiling དགའ་སྐྱིད་གླིང་	Phootsena Ngatse ཕུ་རྩེ་ན་_ང་རྩེ་	Ngatse
Gakiling དགའ་སྐྱིད་གླིང་	Phootsena Ngatse ཕུ་རྩེ་ན་_ང་རྩེ་	Phootsena
Gakiling དགའ་སྐྱིད་གླིང་	Fentena Sertena ཕན་ཏེ་ན་_སེར་ཏེ་ན་	Fetena
Gakiling དགའ་སྐྱིད་གླིང་	Fentena Sertena ཕན་ཏེ་ན་_སེར་ཏེ་ན་	Sertena
Katsho སྐར་ཚོགས་	Bali Mombitshokha བ་ལི་_མོམ་སྦི་མཚོ་ཁ་	Bali
Katsho སྐར་ཚོགས་	Bali Mombitshokha བ་ལི་_མོམ་སྦི་མཚོ་ཁ་	Mombitshokha
Katsho སྐར་ཚོགས་	Kargoen Hatam སྐར་དགོན_འ་ཏམ་	Kargoen
Katsho སྐར་ཚོགས་	Kargoen Hatam སྐར་དགོན_འ་ཏམ་	Hatam
Katsho སྐར་ཚོགས་	Dragding Karjena བྲག་སྡིང་_དཀར་རྒྱན་ན་	Dragding
Katsho སྐར་ཚོགས་	Dragding Karjena བྲག་སྡིང་_དཀར་རྒྱན་ན་	Karjena
Katsho སྐར་ཚོགས་	Dragding Karjena བྲག་སྡིང་_དཀར་རྒྱན་ན་	Gargkha
Katsho སྐར་ཚོགས་	Dragding Karjena བྲག་སྡིང་_དཀར་རྒྱན་ན་	Naktshang
Katsho སྐར་ཚོགས་	Dragding Karjena བྲག་སྡིང་_དཀར་རྒྱན་ན་	Namdhu
Katsho སྐར་ཚོགས་	Ingo Pharikha ཨིན་སགོ་_ཕ་རི་ཁ་	Ingo
Katsho སྐར་ཚོགས་	Ingo Pharikha ཨིན་སགོ་_ཕ་རི་ཁ་	Pharikha
Katsho སྐར་ཚོགས་	Wangtsa ཝང་རྩ་	Wangtsa
Samar ས་དམར་	Dorikha Langjogang རྡོ་རི་ཁ་_གླང་འབྱོག་སྒང་	Dorikha
Samar ས་དམར་	Dorikha Langjogang རྡོ་རི་ཁ་_གླང་འབྱོག་སྒང་	Kouna
Samar ས་དམར་	Dorikha Langjogang རྡོ་རི་ཁ་_གླང་འབྱོག་སྒང་	Langjogang
Samar ས་དམར་	Dorikha Langjogang རྡོ་རི་ཁ་_གླང་འབྱོག་སྒང་	Phendona
Samar ས་དམར་	Langpa Norbugang གླང་པ་_ནོར་བུ་སྒང་	Barakha
Samar ས་དམར་	Langpa Norbugang གླང་པ་_ནོར་བུ་སྒང་	Barasham
Samar ས་དམར་	Langpa Norbugang གླང་པ་_ནོར་བུ་སྒང་	Chumeyding
Samar ས་དམར་	Langpa Norbugang གླང་པ་_ནོར་བུ་སྒང་	Langpa
Samar ས་དམར་	Langpa Norbugang གླང་པ་_ནོར་བུ་སྒང་	Lhakhangchen
Samar ས་དམར་	Langpa Norbugang གླང་པ་_ནོར་བུ་སྒང་	Norbugang
Samar ས་དམར་	Balamnang བ་ལམ་ནང་	Balamnang
Samar ས་དམར་	Jenkanang Pudunang རྒྱན་ག་ནང་_སྤུ་འདུ་ནང་	Jenkanang
Samar ས་དམར་	Jenkanang Pudunang རྒྱན་ག་ནང་_སྤུ་འདུ་ནང་	Pudunang
Samar ས་དམར་	Sharri ཤར་རི་	Sharri
Sangbay གསང་སྦས་	Mochhu མོ་ཆུ་	Bibi
Sangbay གསང་སྦས་	Mochhu མོ་ཆུ་	Dongtse
Sangbay གསང་སྦས་	Mochhu མོ་ཆུ་	Mochhu
Sangbay གསང་སྦས་	Nakha Tashigang ན་ཀ་_བཀྲིས་སྒང་	Nakha
Sangbay གསང་སྦས་	Nakha Tashigang ན་ཀ་_བཀྲིས་སྒང་	Nakhatshochen
Sangbay གསང་སྦས་	Nakha Tashigang ན་ཀ་_བཀྲིས་སྒང་	Tingma
Sangbay གསང་སྦས་	Nakha Tashigang ན་ཀ་_བཀྲིས་སྒང་	Tashigang
Sangbay གསང་སྦས་	Anakha Shepji ཨ་ན་ཁ་_ཤེསཔ་སྦྱིས་	Shaba
Sangbay གསང་སྦས་	Anakha Shepji ཨ་ན་ཁ་_ཤེསཔ་སྦྱིས་	Shepji
Sangbay གསང་སྦས་	Shema Yaba ཤེས་མ་_ཡ་བཱ་	Chinga
Sangbay གསང་སྦས་	Shema Yaba ཤེས་མ་_ཡ་བཱ་	Shema
Sangbay གསང་སྦས་	Shema Yaba ཤེས་མ་_ཡ་བཱ་	Yaba
Sangbay གསང་སྦས་	Sangbay Ama གསང་སྦས་ཨ་མ་	Ama
Sangbay གསང་སྦས་	Sangbay Ama གསང་སྦས་ཨ་མ་	Tsanglingna
Sangbay གསང་སྦས་	Sangbay Ama གསང་སྦས་ཨ་མ་	Gyeldrakha
Sangbay གསང་སྦས་	Sangbay Ama གསང་སྦས་ཨ་མ་	Nakhekha
Uesu དབུས་སུ་	Betso Doomchhog སྦས་གཙོ་_དུམ་མཆོག་	Betso
Uesu དབུས་སུ་	Betso Doomchhog སྦས་གཙོ་_དུམ་མཆོག་	Doomchhog
Uesu དབུས་སུ་	Geyruna Karnag དགེ་རུན་_དཀར་ནག་	Geyruna
Uesu དབུས་སུ་	Geyruna Karnag དགེ་རུན་_དཀར་ནག་	Karnag
Uesu དབུས་སུ་	Pajekha Sangkiri སྤ་རྗེ་ཁ་_གསང་ཀི་རི་	Pagekha
Uesu དབུས་སུ་	Pajekha Sangkiri སྤ་རྗེ་ཁ་_གསང་ཀི་རི་	Sangkiri
Uesu དབུས་སུ་	Kipri Tagchhu སྐིདཔ་རི་_སྟག་ཆུ་	Bangyena
Uesu དབུས་སུ་	Kipri Tagchhu སྐིདཔ་རི་_སྟག་ཆུ་	Dranggoen
Uesu དབུས་སུ་	Kipri Tagchhu སྐིདཔ་རི་_སྟག་ཆུ་	Kipri
Uesu དབུས་སུ་	Kipri Tagchhu སྐིདཔ་རི་_སྟག་ཆུ་	Tagchhu
Uesu དབུས་སུ་	Kipri Tagchhu སྐིདཔ་རི་_སྟག་ཆུ་	Takchugoenpa
Uesu དབུས་སུ་	Tshaphel Tsiloongkha ཚྭ་འཕེལ་_རྩི་ལུང་ཁ་	Goensakha
Uesu དབུས་སུ་	Tshaphel Tsiloongkha ཚྭ་འཕེལ་_རྩི་ལུང་ཁ་	Hagoenpa
Uesu དབུས་སུ་	Tshaphel Tsiloongkha ཚྭ་འཕེལ་_རྩི་ལུང་ཁ་	Tsiloongkha
Uesu དབུས་སུ་	Tshaphel Tsiloongkha ཚྭ་འཕེལ་_རྩི་ལུང་ཁ་	Tshaphel

=== Lhuntse District ===
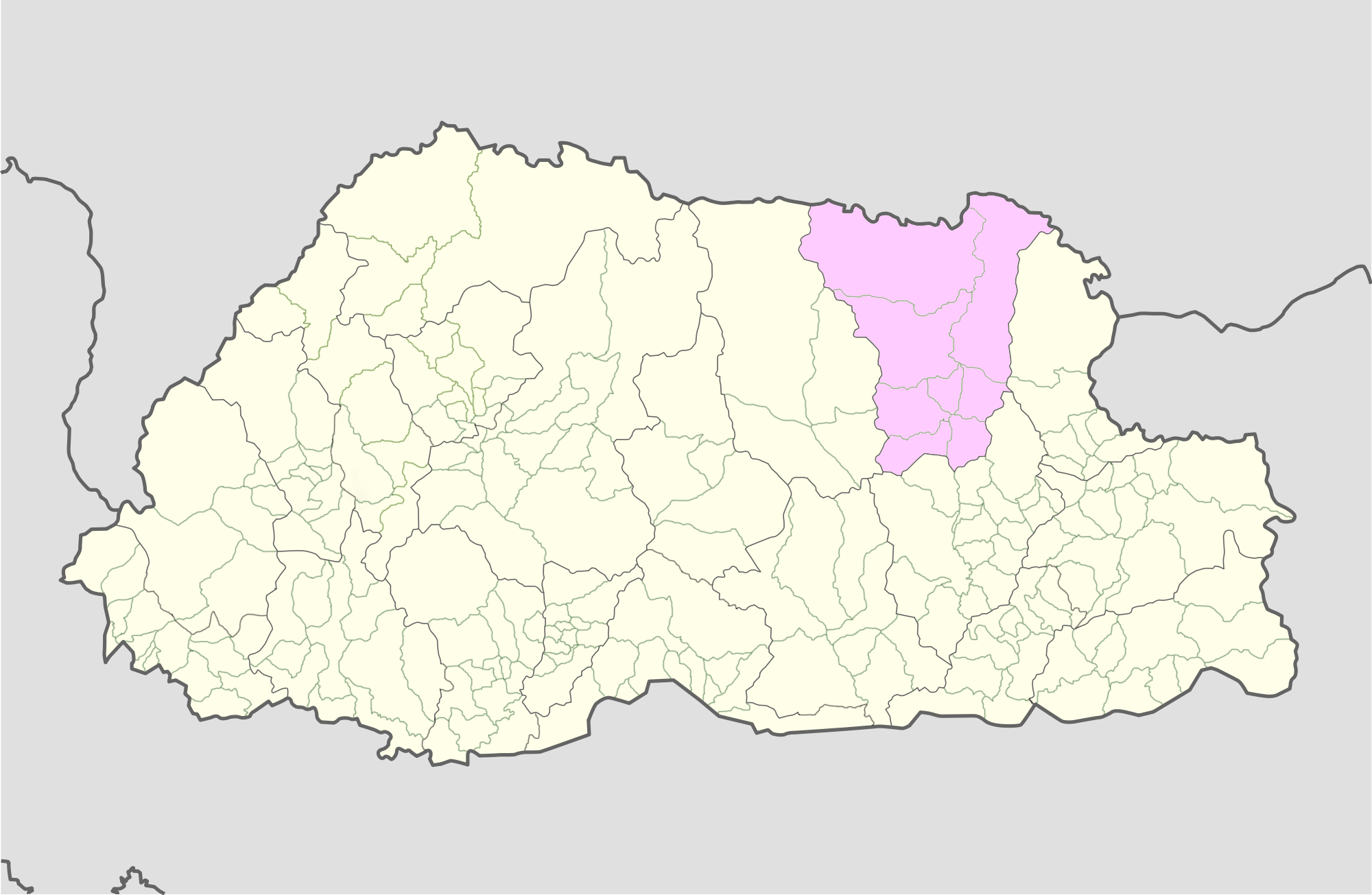
Lhuntse District

Gewog	Chiwog	Village
Gangzur སྒང་ཟུར་	Ney གནས་	Ney
Gangzur སྒང་ཟུར་	Kyidloong Somshing སྐྱིད་ལུང་_སོམ་ཤིང་	Lingabi
Gangzur སྒང་ཟུར་	Kyidloong Somshing སྐྱིད་ལུང་_སོམ་ཤིང་	Magar
Gangzur སྒང་ཟུར་	Kyidloong Somshing སྐྱིད་ལུང་_སོམ་ཤིང་	Kyidloong
Gangzur སྒང་ཟུར་	Kyidloong Somshing སྐྱིད་ལུང་_སོམ་ཤིང་	Changray
Gangzur སྒང་ཟུར་	Kyidloong Somshing སྐྱིད་ལུང་_སོམ་ཤིང་	Samling
Gangzur སྒང་ཟུར་	Kyidloong Somshing སྐྱིད་ལུང་_སོམ་ཤིང་	Khamphu
Gangzur སྒང་ཟུར་	Kyidloong Somshing སྐྱིད་ལུང་_སོམ་ཤིང་	Lekpa
Gangzur སྒང་ཟུར་	Kyidloong Somshing སྐྱིད་ལུང་_སོམ་ཤིང་	Rotpa
Gangzur སྒང་ཟུར་	Kyidloong Somshing སྐྱིད་ལུང་_སོམ་ཤིང་	Shomshing
Gangzur སྒང་ཟུར་	Kyidloong Somshing སྐྱིད་ལུང་_སོམ་ཤིང་	Tsholing
Gangzur སྒང་ཟུར་	Thrima Shawa Zhamling ཁྲི་མ་_ཤ་ཝ་_ཞམ་གླིང་	Thrima
Gangzur སྒང་ཟུར་	Thrima Shawa Zhamling ཁྲི་མ་_ཤ་ཝ་_ཞམ་གླིང་	Zhamling
Gangzur སྒང་ཟུར་	Thrima Shawa Zhamling ཁྲི་མ་_ཤ་ཝ་_ཞམ་གླིང་	Shawa
Gangzur སྒང་ཟུར་	Thrima Shawa Zhamling ཁྲི་མ་_ཤ་ཝ་_ཞམ་གླིང་	Khaujoong
Gangzur སྒང་ཟུར་	Thrima Shawa Zhamling ཁྲི་མ་_ཤ་ཝ་_ཞམ་གླིང་	Youngmaling
Gangzur སྒང་ཟུར་	Nyimzhong Tongling ཉིམ་གཞོང་_སྟོང་གླིང་	Namseygang
Gangzur སྒང་ཟུར་	Nyimzhong Tongling ཉིམ་གཞོང་_སྟོང་གླིང་	Sapho
Gangzur སྒང་ཟུར་	Nyimzhong Tongling ཉིམ་གཞོང་_སྟོང་གླིང་	Amchi
Gangzur སྒང་ཟུར་	Nyimzhong Tongling ཉིམ་གཞོང་_སྟོང་གླིང་	Chhesa
Gangzur སྒང་ཟུར་	Nyimzhong Tongling ཉིམ་གཞོང་_སྟོང་གླིང་	Jalamzur
Gangzur སྒང་ཟུར་	Nyimzhong Tongling ཉིམ་གཞོང་_སྟོང་གླིང་	Nyimzhong
Gangzur སྒང་ཟུར་	Nyimzhong Tongling ཉིམ་གཞོང་_སྟོང་གླིང་	Tangsa
Gangzur སྒང་ཟུར་	Nyimzhong Tongling ཉིམ་གཞོང་_སྟོང་གླིང་	Taushing
Gangzur སྒང་ཟུར་	Nyimzhong Tongling ཉིམ་གཞོང་_སྟོང་གླིང་	Taushinggoenpa
Gangzur སྒང་ཟུར་	Nyimzhong Tongling ཉིམ་གཞོང་_སྟོང་གླིང་	Tongling
Gangzur སྒང་ཟུར་	Nyimzhong Tongling ཉིམ་གཞོང་_སྟོང་གླིང་	Thimyul
Gangzur སྒང་ཟུར་	Jang Ngar བྱང་_ངར་	Dhuthay
Gangzur སྒང་ཟུར་	Jang Ngar བྱང་_ངར་	Jang
Gangzur སྒང་ཟུར་	Jang Ngar བྱང་_ངར་	Napzala
Gangzur སྒང་ཟུར་	Jang Ngar བྱང་_ངར་	Phatala
Gangzur སྒང་ཟུར་	Jang Ngar བྱང་_ངར་	Tagzibar
Gangzur སྒང་ཟུར་	Jang Ngar བྱང་_ངར་	Denkaling
Gangzur སྒང་ཟུར་	Jang Ngar བྱང་_ངར་	Gangzur
Gangzur སྒང་ཟུར་	Jang Ngar བྱང་_ངར་	Ngar/Nyar
Khoma མཁོ་མ་	Rolmateng Tsangngo རོལ་མ་སྟེངས་_གཙང་ངོ་	Rolmateng
Khoma མཁོ་མ་	Rolmateng Tsangngo རོལ་མ་སྟེངས་_གཙང་ངོ་	Tsang-ngo
Khoma མཁོ་མ་	Berpa Khoma བེར་པ་_མཁོ་མ་	Khoema
Khoma མཁོ་མ་	Berpa Khoma བེར་པ་_མཁོ་མ་	Khoma
Khoma མཁོ་མ་	Berpa Khoma བེར་པ་_མཁོ་མ་	Lukchu
Khoma མཁོ་མ་	Berpa Khoma བེར་པ་_མཁོ་མ་	Berpa
Khoma མཁོ་མ་	Berpa Khoma བེར་པ་_མཁོ་མ་	Pengtse
Khoma མཁོ་མ་	Berpa Khoma བེར་པ་_མཁོ་མ་	Nyalamdung
Khoma མཁོ་མ་	Babtong Dragteng བབ་སྟོང་_གྲག་སྟེང་	Babtong
Khoma མཁོ་མ་	Babtong Dragteng བབ་སྟོང་_གྲག་སྟེང་	Dragteng
Khoma མཁོ་མ་	Babtong Dragteng བབ་སྟོང་_གྲག་སྟེང་	Kemtshong
Khoma མཁོ་མ་	Babtong Dragteng བབ་སྟོང་_གྲག་སྟེང་	Goenkhar
Khoma མཁོ་མ་	Babtong Dragteng བབ་སྟོང་_གྲག་སྟེང་	Karphu
Khoma མཁོ་མ་	Babtong Dragteng བབ་སྟོང་_གྲག་སྟེང་	Laber
Khoma མཁོ་མ་	Gangla Kholma སྒང་ལ་_འཁོལ་མ་	Gangla
Khoma མཁོ་མ་	Gangla Kholma སྒང་ལ་_འཁོལ་མ་	Lawa
Khoma མཁོ་མ་	Gangla Kholma སྒང་ལ་_འཁོལ་མ་	Serphu
Khoma མཁོ་མ་	Gangla Kholma སྒང་ལ་_འཁོལ་མ་	Taya
Khoma མཁོ་མ་	Gangla Kholma སྒང་ལ་_འཁོལ་མ་	Kholma
Khoma མཁོ་མ་	Pangkhar སབང་མཁར་	Pangkhar
Khoma མཁོ་མ་	Pangkhar སབང་མཁར་	Zangkhar
Jarey རྒྱ་རས་	Yumchhe ཡུམ་ཆེ་	Yumchhe
Jarey རྒྱ་རས་	Kharchung མཁར་ཅུང་	Kharchung/Pam
Jarey རྒྱ་རས་	Ladrong ལ་གྲོང་	Ladrong
Jarey རྒྱ་རས་	Artobi Ngangngae ཨར་ཏོ་སྦིས་_ངང་ངེས་	Ngang Ngae
Jarey རྒྱ་རས་	Artobi Ngangngae ཨར་ཏོ་སྦིས་_ངང་ངེས་	Jarey
Jarey རྒྱ་རས་	Artobi Ngangngae ཨར་ཏོ་སྦིས་_ངང་ངེས་	Trapashing
Jarey རྒྱ་རས་	Yabi Zangkhar ཡ་སྦིས་_བཟང་མཁར་	Changkhala
Jarey རྒྱ་རས་	Yabi Zangkhar ཡ་སྦིས་_བཟང་མཁར་	Wayang
Jarey རྒྱ་རས་	Yabi Zangkhar ཡ་སྦིས་_བཟང་མཁར་	Yabi
Kurtoed ཀུར་སྟོད་	Jasabi Ugyenphoog རྒྱ་ས་སྦི་_ཨོ་རྒྱན་ཕུག་	Jasabi
Kurtoed ཀུར་སྟོད་	Jasabi Ugyenphoog རྒྱ་ས་སྦི་_ཨོ་རྒྱན་ཕུག་	Tergang
Kurtoed ཀུར་སྟོད་	Jasabi Ugyenphoog རྒྱ་ས་སྦི་_ཨོ་རྒྱན་ཕུག་	Uygenphoog
Kurtoed ཀུར་སྟོད་	Chagdzom Chhusa ལྕགས་འཛོམས་_ཆུ་ས་	Chagdzom
Kurtoed ཀུར་སྟོད་	Chagdzom Chhusa ལྕགས་འཛོམས་_ཆུ་ས་	Chhusa
Kurtoed ཀུར་སྟོད་	Chagdzom Chhusa ལྕགས་འཛོམས་_ཆུ་ས་	Drabling
Kurtoed ཀུར་སྟོད་	Chagdzom Chhusa ལྕགས་འཛོམས་_ཆུ་ས་	Gurta
Kurtoed ཀུར་སྟོད་	Chagdzom Chhusa ལྕགས་འཛོམས་_ཆུ་ས་	Nagling
Kurtoed ཀུར་སྟོད་	Chagdzom Chhusa ལྕགས་འཛོམས་_ཆུ་ས་	Pirbee
Kurtoed ཀུར་སྟོད་	Chagdzom Chhusa ལྕགས་འཛོམས་_ཆུ་ས་	Shangthongling
Kurtoed ཀུར་སྟོད་	Chagdzom Chhusa ལྕགས་འཛོམས་_ཆུ་ས་	Thangbi
Kurtoed ཀུར་སྟོད་	Chagdzom Chhusa ལྕགས་འཛོམས་_ཆུ་ས་	Wamdrang
Kurtoed ཀུར་སྟོད་	Tangroong Wawel སྟང་རུང་_ཝ་ཝལ་	Garong
Kurtoed ཀུར་སྟོད་	Tangroong Wawel སྟང་རུང་_ཝ་ཝལ་	Goshingpang
Kurtoed ཀུར་སྟོད་	Tangroong Wawel སྟང་རུང་_ཝ་ཝལ་	Ruling
Kurtoed ཀུར་སྟོད་	Tangroong Wawel སྟང་རུང་_ཝ་ཝལ་	Sershong
Kurtoed ཀུར་སྟོད་	Tangroong Wawel སྟང་རུང་_ཝ་ཝལ་	Maenbi
Kurtoed ཀུར་སྟོད་	Tangroong Wawel སྟང་རུང་_ཝ་ཝལ་	Nyaray
Kurtoed ཀུར་སྟོད་	Tangroong Wawel སྟང་རུང་_ཝ་ཝལ་	Shauzhong
Kurtoed ཀུར་སྟོད་	Tangroong Wawel སྟང་རུང་_ཝ་ཝལ་	Churchuma
Kurtoed ཀུར་སྟོད་	Tangroong Wawel སྟང་རུང་_ཝ་ཝལ་	Signar
Kurtoed ཀུར་སྟོད་	Tangroong Wawel སྟང་རུང་_ཝ་ཝལ་	Wawel
Kurtoed ཀུར་སྟོད་	Tangroong Wawel སྟང་རུང་_ཝ་ཝལ་	Taling
Kurtoed ཀུར་སྟོད་	Tangroong Wawel སྟང་རུང་_ཝ་ཝལ་	Tangroong
Kurtoed ཀུར་སྟོད་	Tangroong Wawel སྟང་རུང་_ཝ་ཝལ་	Thuenpey
Kurtoed ཀུར་སྟོད་	Tangroong Wawel སྟང་རུང་_ཝ་ཝལ་	Zongsar
Kurtoed ཀུར་སྟོད་	Dungkar གདུང་དཀར་	Arjhaling
Kurtoed ཀུར་སྟོད་	Dungkar གདུང་དཀར་	Chongsa
Kurtoed ཀུར་སྟོད་	Dungkar གདུང་དཀར་	Chhanyalgang
Kurtoed ཀུར་སྟོད་	Dungkar གདུང་དཀར་	Darjaygang
Kurtoed ཀུར་སྟོད་	Dungkar གདུང་དཀར་	Dongmaed
Kurtoed ཀུར་སྟོད་	Dungkar གདུང་དཀར་	Dungkar
Kurtoed ཀུར་སྟོད་	Dungkar གདུང་དཀར་	Jangtse
Kurtoed ཀུར་སྟོད་	Dungkar གདུང་དཀར་	Lamsaykapa
Kurtoed ཀུར་སྟོད་	Dungkar གདུང་དཀར་	Sugpee
Kurtoed ཀུར་སྟོད་	Dungkar གདུང་དཀར་	Tongmay
Kurtoed ཀུར་སྟོད་	Dungkar གདུང་དཀར་	Takharme
Kurtoed ཀུར་སྟོད་	Dungkar གདུང་དཀར་	Zimpong
Kurtoed ཀུར་སྟོད་	Dungkar གདུང་དཀར་	Chaktamin
Kurtoed ཀུར་སྟོད་	Dungkar གདུང་དཀར་	Lamsabi
Kurtoed ཀུར་སྟོད་	Dungkar གདུང་དཀར་	Serphu
Kurtoed ཀུར་སྟོད་	Dungkar གདུང་དཀར་	Sewel
Kurtoed ཀུར་སྟོད་	Dungkar གདུང་དཀར་	Sumdhang
Kurtoed ཀུར་སྟོད་	Dungkar གདུང་དཀར་	Thongjaling
Kurtoed ཀུར་སྟོད་	Dungkar གདུང་དཀར་	Thowa
Kurtoed ཀུར་སྟོད་	Tabi རྟ་སྦིས་	Tabi
Kurtoed ཀུར་སྟོད་	Tabi རྟ་སྦིས་	Tagdzong
Menbi སྨན་སྦིས་	Nyaibi Zhungkhar ཉའི་སྦིས་_གཞུང་མཁར་	Chalibi
Menbi སྨན་སྦིས་	Nyaibi Zhungkhar ཉའི་སྦིས་_གཞུང་མཁར་	Dangsangoenpa
Menbi སྨན་སྦིས་	Nyaibi Zhungkhar ཉའི་སྦིས་_གཞུང་མཁར་	Dungkardowa
Menbi སྨན་སྦིས་	Nyaibi Zhungkhar ཉའི་སྦིས་_གཞུང་མཁར་	Gangkhar
Menbi སྨན་སྦིས་	Nyaibi Zhungkhar ཉའི་སྦིས་_གཞུང་མཁར་	Garapho
Menbi སྨན་སྦིས་	Nyaibi Zhungkhar ཉའི་སྦིས་_གཞུང་མཁར་	Kharsa
Menbi སྨན་སྦིས་	Nyaibi Zhungkhar ཉའི་སྦིས་_གཞུང་མཁར་	Namdang
Menbi སྨན་སྦིས་	Nyaibi Zhungkhar ཉའི་སྦིས་_གཞུང་མཁར་	Nyaibi
Menbi སྨན་སྦིས་	Nyaibi Zhungkhar ཉའི་སྦིས་_གཞུང་མཁར་	Pelrigoenpa
Menbi སྨན་སྦིས་	Nyaibi Zhungkhar ཉའི་སྦིས་_གཞུང་མཁར་	Samcheling
Menbi སྨན་སྦིས་	Nyaibi Zhungkhar ཉའི་སྦིས་_གཞུང་མཁར་	Samling
Menbi སྨན་སྦིས་	Nyaibi Zhungkhar ཉའི་སྦིས་_གཞུང་མཁར་	Shangrabi
Menbi སྨན་སྦིས་	Nyaibi Zhungkhar ཉའི་སྦིས་_གཞུང་མཁར་	Shormaed
Menbi སྨན་སྦིས་	Nyaibi Zhungkhar ཉའི་སྦིས་_གཞུང་མཁར་	Tungkhar
Menbi སྨན་སྦིས་	Nyaibi Zhungkhar ཉའི་སྦིས་_གཞུང་མཁར་	Youngrab
Menbi སྨན་སྦིས་	Nyaibi Zhungkhar ཉའི་སྦིས་_གཞུང་མཁར་	Zhungkhar
Menbi སྨན་སྦིས་	Maenjabi སྨན་བྱ་སྦིས་	Dangling
Menbi སྨན་སྦིས་	Maenjabi སྨན་བྱ་སྦིས་	Khochen
Menbi སྨན་སྦིས་	Maenjabi སྨན་བྱ་སྦིས་	Maenjabi
Menbi སྨན་སྦིས་	Maenjabi སྨན་བྱ་སྦིས་	Sershingbi
Menbi སྨན་སྦིས་	Maenjabi སྨན་བྱ་སྦིས་	Yanglagoenpa
Menbi སྨན་སྦིས་	Maenjabi སྨན་བྱ་སྦིས་	Rawabi
Menbi སྨན་སྦིས་	Maenjabi སྨན་བྱ་སྦིས་	Rawabi Goenpa
Menbi སྨན་སྦིས་	Maenjabi སྨན་བྱ་སྦིས་	Yomaed
Menbi སྨན་སྦིས་	Tagmochhu Gorgan སྟག་མོ་ཆུ་_སྒོར་སྒན་	Tagmochhu
Menbi སྨན་སྦིས་	Tagmochhu Gorgan སྟག་མོ་ཆུ་_སྒོར་སྒན་	Youngshingphel
Menbi སྨན་སྦིས་	Tagmochhu Gorgan སྟག་མོ་ཆུ་_སྒོར་སྒན་	Boushong
Menbi སྨན་སྦིས་	Tagmochhu Gorgan སྟག་མོ་ཆུ་_སྒོར་སྒན་	Bamendrangsa
Menbi སྨན་སྦིས་	Tagmochhu Gorgan སྟག་མོ་ཆུ་_སྒོར་སྒན་	Gorgan
Menbi སྨན་སྦིས་	Tagmochhu Gorgan སྟག་མོ་ཆུ་_སྒོར་སྒན་	Takayla
Menbi སྨན་སྦིས་	Phagidoong ཕག་གི་དུང་	Bariphu
Menbi སྨན་སྦིས་	Phagidoong ཕག་གི་དུང་	Chengaling
Menbi སྨན་སྦིས་	Phagidoong ཕག་གི་དུང་	Dromzhong
Menbi སྨན་སྦིས་	Phagidoong ཕག་གི་དུང་	Gamshing
Menbi སྨན་སྦིས་	Phagidoong ཕག་གི་དུང་	Kasithang
Menbi སྨན་སྦིས་	Phagidoong ཕག་གི་དུང་	Langphog
Menbi སྨན་སྦིས་	Phagidoong ཕག་གི་དུང་	Oumzor
Menbi སྨན་སྦིས་	Phagidoong ཕག་གི་དུང་	Ledong
Menbi སྨན་སྦིས་	Phagidoong ཕག་གི་དུང་	Lekpagang
Menbi སྨན་སྦིས་	Phagidoong ཕག་གི་དུང་	Manigang
Menbi སྨན་སྦིས་	Phagidoong ཕག་གི་དུང་	Nadrang
Menbi སྨན་སྦིས་	Phagidoong ཕག་གི་དུང་	Ngamaling
Menbi སྨན་སྦིས་	Phagidoong ཕག་གི་དུང་	Tangpa
Menbi སྨན་སྦིས་	Phagidoong ཕག་གི་དུང་	Phagidroong
Menbi སྨན་སྦིས་	Kamdhar Moormo སྐམ་རྡར་_མུར་མོ་	Dosagang
Menbi སྨན་སྦིས་	Kamdhar Moormo སྐམ་རྡར་_མུར་མོ་	Kamdhar
Menbi སྨན་སྦིས་	Kamdhar Moormo སྐམ་རྡར་_མུར་མོ་	Katog
Menbi སྨན་སྦིས་	Kamdhar Moormo སྐམ་རྡར་_མུར་མོ་	Khampaling
Menbi སྨན་སྦིས་	Kamdhar Moormo སྐམ་རྡར་_མུར་མོ་	Khashaling
Menbi སྨན་སྦིས་	Kamdhar Moormo སྐམ་རྡར་_མུར་མོ་	Kimphay
Menbi སྨན་སྦིས་	Kamdhar Moormo སྐམ་རྡར་_མུར་མོ་	Kusumphay
Menbi སྨན་སྦིས་	Kamdhar Moormo སྐམ་རྡར་_མུར་མོ་	Larjab
Menbi སྨན་སྦིས་	Kamdhar Moormo སྐམ་རྡར་_མུར་མོ་	Lugarpang
Menbi སྨན་སྦིས་	Kamdhar Moormo སྐམ་རྡར་_མུར་མོ་	Moormo
Menbi སྨན་སྦིས་	Kamdhar Moormo སྐམ་རྡར་_མུར་མོ་	Namnangbi
Menbi སྨན་སྦིས་	Kamdhar Moormo སྐམ་རྡར་_མུར་མོ་	Pangsar
Menbi སྨན་སྦིས་	Kamdhar Moormo སྐམ་རྡར་_མུར་མོ་	Petsizor
Menbi སྨན་སྦིས་	Kamdhar Moormo སྐམ་རྡར་_མུར་མོ་	Phungshingang
Menbi སྨན་སྦིས་	Kamdhar Moormo སྐམ་རྡར་_མུར་མོ་	Rewaling
Menbi སྨན་སྦིས་	Kamdhar Moormo སྐམ་རྡར་_མུར་མོ་	Tashiling
Menbi སྨན་སྦིས་	Kamdhar Moormo སྐམ་རྡར་_མུར་མོ་	Thekcholing
Menbi སྨན་སྦིས་	Kamdhar Moormo སྐམ་རྡར་_མུར་མོ་	Thongjaling
Menbi སྨན་སྦིས་	Kamdhar Moormo སྐམ་རྡར་_མུར་མོ་	Tongmakhar
Menbi སྨན་སྦིས་	Kamdhar Moormo སྐམ་རྡར་_མུར་མོ་	Tsampdemo
Menbi སྨན་སྦིས་	Kamdhar Moormo སྐམ་རྡར་_མུར་མོ་	Zarthang
Menbi སྨན་སྦིས་	Kamdhar Moormo སྐམ་རྡར་_མུར་མོ་	Bumpashing
Menbi སྨན་སྦིས་	Kamdhar Moormo སྐམ་རྡར་_མུར་མོ་	Zarthang Goenpa
Menbi སྨན་སྦིས་	Kamdhar Moormo སྐམ་རྡར་_མུར་མོ་	Zungphu
Metsho སྨད་མཚོ་	Oonggar ཨུང་སྒར་	Oonggar
Metsho སྨད་མཚོ་	Zhongmaed གཞོང་སྨད་	Zhongmaed
Metsho སྨད་མཚོ་	Bamdhir Yurung བང་འདིར་_གཡུ་རུང་	Bamdhir
Metsho སྨད་མཚོ་	Bamdhir Yurung བང་འདིར་_གཡུ་རུང་	Yurung
Metsho སྨད་མཚོ་	Bamdhir Yurung བང་འདིར་_གཡུ་རུང་	Tshochen
Metsho སྨད་མཚོ་	Bamdhir Yurung བང་འདིར་_གཡུ་རུང་	Balam
Metsho སྨད་མཚོ་	Gortshom Tshangthromaed སྒོར་ཚོམས་_ཚང་ཁྲོམ་སྨད་	Balam/Nimalawa
Metsho སྨད་མཚོ་	Gortshom Tshangthromaed སྒོར་ཚོམས་_ཚང་ཁྲོམ་སྨད་	Changchen
Metsho སྨད་མཚོ་	Gortshom Tshangthromaed སྒོར་ཚོམས་_ཚང་ཁྲོམ་སྨད་	Changshinpokpa
Metsho སྨད་མཚོ་	Gortshom Tshangthromaed སྒོར་ཚོམས་_ཚང་ཁྲོམ་སྨད་	Thangthrom Maed
Metsho སྨད་མཚོ་	Gortshom Tshangthromaed སྒོར་ཚོམས་_ཚང་ཁྲོམ་སྨད་	Thangthrom Maed Goenpa
Metsho སྨད་མཚོ་	Gortshom Tshangthromaed སྒོར་ཚོམས་_ཚང་ཁྲོམ་སྨད་	Drukla
Metsho སྨད་མཚོ་	Gortshom Tshangthromaed སྒོར་ཚོམས་_ཚང་ཁྲོམ་སྨད་	Dulebi
Metsho སྨད་མཚོ་	Gortshom Tshangthromaed སྒོར་ཚོམས་_ཚང་ཁྲོམ་སྨད་	Gongdar
Metsho སྨད་མཚོ་	Gortshom Tshangthromaed སྒོར་ཚོམས་_ཚང་ཁྲོམ་སྨད་	Gortshom
Metsho སྨད་མཚོ་	Gortshom Tshangthromaed སྒོར་ཚོམས་_ཚང་ཁྲོམ་སྨད་	Gulipang
Metsho སྨད་མཚོ་	Gortshom Tshangthromaed སྒོར་ཚོམས་_ཚང་ཁྲོམ་སྨད་	Janakchen
Metsho སྨད་མཚོ་	Gortshom Tshangthromaed སྒོར་ཚོམས་_ཚང་ཁྲོམ་སྨད་	Kermademo
Metsho སྨད་མཚོ་	Gortshom Tshangthromaed སྒོར་ཚོམས་_ཚང་ཁྲོམ་སྨད་	Khenye Lhakhang
Metsho སྨད་མཚོ་	Gortshom Tshangthromaed སྒོར་ཚོམས་_ཚང་ཁྲོམ་སྨད་	Lhakhangtshawa
Metsho སྨད་མཚོ་	Gortshom Tshangthromaed སྒོར་ཚོམས་_ཚང་ཁྲོམ་སྨད་	Mangdhir
Metsho སྨད་མཚོ་	Gortshom Tshangthromaed སྒོར་ཚོམས་_ཚང་ཁྲོམ་སྨད་	Mukpakhar
Metsho སྨད་མཚོ་	Gortshom Tshangthromaed སྒོར་ཚོམས་_ཚང་ཁྲོམ་སྨད་	Samdang
Metsho སྨད་མཚོ་	Gortshom Tshangthromaed སྒོར་ཚོམས་_ཚང་ཁྲོམ་སྨད་	Serbuchuka
Metsho སྨད་མཚོ་	Gortshom Tshangthromaed སྒོར་ཚོམས་_ཚང་ཁྲོམ་སྨད་	Singyebi
Metsho སྨད་མཚོ་	Gortshom Tshangthromaed སྒོར་ཚོམས་_ཚང་ཁྲོམ་སྨད་	Tachung
Metsho སྨད་མཚོ་	Gortshom Tshangthromaed སྒོར་ཚོམས་_ཚང་ཁྲོམ་སྨད་	Tonzibi
Metsho སྨད་མཚོ་	Gortshom Tshangthromaed སྒོར་ཚོམས་_ཚང་ཁྲོམ་སྨད་	Yamalung Goenpa
Metsho སྨད་མཚོ་	Gortshom Tshangthromaed སྒོར་ཚོམས་_ཚང་ཁྲོམ་སྨད་	Tshodrang
Metsho སྨད་མཚོ་	Gortshom Tshangthromaed སྒོར་ཚོམས་_ཚང་ཁྲོམ་སྨད་	Waney
Metsho སྨད་མཚོ་	Gortshom Tshangthromaed སྒོར་ཚོམས་_ཚང་ཁྲོམ་སྨད་	Yozer Goenpa
Metsho སྨད་མཚོ་	Gortshom Tshangthromaed སྒོར་ཚོམས་_ཚང་ཁྲོམ་སྨད་	Yokpaling
Metsho སྨད་མཚོ་	Obi Tongthrong ཨོ་སྦི་_སྟོང་འཕྲོང་	Tongthrong
Metsho སྨད་མཚོ་	Obi Tongthrong ཨོ་སྦི་_སྟོང་འཕྲོང་	Dowaletang
Metsho སྨད་མཚོ་	Obi Tongthrong ཨོ་སྦི་_སྟོང་འཕྲོང་	Pangshingmey
Metsho སྨད་མཚོ་	Obi Tongthrong ཨོ་སྦི་_སྟོང་འཕྲོང་	Obi
Metsho སྨད་མཚོ་	Obi Tongthrong ཨོ་སྦི་_སྟོང་འཕྲོང་	Pholadowa
Minjay སྨིན་རྒྱས་	Amdrangchhu Zham ཨམ་བྲངས་ཆུ་_ཞམ་	Amdrangchhu
Minjay སྨིན་རྒྱས་	Amdrangchhu Zham ཨམ་བྲངས་ཆུ་_ཞམ་	Chengling
Minjay སྨིན་རྒྱས་	Amdrangchhu Zham ཨམ་བྲངས་ཆུ་_ཞམ་	Zham
Minjay སྨིན་རྒྱས་	Chusa Legshogang ཅུ་ས་_ལེགས་ཤོ་སྒང་	Chusa
Minjay སྨིན་རྒྱས་	Chusa Legshogang ཅུ་ས་_ལེགས་ཤོ་སྒང་	Draledowa
Minjay སྨིན་རྒྱས་	Chusa Legshogang ཅུ་ས་_ལེགས་ཤོ་སྒང་	Legpachu
Minjay སྨིན་རྒྱས་	Chusa Legshogang ཅུ་ས་_ལེགས་ཤོ་སྒང་	Legchugang
Minjay སྨིན་རྒྱས་	Chusa Legshogang ཅུ་ས་_ལེགས་ཤོ་སྒང་	Legshogang
Minjay སྨིན་རྒྱས་	Chusa Legshogang ཅུ་ས་_ལེགས་ཤོ་སྒང་	Pumogang
Minjay སྨིན་རྒྱས་	Draaggong Jalang བྲག་སྒོང་_བྱ་གླང་	Dhokpabi
Minjay སྨིན་རྒྱས་	Draaggong Jalang བྲག་སྒོང་_བྱ་གླང་	Draag-gong
Minjay སྨིན་རྒྱས་	Draaggong Jalang བྲག་སྒོང་_བྱ་གླང་	Draag-gong Goenpa
Minjay སྨིན་རྒྱས་	Draaggong Jalang བྲག་སྒོང་_བྱ་གླང་	Jabum
Minjay སྨིན་རྒྱས་	Draaggong Jalang བྲག་སྒོང་_བྱ་གླང་	Jalang
Minjay སྨིན་རྒྱས་	Draaggong Jalang བྲག་སྒོང་_བྱ་གླང་	Keroo
Minjay སྨིན་རྒྱས་	Draaggong Jalang བྲག་སྒོང་_བྱ་གླང་	Phangchenbi
Minjay སྨིན་རྒྱས་	Boodur Kupinyalsa བུ་དུར་_སྐུ་པི་ཉལ་ས་	Boo-dur
Minjay སྨིན་རྒྱས་	Boodur Kupinyalsa བུ་དུར་_སྐུ་པི་ཉལ་ས་	Kupi-nyalsa
Minjay སྨིན་རྒྱས་	Minjey Wangzhing སྨིན་རྒྱས་_དབང་ཞིང་	Minjey
Minjay སྨིན་རྒྱས་	Minjey Wangzhing སྨིན་རྒྱས་_དབང་ཞིང་	Nyaka
Minjay སྨིན་རྒྱས་	Minjey Wangzhing སྨིན་རྒྱས་_དབང་ཞིང་	Sershing
Minjay སྨིན་རྒྱས་	Minjey Wangzhing སྨིན་རྒྱས་_དབང་ཞིང་	Tongling
Minjay སྨིན་རྒྱས་	Minjey Wangzhing སྨིན་རྒྱས་_དབང་ཞིང་	Wangzhing
Tsenkhar སཙན་མཁར་	Gonyid Wambur སྒོ་ཉིད་_ཝམ་བུར་	Wambur
Tsenkhar སཙན་མཁར་	Gonyid Wambur སྒོ་ཉིད་_ཝམ་བུར་	Chim Gong
Tsenkhar སཙན་མཁར་	Gonyid Wambur སྒོ་ཉིད་_ཝམ་བུར་	Chungkha
Tsenkhar སཙན་མཁར་	Gonyid Wambur སྒོ་ཉིད་_ཝམ་བུར་	Dagarthang
Tsenkhar སཙན་མཁར་	Gonyid Wambur སྒོ་ཉིད་_ཝམ་བུར་	Jarkang
Tsenkhar སཙན་མཁར་	Gonyid Wambur སྒོ་ཉིད་_ཝམ་བུར་	Lagay
Tsenkhar སཙན་མཁར་	Gonyid Wambur སྒོ་ཉིད་_ཝམ་བུར་	Go-nyid
Tsenkhar སཙན་མཁར་	Gonyid Wambur སྒོ་ཉིད་_ཝམ་བུར་	Khablang
Tsenkhar སཙན་མཁར་	Gonyid Wambur སྒོ་ཉིད་_ཝམ་བུར་	Kiphung
Tsenkhar སཙན་མཁར་	Gonyid Wambur སྒོ་ཉིད་_ཝམ་བུར་	Sokarom
Tsenkhar སཙན་མཁར་	Gonyid Wambur སྒོ་ཉིད་_ཝམ་བུར་	Yanglong
Tsenkhar སཙན་མཁར་	Domkhar Umling དོམ་མཁར་_ཨུམ་གླིང་	Domkhar
Tsenkhar སཙན་མཁར་	Domkhar Umling དོམ་མཁར་_ཨུམ་གླིང་	Dongling
Tsenkhar སཙན་མཁར་	Domkhar Umling དོམ་མཁར་_ཨུམ་གླིང་	Umling
Tsenkhar སཙན་མཁར་	Domkhar Umling དོམ་མཁར་_ཨུམ་གླིང་	Bangtsho
Tsenkhar སཙན་མཁར་	Dekaling Tshochhen བདེ་ཀ་གླིང་_མཚོ་ཆེན་	Barchhu
Tsenkhar སཙན་མཁར་	Dekaling Tshochhen བདེ་ཀ་གླིང་_མཚོ་ཆེན་	Changmadung
Tsenkhar སཙན་མཁར་	Dekaling Tshochhen བདེ་ཀ་གླིང་_མཚོ་ཆེན་	Chowa
Tsenkhar སཙན་མཁར་	Dekaling Tshochhen བདེ་ཀ་གླིང་_མཚོ་ཆེན་	Dekaling
Tsenkhar སཙན་མཁར་	Dekaling Tshochhen བདེ་ཀ་གླིང་_མཚོ་ཆེན་	Gamanang
Tsenkhar སཙན་མཁར་	Dekaling Tshochhen བདེ་ཀ་གླིང་_མཚོ་ཆེན་	Godong/Gordong
Tsenkhar སཙན་མཁར་	Dekaling Tshochhen བདེ་ཀ་གླིང་_མཚོ་ཆེན་	Kharphu
Tsenkhar སཙན་མཁར་	Dekaling Tshochhen བདེ་ཀ་གླིང་_མཚོ་ཆེན་	Ngathung
Tsenkhar སཙན་མཁར་	Dekaling Tshochhen བདེ་ཀ་གླིང་_མཚོ་ཆེན་	Phomed-doong
Tsenkhar སཙན་མཁར་	Dekaling Tshochhen བདེ་ཀ་གླིང་_མཚོ་ཆེན་	Phowantay
Tsenkhar སཙན་མཁར་	Dekaling Tshochhen བདེ་ཀ་གླིང་_མཚོ་ཆེན་	Phuntshochhoeling
Tsenkhar སཙན་མཁར་	Dekaling Tshochhen བདེ་ཀ་གླིང་_མཚོ་ཆེན་	Phurshongang
Tsenkhar སཙན་མཁར་	Dekaling Tshochhen བདེ་ཀ་གླིང་_མཚོ་ཆེན་	Sangphu
Tsenkhar སཙན་མཁར་	Dekaling Tshochhen བདེ་ཀ་གླིང་_མཚོ་ཆེན་	Sokchen
Tsenkhar སཙན་མཁར་	Dekaling Tshochhen བདེ་ཀ་གླིང་_མཚོ་ཆེན་	Takchu
Tsenkhar སཙན་མཁར་	Dekaling Tshochhen བདེ་ཀ་གླིང་_མཚོ་ཆེན་	Tashi Ling
Tsenkhar སཙན་མཁར་	Dekaling Tshochhen བདེ་ཀ་གླིང་_མཚོ་ཆེན་	Tongshi Lung
Tsenkhar སཙན་མཁར་	Dekaling Tshochhen བདེ་ཀ་གླིང་_མཚོ་ཆེན་	Tongsheling
Tsenkhar སཙན་མཁར་	Dekaling Tshochhen བདེ་ཀ་གླིང་_མཚོ་ཆེན་	Toekhar
Tsenkhar སཙན་མཁར་	Dekaling Tshochhen བདེ་ཀ་གླིང་_མཚོ་ཆེན་	Tshangphu
Tsenkhar སཙན་མཁར་	Dekaling Tshochhen བདེ་ཀ་གླིང་_མཚོ་ཆེན་	Tsochhen
Tsenkhar སཙན་མཁར་	Dekaling Tshochhen བདེ་ཀ་གླིང་_མཚོ་ཆེན་	Genchungla
Tsenkhar སཙན་མཁར་	Dekaling Tshochhen བདེ་ཀ་གླིང་_མཚོ་ཆེན་	Tsaenkhar
Tsenkhar སཙན་མཁར་	Dekaling Tshochhen བདེ་ཀ་གླིང་_མཚོ་ཆེན་	Tsholadrang
Tsenkhar སཙན་མཁར་	Autsho Chharbi ཨའུ་མཚོ་_འཆར་སྦིས་	Autho
Tsenkhar སཙན་མཁར་	Autsho Chharbi ཨའུ་མཚོ་_འཆར་སྦིས་	Chulung
Tsenkhar སཙན་མཁར་	Autsho Chharbi ཨའུ་མཚོ་_འཆར་སྦིས་	Chharbi
Tsenkhar སཙན་མཁར་	Autsho Chharbi ཨའུ་མཚོ་_འཆར་སྦིས་	Changchang Goenpa
Tsenkhar སཙན་མཁར་	Autsho Chharbi ཨའུ་མཚོ་_འཆར་སྦིས་	Dongthrom
Tsenkhar སཙན་མཁར་	Autsho Chharbi ཨའུ་མཚོ་_འཆར་སྦིས་	Kawachen
Tsenkhar སཙན་མཁར་	Autsho Chharbi ཨའུ་མཚོ་_འཆར་སྦིས་	Langabi
Tsenkhar སཙན་མཁར་	Autsho Chharbi ཨའུ་མཚོ་_འཆར་སྦིས་	Lawsa
Tsenkhar སཙན་མཁར་	Autsho Chharbi ཨའུ་མཚོ་_འཆར་སྦིས་	Peldraphu
Tsenkhar སཙན་མཁར་	Autsho Chharbi ཨའུ་མཚོ་_འཆར་སྦིས་	Shermachhu
Tsenkhar སཙན་མཁར་	Autsho Chharbi ཨའུ་མཚོ་_འཆར་སྦིས་	Shermachhu Goenpa
Tsenkhar སཙན་མཁར་	Autsho Chharbi ཨའུ་མཚོ་_འཆར་སྦིས་	Trangka Shing
Tsenkhar སཙན་མཁར་	Autsho Chharbi ཨའུ་མཚོ་_འཆར་སྦིས་	Tshochim
Tsenkhar སཙན་མཁར་	Autsho Chharbi ཨའུ་མཚོ་_འཆར་སྦིས་	Tongphugang
Tsenkhar སཙན་མཁར་	Artobadeb Guendrang ཨར་ཏོ་བ་སྡེབ་_དགུན་འབྲངས་	Guengdrang
Tsenkhar སཙན་མཁར་	Artobadeb Guendrang ཨར་ཏོ་བ་སྡེབ་_དགུན་འབྲངས་	Yangla
Tsenkhar སཙན་མཁར་	Artobadeb Guendrang ཨར་ཏོ་བ་སྡེབ་_དགུན་འབྲངས་	Artobadeb

=== Mongar District ===
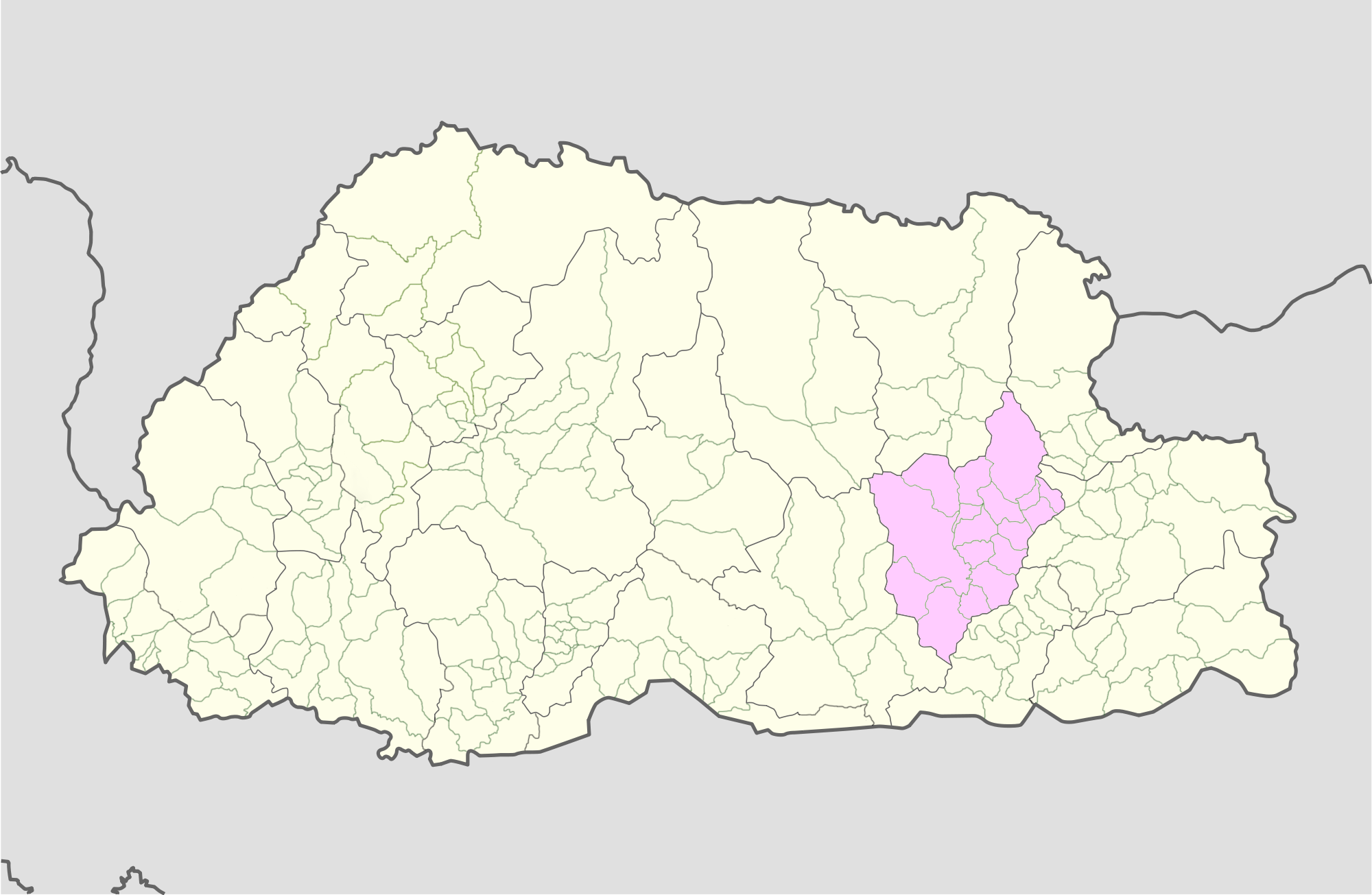
Mongar District

Gewog	Chiwog	Village
Balam བ་ལམ་	Khebishing མཁས་སྦི་ཤིང་	Khebishing
Balam བ་ལམ་	Balam Morphu བ་ལམ་_མོར་ཕུ་	Balam
Balam བ་ལམ་	Balam Morphu བ་ལམ་_མོར་ཕུ་	Sangjuzor
Balam བ་ལམ་	Bahkaphai བཱ་ཀ་ཕའི་	Bahkaphai
Balam བ་ལམ་	Doongmanma Selkhar དུང་མན་མ་_གསལ་མཁར་	Selkhar
Balam བ་ལམ་	Jadoong Yangbari བྱ་གདུང་_ཡངས་བ་རི་	Jadoong
Balam བ་ལམ་	Jadoong Yangbari བྱ་གདུང་_ཡངས་བ་རི་	Jadoong Goenpa
Balam བ་ལམ་	Jadoong Yangbari བྱ་གདུང་_ཡངས་བ་རི་	Jadoong Kha
Chaling ཅ་གླིང་	Chhaling Dopang ཆ་གླིང་_རྡོ་སྤང་	Chhaling
Chaling ཅ་གླིང་	Chhaling Dopang ཆ་གླིང་_རྡོ་སྤང་	Toepaphu
Chaling ཅ་གླིང་	Chhaling Dopang ཆ་གླིང་_རྡོ་སྤང་	Bana
Chaling ཅ་གླིང་	Chhaling Dopang ཆ་གླིང་_རྡོ་སྤང་	Bolipang
Chaling ཅ་གླིང་	Chhaling Dopang ཆ་གླིང་_རྡོ་སྤང་	Chaukileng
Chaling ཅ་གླིང་	Chhaling Dopang ཆ་གླིང་_རྡོ་སྤང་	Kharigab
Chaling ཅ་གླིང་	Chhaling Dopang ཆ་གླིང་_རྡོ་སྤང་	Kotshome
Chaling ཅ་གླིང་	Chhaling Dopang ཆ་གླིང་_རྡོ་སྤང་	Kurzam
Chaling ཅ་གླིང་	Chhaling Dopang ཆ་གླིང་_རྡོ་སྤང་	Lhakang
Chaling ཅ་གླིང་	Chhaling Dopang ཆ་གླིང་_རྡོ་སྤང་	Lhakang Bana
Chaling ཅ་གླིང་	Chhaling Dopang ཆ་གླིང་_རྡོ་སྤང་	Lhakang Dongbar
Chaling ཅ་གླིང་	Chhaling Dopang ཆ་གླིང་_རྡོ་སྤང་	Lhakang Goenshing
Chaling ཅ་གླིང་	Chhaling Dopang ཆ་གླིང་_རྡོ་སྤང་	Lhakang Khoyur
Chaling ཅ་གླིང་	Chhaling Dopang ཆ་གླིང་_རྡོ་སྤང་	Lhakang Unakhang
Chaling ཅ་གླིང་	Chhaling Dopang ཆ་གླིང་_རྡོ་སྤང་	Lhakang Lingchung
Chaling ཅ་གླིང་	Chhaling Dopang ཆ་གླིང་_རྡོ་སྤང་	Lhakang Pangjab
Chaling ཅ་གླིང་	Chhaling Dopang ཆ་གླིང་_རྡོ་སྤང་	Lhakang Ringseng
Chaling ཅ་གླིང་	Chhaling Dopang ཆ་གླིང་_རྡོ་སྤང་	Lhakang Ringseng
Chaling ཅ་གླིང་	Chhaling Dopang ཆ་གླིང་_རྡོ་སྤང་	Lhakang Sokpaling
Chaling ཅ་གླིང་	Chhaling Dopang ཆ་གླིང་_རྡོ་སྤང་	Lhakang Tengpa
Chaling ཅ་གླིང་	Chhaling Dopang ཆ་གླིང་_རྡོ་སྤང་	Namabi
Chaling ཅ་གླིང་	Chhaling Dopang ཆ་གླིང་_རྡོ་སྤང་	Nyerpa
Chaling ཅ་གླིང་	Chhaling Dopang ཆ་གླིང་_རྡོ་སྤང་	Salapho
Chaling ཅ་གླིང་	Chhaling Dopang ཆ་གླིང་_རྡོ་སྤང་	Shingkharzhong
Chaling ཅ་གླིང་	Chhaling Dopang ཆ་གླིང་_རྡོ་སྤང་	Sogpaling
Chaling ཅ་གླིང་	Chhaling Dopang ཆ་གླིང་_རྡོ་སྤང་	Tashipoktor
Chaling ཅ་གླིང་	Chhaling Dopang ཆ་གླིང་_རྡོ་སྤང་	Torzhonggor
Chaling ཅ་གླིང་	Chhaling Dopang ཆ་གླིང་_རྡོ་སྤང་	Wang
Chaling ཅ་གླིང་	Chhaling Dopang ཆ་གླིང་_རྡོ་སྤང་	Zanglawang
Chaling ཅ་གླིང་	Chhaling Dopang ཆ་གླིང་_རྡོ་སྤང་	Kharigab
Chaling ཅ་གླིང་	Chhaling Dopang ཆ་གླིང་_རྡོ་སྤང་	Pangjagpa
Chaling ཅ་གླིང་	Chhaling Dopang ཆ་གླིང་_རྡོ་སྤང་	Dopang
Chaling ཅ་གླིང་	Chulabi བཅུ་ལ་སྦི་	Bakhim
Chaling ཅ་གླིང་	Chulabi བཅུ་ལ་སྦི་	Bameijangsa
Chaling ཅ་གླིང་	Chulabi བཅུ་ལ་སྦི་	Chagsar
Chaling ཅ་གླིང་	Chulabi བཅུ་ལ་སྦི་	Chulabi
Chaling ཅ་གླིང་	Chulabi བཅུ་ལ་སྦི་	Kampasadong
Chaling ཅ་གླིང་	Chulabi བཅུ་ལ་སྦི་	Pangthang
Chaling ཅ་གླིང་	Chulabi བཅུ་ལ་སྦི་	Namling
Chaling ཅ་གླིང་	Chulabi བཅུ་ལ་སྦི་	Pogtor
Chaling ཅ་གླིང་	Chulabi བཅུ་ལ་སྦི་	Rolmochhu
Chaling ཅ་གླིང་	Chulabi བཅུ་ལ་སྦི་	Tagling
Chaling ཅ་གླིང་	Chulabi བཅུ་ལ་སྦི་	Aagshaling
Chaling ཅ་གླིང་	Chulabi བཅུ་ལ་སྦི་	Zhongje
Chaling ཅ་གླིང་	Chulabi བཅུ་ལ་སྦི་	Dongtoed
Chaling ཅ་གླིང་	Chulabi བཅུ་ལ་སྦི་	Dongtoed Bakhim
Chaling ཅ་གླིང་	Chulabi བཅུ་ལ་སྦི་	Dopang
Chaling ཅ་གླིང་	Chulabi བཅུ་ལ་སྦི་	Japang
Chaling ཅ་གླིང་	Chulabi བཅུ་ལ་སྦི་	Khachorshing
Chaling ཅ་གླིང་	Chulabi བཅུ་ལ་སྦི་	Khampaje
Chaling ཅ་གླིང་	Chulabi བཅུ་ལ་སྦི་	Kharduma
Chaling ཅ་གླིང་	Chulabi བཅུ་ལ་སྦི་	Khartong
Chaling ཅ་གླིང་	Chulabi བཅུ་ལ་སྦི་	Kirzhong
Chaling ཅ་གླིང་	Chulabi བཅུ་ལ་སྦི་	Masangkangjay
Chaling ཅ་གླིང་	Chulabi བཅུ་ལ་སྦི་	Numabiwang
Chaling ཅ་གླིང་	Chulabi བཅུ་ལ་སྦི་	Tshangkhar
Chaling ཅ་གླིང་	Chulabi བཅུ་ལ་སྦི་	Zhongkey
Chaling ཅ་གླིང་	Chulabi བཅུ་ལ་སྦི་	Tagling
Chaling ཅ་གླིང་	Shebchi Yangthang ཤེབ་ཅི་_ཡངས་ཐང་	Goensar
Chaling ཅ་གླིང་	Shebchi Yangthang ཤེབ་ཅི་_ཡངས་ཐང་	Gortongla
Chaling ཅ་གླིང་	Shebchi Yangthang ཤེབ་ཅི་_ཡངས་ཐང་	Budishing
Chaling ཅ་གླིང་	Shebchi Yangthang ཤེབ་ཅི་_ཡངས་ཐང་	Remochhu
Chaling ཅ་གླིང་	Shebchi Yangthang ཤེབ་ཅི་_ཡངས་ཐང་	Lungkang
Chaling ཅ་གླིང་	Shebchi Yangthang ཤེབ་ཅི་_ཡངས་ཐང་	Nagtshang
Chaling ཅ་གླིང་	Shebchi Yangthang ཤེབ་ཅི་_ཡངས་ཐང་	Nagtshangwog
Chaling ཅ་གླིང་	Shebchi Yangthang ཤེབ་ཅི་_ཡངས་ཐང་	Oangthang Chungku
Chaling ཅ་གླིང་	Shebchi Yangthang ཤེབ་ཅི་_ཡངས་ཐང་	Sapogtor
Chaling ཅ་གླིང་	Shebchi Yangthang ཤེབ་ཅི་_ཡངས་ཐང་	Shebchi
Chaling ཅ་གླིང་	Shebchi Yangthang ཤེབ་ཅི་_ཡངས་ཐང་	Thangthala
Chaling ཅ་གླིང་	Shebchi Yangthang ཤེབ་ཅི་_ཡངས་ཐང་	Yangthang
Chaling ཅ་གླིང་	Shebchi Yangthang ཤེབ་ཅི་_ཡངས་ཐང་	Yoezer Pangthang
Chaling ཅ་གླིང་	Pangthang Thempang སྤང་ཐང་_ཐེམ་སྤང་	Aidurla
Chaling ཅ་གླིང་	Pangthang Thempang སྤང་ཐང་_ཐེམ་སྤང་	Usdur
Chaling ཅ་གླིང་	Pangthang Thempang སྤང་ཐང་_ཐེམ་སྤང་	Tshamkhang
Chaling ཅ་གླིང་	Pangthang Thempang སྤང་ཐང་_ཐེམ་སྤང་	Charzhong
Chaling ཅ་གླིང་	Pangthang Thempang སྤང་ཐང་_ཐེམ་སྤང་	Domangla
Chaling ཅ་གླིང་	Pangthang Thempang སྤང་ཐང་_ཐེམ་སྤང་	Gorsum
Chaling ཅ་གླིང་	Pangthang Thempang སྤང་ཐང་_ཐེམ་སྤང་	Khoijongla
Chaling ཅ་གླིང་	Pangthang Thempang སྤང་ཐང་_ཐེམ་སྤང་	Khoilajong
Chaling ཅ་གླིང་	Pangthang Thempang སྤང་ཐང་_ཐེམ་སྤང་	Barigoila
Chaling ཅ་གླིང་	Pangthang Thempang སྤང་ཐང་_ཐེམ་སྤང་	Pangthang
Chaling ཅ་གླིང་	Pangthang Thempang སྤང་ཐང་_ཐེམ་སྤང་	Thempang
Chaling ཅ་གླིང་	Pangthang Thempang སྤང་ཐང་_ཐེམ་སྤང་	Tshokila
Chaling ཅ་གླིང་	Wangmakhar Khalangji ཝང་མ་མཁར་_ཁ་ལང་སྦྱིས་	Jambi
Chaling ཅ་གླིང་	Wangmakhar Khalangji ཝང་མ་མཁར་_ཁ་ལང་སྦྱིས་	Barleng
Chaling ཅ་གླིང་	Wangmakhar Khalangji ཝང་མ་མཁར་_ཁ་ལང་སྦྱིས་	Bewling
Chaling ཅ་གླིང་	Wangmakhar Khalangji ཝང་མ་མཁར་_ཁ་ལང་སྦྱིས་	Chawasing
Chaling ཅ་གླིང་	Wangmakhar Khalangji ཝང་མ་མཁར་_ཁ་ལང་སྦྱིས་	Chewang
Chaling ཅ་གླིང་	Wangmakhar Khalangji ཝང་མ་མཁར་_ཁ་ལང་སྦྱིས་	Damaling
Chaling ཅ་གླིང་	Wangmakhar Khalangji ཝང་མ་མཁར་_ཁ་ལང་སྦྱིས་	Darseng
Chaling ཅ་གླིང་	Wangmakhar Khalangji ཝང་མ་མཁར་_ཁ་ལང་སྦྱིས་	Nordangsa
Chaling ཅ་གླིང་	Wangmakhar Khalangji ཝང་མ་མཁར་_ཁ་ལང་སྦྱིས་	Pangthang Shokposeng
Chaling ཅ་གླིང་	Wangmakhar Khalangji ཝང་མ་མཁར་_ཁ་ལང་སྦྱིས་	Pemagayser
Chaling ཅ་གླིང་	Wangmakhar Khalangji ཝང་མ་མཁར་_ཁ་ལང་སྦྱིས་	Phodagnma
Chaling ཅ་གླིང་	Wangmakhar Khalangji ཝང་མ་མཁར་_ཁ་ལང་སྦྱིས་	Phumazur
Chaling ཅ་གླིང་	Wangmakhar Khalangji ཝང་མ་མཁར་_ཁ་ལང་སྦྱིས་	Rahambi
Chaling ཅ་གླིང་	Wangmakhar Khalangji ཝང་མ་མཁར་_ཁ་ལང་སྦྱིས་	Shogoseng
Chaling ཅ་གླིང་	Wangmakhar Khalangji ཝང་མ་མཁར་_ཁ་ལང་སྦྱིས་	Tikusalung
Chaling ཅ་གླིང་	Wangmakhar Khalangji ཝང་མ་མཁར་_ཁ་ལང་སྦྱིས་	Wangkhar
Chaling ཅ་གླིང་	Wangmakhar Khalangji ཝང་མ་མཁར་_ཁ་ལང་སྦྱིས་	Kadam
Chaling ཅ་གླིང་	Wangmakhar Khalangji ཝང་མ་མཁར་_ཁ་ལང་སྦྱིས་	Balingbi
Chaling ཅ་གླིང་	Wangmakhar Khalangji ཝང་མ་མཁར་_ཁ་ལང་སྦྱིས་	Changmashing
Chaling ཅ་གླིང་	Wangmakhar Khalangji ཝང་མ་མཁར་_ཁ་ལང་སྦྱིས་	Dokorbang
Chaling ཅ་གླིང་	Wangmakhar Khalangji ཝང་མ་མཁར་_ཁ་ལང་སྦྱིས་	Dogtang
Chaling ཅ་གླིང་	Wangmakhar Khalangji ཝང་མ་མཁར་_ཁ་ལང་སྦྱིས་	Dongjug
Chaling ཅ་གླིང་	Wangmakhar Khalangji ཝང་མ་མཁར་_ཁ་ལང་སྦྱིས་	Gensing
Chaling ཅ་གླིང་	Wangmakhar Khalangji ཝང་མ་མཁར་_ཁ་ལང་སྦྱིས་	Kamsa
Chaling ཅ་གླིང་	Wangmakhar Khalangji ཝང་མ་མཁར་_ཁ་ལང་སྦྱིས་	Kawakhoi
Chaling ཅ་གླིང་	Wangmakhar Khalangji ཝང་མ་མཁར་_ཁ་ལང་སྦྱིས་	Khemsang
Chaling ཅ་གླིང་	Wangmakhar Khalangji ཝང་མ་མཁར་_ཁ་ལང་སྦྱིས་	Mentshang
Chaling ཅ་གླིང་	Wangmakhar Khalangji ཝང་མ་མཁར་_ཁ་ལང་སྦྱིས་	Namathang
Chaling ཅ་གླིང་	Wangmakhar Khalangji ཝང་མ་མཁར་_ཁ་ལང་སྦྱིས་	Pangthang
Chaling ཅ་གླིང་	Wangmakhar Khalangji ཝང་མ་མཁར་_ཁ་ལང་སྦྱིས་	Phachaphogchi
Chaling ཅ་གླིང་	Wangmakhar Khalangji ཝང་མ་མཁར་_ཁ་ལང་སྦྱིས་	Pangshing
Chaling ཅ་གླིང་	Wangmakhar Khalangji ཝང་མ་མཁར་_ཁ་ལང་སྦྱིས་	Sumthuen
Chaling ཅ་གླིང་	Wangmakhar Khalangji ཝང་མ་མཁར་_ཁ་ལང་སྦྱིས་	Tadzong
Chaling ཅ་གླིང་	Wangmakhar Khalangji ཝང་མ་མཁར་_ཁ་ལང་སྦྱིས་	Trashikhangsar
Chaling ཅ་གླིང་	Wangmakhar Khalangji ཝང་མ་མཁར་_ཁ་ལང་སྦྱིས་	Tshepadong
Chaling ཅ་གླིང་	Wangmakhar Khalangji ཝང་མ་མཁར་_ཁ་ལང་སྦྱིས་	Yoekhoi
Chaling ཅ་གླིང་	Wangmakhar Khalangji ཝང་མ་མཁར་_ཁ་ལང་སྦྱིས་	Yontenkhem
Chaling ཅ་གླིང་	Wangmakhar Khalangji ཝང་མ་མཁར་_ཁ་ལང་སྦྱིས་	Zhongje
Chaling ཅ་གླིང་	Wangmakhar Khalangji ཝང་མ་མཁར་_ཁ་ལང་སྦྱིས་	Zinthuen
Chaling ཅ་གླིང་	Wangmakhar Khalangji ཝང་མ་མཁར་_ཁ་ལང་སྦྱིས་	Jachuling
Chaling ཅ་གླིང་	Wangmakhar Khalangji ཝང་མ་མཁར་_ཁ་ལང་སྦྱིས་	Yoekhoi
Chaskhar ལྕགས་ས་མཁར་	Yangrapoongshing གཡང་ར་སྤུང་ཤིང་	Yangrapoongshing
Chaskhar ལྕགས་ས་མཁར་	Kharnang Kheshingra མཁར་ནང་_ཁེ་ཤིང་ར་	Khamang
Chaskhar ལྕགས་ས་མཁར་	Doongsingma Pam དུང་སིང་མ་_སྤམ་	Doongshingma
Chaskhar ལྕགས་ས་མཁར་	Doongsingma Pam དུང་སིང་མ་_སྤམ་	Pam
Chaskhar ལྕགས་ས་མཁར་	Borphai Chagsakhar སྦོར་པའི་_ལྕགས་ས་མཁར་	Chagsakhar
Chaskhar ལྕགས་ས་མཁར་	Yetong Jarshingpogtor ཡེ་སྟོང་_བྱར་ཤིང་སྤོག་ཏོར་	Yetong
Drametse དགྲ་མེད་རྩེ་	Serkhagphoog Yengkhartshing གསེར་ཁག་ཕུག་_ཡེངས་ཁར་ཚིང་	Bazor
Drametse དགྲ་མེད་རྩེ་	Serkhagphoog Yengkhartshing གསེར་ཁག་ཕུག་_ཡེངས་ཁར་ཚིང་	Laymey
Drametse དགྲ་མེད་རྩེ་	Serkhagphoog Yengkhartshing གསེར་ཁག་ཕུག་_ཡེངས་ཁར་ཚིང་	Laymey Serkhagphoog
Drametse དགྲ་མེད་རྩེ་	Serkhagphoog Yengkhartshing གསེར་ཁག་ཕུག་_ཡེངས་ཁར་ཚིང་	Serkhaphug
Drametse དགྲ་མེད་རྩེ་	Serkhagphoog Yengkhartshing གསེར་ཁག་ཕུག་_ཡེངས་ཁར་ཚིང་	Yengkhartshing
Drametse དགྲ་མེད་རྩེ་	Dramedtse Shaphangma དགྲ་མེད་རྩེ་_ཤ་ཕང་མ་	Dramdetse
Drametse དགྲ་མེད་རྩེ་	Dramedtse Shaphangma དགྲ་མེད་རྩེ་_ཤ་ཕང་མ་	Shaphangma
Drametse དགྲ་མེད་རྩེ་	Dramedtse Shaphangma དགྲ་མེད་རྩེ་_ཤ་ཕང་མ་	Ongkhar
Drametse དགྲ་མེད་རྩེ་	Dramedtse Shaphangma དགྲ་མེད་རྩེ་_ཤ་ཕང་མ་	Jiwa
Drametse དགྲ་མེད་རྩེ་	Dramedtse Shaphangma དགྲ་མེད་རྩེ་_ཤ་ཕང་མ་	Luwang
Drametse དགྲ་མེད་རྩེ་	Dramedtse Shaphangma དགྲ་མེད་རྩེ་_ཤ་ཕང་མ་	Ngarphai
Drametse དགྲ་མེད་རྩེ་	Dramedtse Shaphangma དགྲ་མེད་རྩེ་_ཤ་ཕང་མ་	Phentshomo
Drametse དགྲ་མེད་རྩེ་	Dramedtse Shaphangma དགྲ་མེད་རྩེ་_ཤ་ཕང་མ་	Ngarphel
Drametse དགྲ་མེད་རྩེ་	Baging Shadang སྦ་གིང་_ཤ་གདངས་	Shadang
Drametse དགྲ་མེད་རྩེ་	Baging Shadang སྦ་གིང་_ཤ་གདངས་	Gashari
Drametse དགྲ་མེད་རྩེ་	Zangkhar ཟངས་མཁར་	Zangkhar
Drametse དགྲ་མེད་རྩེ་	Zangkhar ཟངས་མཁར་	Gobka
Drametse དགྲ་མེད་རྩེ་	Bikhar Thoongdari སྦི་མཁར་_ཐུང་ད་རི་	Bikhar
Drametse དགྲ་མེད་རྩེ་	Bikhar Thoongdari སྦི་མཁར་_ཐུང་ད་རི་	Thramlo
Drametse དགྲ་མེད་རྩེ་	Bikhar Thoongdari སྦི་མཁར་_ཐུང་ད་རི་	Thoongdabi
Drametse དགྲ་མེད་རྩེ་	Bikhar Thoongdari སྦི་མཁར་_ཐུང་ད་རི་	Thoongdari
Drametse དགྲ་མེད་རྩེ་	Bikhar Thoongdari སྦི་མཁར་_ཐུང་ད་རི་	Waichur
Drametse དགྲ་མེད་རྩེ་	Bikhar Thoongdari སྦི་མཁར་_ཐུང་ད་རི་	Yalum
Drepong འབྲེས་སྤུངས་	Boompazor Drepoong བུམ་པ་ཟོར་_འབྲེས་སྤུངས་	Drepoong
Drepong འབྲེས་སྤུངས་	Labtsa Shinggar ལབ་རྩ་_ཤིང་སྒར་	Labtsa Ka
Drepong འབྲེས་སྤུངས་	Bainangri Nyamla སྦའི་ནང་རི་_ཉམས་ལ་	Labtsa Kha
Drepong འབྲེས་སྤུངས་	Chhagsuzor Tsangkhar ཕྱགས་སུ་ཟོར་_གཙང་མཁར་	Chhagsuzor
Drepong འབྲེས་སྤུངས་	Chhagsuzor Tsangkhar ཕྱགས་སུ་ཟོར་_གཙང་མཁར་	Tsangkhar
Drepong འབྲེས་སྤུངས་	Zunglen བཟུང་ལེན་	Zunglen
Gongdue དགོངས་འདུས་	Damkhar Weringla སྡམ་མཁར་_ཝེ་རིང་ལ་	Damkhar
Gongdue དགོངས་འདུས་	Damkhar Weringla སྡམ་མཁར་_ཝེ་རིང་ལ་	Dogmo
Gongdue དགོངས་འདུས་	Damkhar Weringla སྡམ་མཁར་_ཝེ་རིང་ལ་	Gorgdey
Gongdue དགོངས་འདུས་	Damkhar Weringla སྡམ་མཁར་_ཝེ་རིང་ལ་	Pangthang
Gongdue དགོངས་འདུས་	Damkhar Weringla སྡམ་མཁར་_ཝེ་རིང་ལ་	Phosala
Gongdue དགོངས་འདུས་	Damkhar Weringla སྡམ་མཁར་_ཝེ་རིང་ལ་	Salibi
Gongdue དགོངས་འདུས་	Damkhar Weringla སྡམ་མཁར་_ཝེ་རིང་ལ་	Salibi Dungda
Gongdue དགོངས་འདུས་	Damkhar Weringla སྡམ་མཁར་_ཝེ་རིང་ལ་	Toedkar
Gongdue དགོངས་འདུས་	Damkhar Weringla སྡམ་མཁར་_ཝེ་རིང་ལ་	Tshabor
Gongdue དགོངས་འདུས་	Damkhar Weringla སྡམ་མཁར་_ཝེ་རིང་ལ་	Weringla
Gongdue དགོངས་འདུས་	Phadzong ཕ་རྫོང་	Bangbangla
Gongdue དགོངས་འདུས་	Phadzong ཕ་རྫོང་	Chaibi
Gongdue དགོངས་འདུས་	Phadzong ཕ་རྫོང་	Dekhar
Gongdue དགོངས་འདུས་	Phadzong ཕ་རྫོང་	Dewabi
Gongdue དགོངས་འདུས་	Phadzong ཕ་རྫོང་	Gorthongla
Gongdue དགོངས་འདུས་	Phadzong ཕ་རྫོང་	Mantshang
Gongdue དགོངས་འདུས་	Phadzong ཕ་རྫོང་	Miden
Gongdue དགོངས་འདུས་	Phadzong ཕ་རྫོང་	Phadzong
Gongdue དགོངས་འདུས་	Daagsa Kumadzong བདག་ས་_སྐུ་མ་རྫོང་	Bogarbi
Gongdue དགོངས་འདུས་	Daagsa Kumadzong བདག་ས་_སྐུ་མ་རྫོང་	Daagsa
Gongdue དགོངས་འདུས་	Daagsa Kumadzong བདག་ས་_སྐུ་མ་རྫོང་	Goenpa
Gongdue དགོངས་འདུས་	Daagsa Kumadzong བདག་ས་_སྐུ་མ་རྫོང་	Gungdue
Gongdue དགོངས་འདུས་	Daagsa Kumadzong བདག་ས་_སྐུ་མ་རྫོང་	Kumadzong
Gongdue དགོངས་འདུས་	Daagsa Kumadzong བདག་ས་_སྐུ་མ་རྫོང་	Labtsa
Gongdue དགོངས་འདུས་	Daagsa Kumadzong བདག་ས་_སྐུ་མ་རྫོང་	Phuchung Goenpa
Gongdue དགོངས་འདུས་	Daagsa Kumadzong བདག་ས་_སྐུ་མ་རྫོང་	Tshambali
Gongdue དགོངས་འདུས་	Pikari Yangbari སྤི་ཀ་རི་_ཡངས་སྦ་རི་	Kormaed
Gongdue དགོངས་འདུས་	Pikari Yangbari སྤི་ཀ་རི་_ཡངས་སྦ་རི་	Pangtong
Gongdue དགོངས་འདུས་	Pikari Yangbari སྤི་ཀ་རི་_ཡངས་སྦ་རི་	Pikari
Gongdue དགོངས་འདུས་	Pikari Yangbari སྤི་ཀ་རི་_ཡངས་སྦ་རི་	Yangbari
Gongdue དགོངས་འདུས་	Baagla Dengkaling སྦག་ལ་_སྡེང་ཀ་གླིང་	Baagla Edi
Gongdue དགོངས་འདུས་	Baagla Dengkaling སྦག་ལ་_སྡེང་ཀ་གླིང་	Baagla
Gongdue དགོངས་འདུས་	Baagla Dengkaling སྦག་ལ་_སྡེང་ཀ་གླིང་	Baagla Goenpa
Gongdue དགོངས་འདུས་	Baagla Dengkaling སྦག་ལ་_སྡེང་ཀ་གླིང་	Baagla Khimong
Gongdue དགོངས་འདུས་	Baagla Dengkaling སྦག་ལ་_སྡེང་ཀ་གླིང་	Dengkaling
Jurmey འགྱུར་མེད་	Ngamphoog Sangkama ངམ་ཕུག་_སང་ཀ་མ་	Ngamphoog
Jurmey འགྱུར་མེད་	Ngamphoog Sangkama ངམ་ཕུག་_སང་ཀ་མ་	Sangkama
Jurmey འགྱུར་མེད་	Bilam Dangkila སྦིས་ལམ་_དངས་ཀྱི་ལ་	Bilam
Jurmey འགྱུར་མེད་	Bilam Dangkila སྦིས་ལམ་_དངས་ཀྱི་ལ་	Aring Daza
Jurmey འགྱུར་མེད་	Bilam Dangkila སྦིས་ལམ་_དངས་ཀྱི་ལ་	Dangkila
Jurmey འགྱུར་མེད་	Bilam Dangkila སྦིས་ལམ་_དངས་ཀྱི་ལ་	Dumdey
Jurmey འགྱུར་མེད་	Bilam Dangkila སྦིས་ལམ་_དངས་ཀྱི་ལ་	Gongtshang
Jurmey འགྱུར་མེད་	Bilam Dangkila སྦིས་ལམ་_དངས་ཀྱི་ལ་	Korkhang
Jurmey འགྱུར་མེད་	Bilam Dangkila སྦིས་ལམ་_དངས་ཀྱི་ལ་	Maphai
Jurmey འགྱུར་མེད་	Bilam Dangkila སྦིས་ལམ་_དངས་ཀྱི་ལ་	Menchaphoog
Jurmey འགྱུར་མེད་	Bilam Dangkila སྦིས་ལམ་_དངས་ཀྱི་ལ་	Moodoongbi
Jurmey འགྱུར་མེད་	Bilam Dangkila སྦིས་ལམ་_དངས་ཀྱི་ལ་	Pegpela
Jurmey འགྱུར་མེད་	Bilam Dangkila སྦིས་ལམ་_དངས་ཀྱི་ལ་	Ngangri
Jurmey འགྱུར་མེད་	Bilam Dangkila སྦིས་ལམ་_དངས་ཀྱི་ལ་	Shingmung
Jurmey འགྱུར་མེད་	Bilam Dangkila སྦིས་ལམ་_དངས་ཀྱི་ལ་	Bacha
Jurmey འགྱུར་མེད་	Bilam Dangkila སྦིས་ལམ་_དངས་ཀྱི་ལ་	Chenchari
Jurmey འགྱུར་མེད་	Bilam Dangkila སྦིས་ལམ་_དངས་ཀྱི་ལ་	Daroong
Jurmey འགྱུར་མེད་	Bilam Dangkila སྦིས་ལམ་_དངས་ཀྱི་ལ་	Kaikhar
Jurmey འགྱུར་མེད་	Bilam Dangkila སྦིས་ལམ་_དངས་ཀྱི་ལ་	Khemtagpa
Jurmey འགྱུར་མེད་	Bilam Dangkila སྦིས་ལམ་_དངས་ཀྱི་ལ་	Maniling
Jurmey འགྱུར་མེད་	Bilam Dangkila སྦིས་ལམ་_དངས་ཀྱི་ལ་	Pangkang
Jurmey འགྱུར་མེད་	Bilam Dangkila སྦིས་ལམ་_དངས་ཀྱི་ལ་	Shingsiri
Jurmey འགྱུར་མེད་	Moogtangkhar Tsangkhazor མུག་བསྟང་མཁར་_བཙང་ཁ་ཟོར་	Moogtangkhar
Jurmey འགྱུར་མེད་	Moogtangkhar Tsangkhazor མུག་བསྟང་མཁར་_བཙང་ཁ་ཟོར་	Awatang
Jurmey འགྱུར་མེད་	Moogtangkhar Tsangkhazor མུག་བསྟང་མཁར་_བཙང་ཁ་ཟོར་	Bacha
Jurmey འགྱུར་མེད་	Moogtangkhar Tsangkhazor མུག་བསྟང་མཁར་_བཙང་ཁ་ཟོར་	Barpoong
Jurmey འགྱུར་མེད་	Moogtangkhar Tsangkhazor མུག་བསྟང་མཁར་_བཙང་ཁ་ཟོར་	Doongmein
Jurmey འགྱུར་མེད་	Moogtangkhar Tsangkhazor མུག་བསྟང་མཁར་_བཙང་ཁ་ཟོར་	Gamong
Jurmey འགྱུར་མེད་	Moogtangkhar Tsangkhazor མུག་བསྟང་མཁར་_བཙང་ཁ་ཟོར་	Ganggarthang
Jurmey འགྱུར་མེད་	Moogtangkhar Tsangkhazor མུག་བསྟང་མཁར་_བཙང་ཁ་ཟོར་	Gomtshanglo
Jurmey འགྱུར་མེད་	Moogtangkhar Tsangkhazor མུག་བསྟང་མཁར་_བཙང་ཁ་ཟོར་	Kangloong
Jurmey འགྱུར་མེད་	Moogtangkhar Tsangkhazor མུག་བསྟང་མཁར་_བཙང་ཁ་ཟོར་	Langabi
Jurmey འགྱུར་མེད་	Moogtangkhar Tsangkhazor མུག་བསྟང་མཁར་_བཙང་ཁ་ཟོར་	Orkawang
Jurmey འགྱུར་མེད་	Moogtangkhar Tsangkhazor མུག་བསྟང་མཁར་_བཙང་ཁ་ཟོར་	Pangthang
Jurmey འགྱུར་མེད་	Moogtangkhar Tsangkhazor མུག་བསྟང་མཁར་_བཙང་ཁ་ཟོར་	Phaichhelo
Jurmey འགྱུར་མེད་	Moogtangkhar Tsangkhazor མུག་བསྟང་མཁར་_བཙང་ཁ་ཟོར་	Ringphu
Jurmey འགྱུར་མེད་	Moogtangkhar Tsangkhazor མུག་བསྟང་མཁར་_བཙང་ཁ་ཟོར་	Ringphujab
Jurmey འགྱུར་མེད་	Moogtangkhar Tsangkhazor མུག་བསྟང་མཁར་_བཙང་ཁ་ཟོར་	Rewang
Jurmey འགྱུར་མེད་	Moogtangkhar Tsangkhazor མུག་བསྟང་མཁར་_བཙང་ཁ་ཟོར་	Singyephu
Jurmey འགྱུར་མེད་	Moogtangkhar Tsangkhazor མུག་བསྟང་མཁར་_བཙང་ཁ་ཟོར་	Thongpashing
Jurmey འགྱུར་མེད་	Moogtangkhar Tsangkhazor མུག་བསྟང་མཁར་_བཙང་ཁ་ཟོར་	Tselam/Kamling
Jurmey འགྱུར་མེད་	Moogtangkhar Tsangkhazor མུག་བསྟང་མཁར་_བཙང་ཁ་ཟོར་	Roinangwoong
Jurmey འགྱུར་མེད་	Moogtangkhar Tsangkhazor མུག་བསྟང་མཁར་_བཙང་ཁ་ཟོར་	Kurtakay
Jurmey འགྱུར་མེད་	Moogtangkhar Tsangkhazor མུག་བསྟང་མཁར་_བཙང་ཁ་ཟོར་	Luzor
Jurmey འགྱུར་མེད་	Moogtangkhar Tsangkhazor མུག་བསྟང་མཁར་_བཙང་ཁ་ཟོར་	Maentsang
Jurmey འགྱུར་མེད་	Moogtangkhar Tsangkhazor མུག་བསྟང་མཁར་_བཙང་ཁ་ཟོར་	Phentokma
Jurmey འགྱུར་མེད་	Moogtangkhar Tsangkhazor མུག་བསྟང་མཁར་_བཙང་ཁ་ཟོར་	Poongla
Jurmey འགྱུར་མེད་	Moogtangkhar Tsangkhazor མུག་བསྟང་མཁར་_བཙང་ཁ་ཟོར་	Tsangkhazor
Jurmey འགྱུར་མེད་	Moogtangkhar Tsangkhazor མུག་བསྟང་མཁར་_བཙང་ཁ་ཟོར་	Wodang
Jurmey འགྱུར་མེད་	Moodoongkhar Tselam མུ་དུང་མཁར་_རྩེ་ལམ་	Tselam
Jurmey འགྱུར་མེད་	Moodoongkhar Tselam མུ་དུང་མཁར་_རྩེ་ལམ་	Bumnali
Jurmey འགྱུར་མེད་	Moodoongkhar Tselam མུ་དུང་མཁར་_རྩེ་ལམ་	Chagpa
Jurmey འགྱུར་མེད་	Moodoongkhar Tselam མུ་དུང་མཁར་_རྩེ་ལམ་	Dekilam
Jurmey འགྱུར་མེད་	Moodoongkhar Tselam མུ་དུང་མཁར་_རྩེ་ལམ་	Karmaling
Jurmey འགྱུར་མེད་	Moodoongkhar Tselam མུ་དུང་མཁར་_རྩེ་ལམ་	Korphu
Jurmey འགྱུར་མེད་	Moodoongkhar Tselam མུ་དུང་མཁར་_རྩེ་ལམ་	Moodoongkhar
Jurmey འགྱུར་མེད་	Moodoongkhar Tselam མུ་དུང་མཁར་_རྩེ་ལམ་	Rimpako
Jurmey འགྱུར་མེད་	Moodoongkhar Tselam མུ་དུང་མཁར་_རྩེ་ལམ་	Samkhar
Jurmey འགྱུར་མེད་	Moodoongkhar Tselam མུ་དུང་མཁར་_རྩེ་ལམ་	Doongkar
Jurmey འགྱུར་མེད་	Moodoongkhar Tselam མུ་དུང་མཁར་_རྩེ་ལམ་	Barlamtoed
Jurmey འགྱུར་མེད་	Moodoongkhar Tselam མུ་དུང་མཁར་_རྩེ་ལམ་	Baydengyer
Jurmey འགྱུར་མེད་	Moodoongkhar Tselam མུ་དུང་མཁར་_རྩེ་ལམ་	Dori
Jurmey འགྱུར་མེད་	Moodoongkhar Tselam མུ་དུང་མཁར་_རྩེ་ལམ་	Gaykhar
Jurmey འགྱུར་མེད་	Moodoongkhar Tselam མུ་དུང་མཁར་_རྩེ་ལམ་	Pangthang
Jurmey འགྱུར་མེད་	Moodoongkhar Tselam མུ་དུང་མཁར་_རྩེ་ལམ་	Tashi Tshering
Jurmey འགྱུར་མེད་	Moodoongkhar Tselam མུ་དུང་མཁར་_རྩེ་ལམ་	Tselam
Jurmey འགྱུར་མེད་	Moodoongkhar Tselam མུ་དུང་མཁར་_རྩེ་ལམ་	Tooloogpe
Jurmey འགྱུར་མེད་	Kognala Yaragla སྐོག་ན་ལ་_ཡ་རག་ལ་	Kognala
Jurmey འགྱུར་མེད་	Kognala Yaragla སྐོག་ན་ལ་_ཡ་རག་ལ་	Ya-Ragkla
Kengkhar སྐྱེངས་མཁར་	Tongla Zitsibi སྟོང་ལ་_གཟི་རྩི་སྦིས་	Tongkangla
Kengkhar སྐྱེངས་མཁར་	Tongla Zitsibi སྟོང་ལ་_གཟི་རྩི་སྦིས་	Tongkangla/Sungkar
Kengkhar སྐྱེངས་མཁར་	Tongla Zitsibi སྟོང་ལ་_གཟི་རྩི་སྦིས་	Tongkangla/Zitsibi
Kengkhar སྐྱེངས་མཁར་	Tongla Zitsibi སྟོང་ལ་_གཟི་རྩི་སྦིས་	Tongla
Kengkhar སྐྱེངས་མཁར་	Tongla Zitsibi སྟོང་ལ་_གཟི་རྩི་སྦིས་	Bargoenpa
Kengkhar སྐྱེངས་མཁར་	Tongla Zitsibi སྟོང་ལ་_གཟི་རྩི་སྦིས་	Goenpa
Kengkhar སྐྱེངས་མཁར་	Tongla Zitsibi སྟོང་ལ་_གཟི་རྩི་སྦིས་	Shajula
Kengkhar སྐྱེངས་མཁར་	Tongla Zitsibi སྟོང་ལ་_གཟི་རྩི་སྦིས་	Tongla Goenpa
Kengkhar སྐྱེངས་མཁར་	Tongla Zitsibi སྟོང་ལ་_གཟི་རྩི་སྦིས་	Tongla Mangzing
Kengkhar སྐྱེངས་མཁར་	Dogtang Mooroong དོག་སྟང་_མུ་རུང་	Dogtang
Kengkhar སྐྱེངས་མཁར་	Dogtang Mooroong དོག་སྟང་_མུ་རུང་	Korshingngari
Kengkhar སྐྱེངས་མཁར་	Dogtang Mooroong དོག་སྟང་_མུ་རུང་	Pangthang
Kengkhar སྐྱེངས་མཁར་	Dogtang Mooroong དོག་སྟང་_མུ་རུང་	Putshume
Kengkhar སྐྱེངས་མཁར་	Dogtang Mooroong དོག་སྟང་_མུ་རུང་	Telpo
Kengkhar སྐྱེངས་མཁར་	Dogtang Mooroong དོག་སྟང་_མུ་རུང་	Tshangnari
Kengkhar སྐྱེངས་མཁར་	Dogtang Mooroong དོག་སྟང་_མུ་རུང་	Zorthoong
Kengkhar སྐྱེངས་མཁར་	Dogtang Mooroong དོག་སྟང་_མུ་རུང་	Mooroong
Kengkhar སྐྱེངས་མཁར་	Dogtang Mooroong དོག་སྟང་_མུ་རུང་	Deng
Kengkhar སྐྱེངས་མཁར་	Dogtang Mooroong དོག་སྟང་_མུ་རུང་	Romangla
Kengkhar སྐྱེངས་མཁར་	Dogtang Mooroong དོག་སྟང་_མུ་རུང་	Soichari
Kengkhar སྐྱེངས་མཁར་	Kyidpari Yuldarig སྐྱིད་པ་རི་_ཡུལ་ད་རིགས་	Pogla
Kengkhar སྐྱེངས་མཁར་	Kyidpari Yuldarig སྐྱིད་པ་རི་_ཡུལ་ད་རིགས་	Amdaybu
Kengkhar སྐྱེངས་མཁར་	Kyidpari Yuldarig སྐྱིད་པ་རི་_ཡུལ་ད་རིགས་	Dochiru
Kengkhar སྐྱེངས་མཁར་	Kyidpari Yuldarig སྐྱིད་པ་རི་_ཡུལ་ད་རིགས་	Dochhuru
Kengkhar སྐྱེངས་མཁར་	Kyidpari Yuldarig སྐྱིད་པ་རི་_ཡུལ་ད་རིགས་	Kyidpari
Kengkhar སྐྱེངས་མཁར་	Kyidpari Yuldarig སྐྱིད་པ་རི་_ཡུལ་ད་རིགས་	Nugphu
Kengkhar སྐྱེངས་མཁར་	Kyidpari Yuldarig སྐྱིད་པ་རི་_ཡུལ་ད་རིགས་	Yuldagri
Kengkhar སྐྱེངས་མཁར་	Kyidpari Yuldarig སྐྱིད་པ་རི་_ཡུལ་ད་རིགས་	Ghishinghung
Kengkhar སྐྱེངས་མཁར་	Kyidpari Yuldarig སྐྱིད་པ་རི་_ཡུལ་ད་རིགས་	Kamngeysa
Kengkhar སྐྱེངས་མཁར་	Neykolog Warongborang གནས་ཀོ་ལོག་_ཝ་རོང་བོ་རང་	Chiphu
Kengkhar སྐྱེངས་མཁར་	Neykolog Warongborang གནས་ཀོ་ལོག་_ཝ་རོང་བོ་རང་	Bargoenpa
Kengkhar སྐྱེངས་མཁར་	Neykolog Warongborang གནས་ཀོ་ལོག་_ཝ་རོང་བོ་རང་	Draphu
Kengkhar སྐྱེངས་མཁར་	Neykolog Warongborang གནས་ཀོ་ལོག་_ཝ་རོང་བོ་རང་	Tshowang
Kengkhar སྐྱེངས་མཁར་	Neykolog Warongborang གནས་ཀོ་ལོག་_ཝ་རོང་བོ་རང་	Tshowangri
Kengkhar སྐྱེངས་མཁར་	Neykolog Warongborang གནས་ཀོ་ལོག་_ཝ་རོང་བོ་རང་	Neykolog
Kengkhar སྐྱེངས་མཁར་	Neykolog Warongborang གནས་ཀོ་ལོག་_ཝ་རོང་བོ་རང་	Bainang
Kengkhar སྐྱེངས་མཁར་	Neykolog Warongborang གནས་ཀོ་ལོག་_ཝ་རོང་བོ་རང་	Amshing Wog
Kengkhar སྐྱེངས་མཁར་	Neykolog Warongborang གནས་ཀོ་ལོག་_ཝ་རོང་བོ་རང་	Barzor
Kengkhar སྐྱེངས་མཁར་	Neykolog Warongborang གནས་ཀོ་ལོག་_ཝ་རོང་བོ་རང་	Dogsabi
Kengkhar སྐྱེངས་མཁར་	Neykolog Warongborang གནས་ཀོ་ལོག་_ཝ་རོང་བོ་རང་	Dogtshong Nadang
Kengkhar སྐྱེངས་མཁར་	Neykolog Warongborang གནས་ཀོ་ལོག་_ཝ་རོང་བོ་རང་	Gabcha
Kengkhar སྐྱེངས་མཁར་	Neykolog Warongborang གནས་ཀོ་ལོག་_ཝ་རོང་བོ་རང་	Genchaphu
Kengkhar སྐྱེངས་མཁར་	Neykolog Warongborang གནས་ཀོ་ལོག་_ཝ་རོང་བོ་རང་	Gomchhu
Kengkhar སྐྱེངས་མཁར་	Neykolog Warongborang གནས་ཀོ་ལོག་_ཝ་རོང་བོ་རང་	Khesigang
Kengkhar སྐྱེངས་མཁར་	Neykolog Warongborang གནས་ཀོ་ལོག་_ཝ་རོང་བོ་རང་	Khochung
Kengkhar སྐྱེངས་མཁར་	Neykolog Warongborang གནས་ཀོ་ལོག་_ཝ་རོང་བོ་རང་	Khoishing
Kengkhar སྐྱེངས་མཁར་	Neykolog Warongborang གནས་ཀོ་ལོག་_ཝ་རོང་བོ་རང་	Maentsala
Kengkhar སྐྱེངས་མཁར་	Neykolog Warongborang གནས་ཀོ་ལོག་_ཝ་རོང་བོ་རང་	Nanari
Kengkhar སྐྱེངས་མཁར་	Neykolog Warongborang གནས་ཀོ་ལོག་_ཝ་རོང་བོ་རང་	Pangthang
Kengkhar སྐྱེངས་མཁར་	Neykolog Warongborang གནས་ཀོ་ལོག་_ཝ་རོང་བོ་རང་	Payka
Kengkhar སྐྱེངས་མཁར་	Neykolog Warongborang གནས་ཀོ་ལོག་_ཝ་རོང་བོ་རང་	Rishogay
Kengkhar སྐྱེངས་མཁར་	Neykolog Warongborang གནས་ཀོ་ལོག་_ཝ་རོང་བོ་རང་	Rizor
Kengkhar སྐྱེངས་མཁར་	Neykolog Warongborang གནས་ཀོ་ལོག་_ཝ་རོང་བོ་རང་	Suipari
Kengkhar སྐྱེངས་མཁར་	Neykolog Warongborang གནས་ཀོ་ལོག་_ཝ་རོང་བོ་རང་	Wangyer
Kengkhar སྐྱེངས་མཁར་	Neykolog Warongborang གནས་ཀོ་ལོག་_ཝ་རོང་བོ་རང་	Warongborang
Kengkhar སྐྱེངས་མཁར་	Olokid Tsalabi ཨོ་ལོ་སྐྱིད་_རྩལ་སྦིས་	Olkid
Kengkhar སྐྱེངས་མཁར་	Olokid Tsalabi ཨོ་ལོ་སྐྱིད་_རྩལ་སྦིས་	Tsalabi
Kengkhar སྐྱེངས་མཁར་	Olokid Tsalabi ཨོ་ལོ་སྐྱིད་_རྩལ་སྦིས་	Dongnala
Kengkhar སྐྱེངས་མཁར་	Olokid Tsalabi ཨོ་ལོ་སྐྱིད་_རྩལ་སྦིས་	Gyalkhar
Kengkhar སྐྱེངས་མཁར་	Olokid Tsalabi ཨོ་ལོ་སྐྱིད་_རྩལ་སྦིས་	Khurzong
Kengkhar སྐྱེངས་མཁར་	Olokid Tsalabi ཨོ་ལོ་སྐྱིད་_རྩལ་སྦིས་	Magola
Kengkhar སྐྱེངས་མཁར་	Olokid Tsalabi ཨོ་ལོ་སྐྱིད་_རྩལ་སྦིས་	Maenchabilam
Kengkhar སྐྱེངས་མཁར་	Phosothong Shingchongri ཕྭོ་སོ་མཐོང་_ཤིང་ལྕོང་རི་	Gunmari
Kengkhar སྐྱེངས་མཁར་	Phosothong Shingchongri ཕྭོ་སོ་མཐོང་_ཤིང་ལྕོང་རི་	Shingchongri
Kengkhar སྐྱེངས་མཁར་	Phosothong Shingchongri ཕྭོ་སོ་མཐོང་_ཤིང་ལྕོང་རི་	Deshingpeg
Kengkhar སྐྱེངས་མཁར་	Phosothong Shingchongri ཕྭོ་སོ་མཐོང་_ཤིང་ལྕོང་རི་	Drongphoog
Kengkhar སྐྱེངས་མཁར་	Phosothong Shingchongri ཕྭོ་སོ་མཐོང་_ཤིང་ལྕོང་རི་	Duezawong
Kengkhar སྐྱེངས་མཁར་	Phosothong Shingchongri ཕྭོ་སོ་མཐོང་_ཤིང་ལྕོང་རི་	Doongkargoerpa
Kengkhar སྐྱེངས་མཁར་	Phosothong Shingchongri ཕྭོ་སོ་མཐོང་_ཤིང་ལྕོང་རི་	Doongmarma
Kengkhar སྐྱེངས་མཁར་	Phosothong Shingchongri ཕྭོ་སོ་མཐོང་_ཤིང་ལྕོང་རི་	Magola
Kengkhar སྐྱེངས་མཁར་	Phosothong Shingchongri ཕྭོ་སོ་མཐོང་_ཤིང་ལྕོང་རི་	Pangthoong
Kengkhar སྐྱེངས་མཁར་	Phosothong Shingchongri ཕྭོ་སོ་མཐོང་_ཤིང་ལྕོང་རི་	Shetongbi
Kengkhar སྐྱེངས་མཁར་	Phosothong Shingchongri ཕྭོ་སོ་མཐོང་_ཤིང་ལྕོང་རི་	Tshamnagri
Kengkhar སྐྱེངས་མཁར་	Phosothong Shingchongri ཕྭོ་སོ་མཐོང་_ཤིང་ལྕོང་རི་	Tshelshingtang
Kengkhar སྐྱེངས་མཁར་	Phosothong Shingchongri ཕྭོ་སོ་མཐོང་_ཤིང་ལྕོང་རི་	Zor
Kengkhar སྐྱེངས་མཁར་	Phosothong Shingchongri ཕྭོ་སོ་མཐོང་_ཤིང་ལྕོང་རི་	Khangma
Kengkhar སྐྱེངས་མཁར་	Phosothong Shingchongri ཕྭོ་སོ་མཐོང་_ཤིང་ལྕོང་རི་	Aring
Kengkhar སྐྱེངས་མཁར་	Phosothong Shingchongri ཕྭོ་སོ་མཐོང་_ཤིང་ལྕོང་རི་	Kuli
Kengkhar སྐྱེངས་མཁར་	Phosothong Shingchongri ཕྭོ་སོ་མཐོང་_ཤིང་ལྕོང་རི་	Serkong
Kengkhar སྐྱེངས་མཁར་	Phosothong Shingchongri ཕྭོ་སོ་མཐོང་_ཤིང་ལྕོང་རི་	Munma
Kengkhar སྐྱེངས་མཁར་	Phosothong Shingchongri ཕྭོ་སོ་མཐོང་_ཤིང་ལྕོང་རི་	Ebi
Kengkhar སྐྱེངས་མཁར་	Phosothong Shingchongri ཕྭོ་སོ་མཐོང་_ཤིང་ལྕོང་རི་	Artshong
Kengkhar སྐྱེངས་མཁར་	Phosothong Shingchongri ཕྭོ་སོ་མཐོང་_ཤིང་ལྕོང་རི་	Kyidpari
Kengkhar སྐྱེངས་མཁར་	Phosothong Shingchongri ཕྭོ་སོ་མཐོང་_ཤིང་ལྕོང་རི་	Nadang
Kengkhar སྐྱེངས་མཁར་	Phosothong Shingchongri ཕྭོ་སོ་མཐོང་_ཤིང་ལྕོང་རི་	Pedoongroong
Mongar མོང་སྒར་	Themnangbi Kentongri ཐེམ་ནང་སྦིས་_ཀེ་སྟོང་རི་	Themnangbi
Mongar མོང་སྒར་	Koenbar Tagchhu ཀོན་བར་_ལྟག་ཆུ་	Koenbar
Mongar མོང་སྒར་	Koenbar Tagchhu ཀོན་བར་_ལྟག་ཆུ་	Tagchhu
Mongar མོང་སྒར་	Wengkhar Yagpoogang ཝེང་མཁར་_གཡག་སྤུ་བསྒང་	Jalbab
Mongar མོང་སྒར་	Wengkhar Yagpoogang ཝེང་མཁར་_གཡག་སྤུ་བསྒང་	Wengkhar
Mongar མོང་སྒར་	Wengkhar Yagpoogang ཝེང་མཁར་_གཡག་སྤུ་བསྒང་	Yagpoogang
Mongar མོང་སྒར་	Kidekhar སྐྱིད་བདེ་མཁར་	Kidekhar
Mongar མོང་སྒར་	Phosorong ཕོ་སོ་རོང་	Phosorong
Mongar མོང་སྒར་	Phosorong ཕོ་སོ་རོང་	Pirbi
Mongar མོང་སྒར་	Phosorong ཕོ་སོ་རོང་	Gora
Mongar མོང་སྒར་	Phosorong ཕོ་སོ་རོང་	Kadam
Mongar མོང་སྒར་	Phosorong ཕོ་སོ་རོང་	Kheshirpang
Mongar མོང་སྒར་	Phosorong ཕོ་སོ་རོང་	Lukpangthang
Mongar མོང་སྒར་	Phosorong ཕོ་སོ་རོང་	Nagling
Mongar མོང་སྒར་	Phosorong ཕོ་སོ་རོང་	Nyekhang
Mongar མོང་སྒར་	Phosorong ཕོ་སོ་རོང་	Pirbi
Mongar མོང་སྒར་	Phosorong ཕོ་སོ་རོང་	Pirbi
Mongar མོང་སྒར་	Phosorong ཕོ་སོ་རོང་	Shongkaling
Mongar མོང་སྒར་	Phosorong ཕོ་སོ་རོང་	Tsenglung Goenpa
Mongar མོང་སྒར་	Phosorong ཕོ་སོ་རོང་	Jamcholing
Mongar མོང་སྒར་	Phosorong ཕོ་སོ་རོང་	Barpang
Mongar མོང་སྒར་	Phosorong ཕོ་སོ་རོང་	Monggar
Mongar མོང་སྒར་	Phosorong ཕོ་སོ་རོང་	Trailing
Mongar མོང་སྒར་	Gyalpoizhing Wangling རྒྱལ་པོའི་ཞིང་_ཝང་གླིང་	Wangling
Mongar མོང་སྒར་	Gyalpoizhing Wangling རྒྱལ་པོའི་ཞིང་_ཝང་གླིང་	Gyelpoizhing
Narang ན་རང་	Khalong ཁ་ཀློང་	Khalong
Narang ན་རང་	Thrinangphu ཁྲི་ནང་ཕུ་	Phusizur
Narang ན་རང་	Thrinangphu ཁྲི་ནང་ཕུ་	Thrinangphu
Narang ན་རང་	Gomchhu སྒོམ་ཆུ་	Gomchhu
Narang ན་རང་	Gomchhu སྒོམ་ཆུ་	Gomchhuzur
Narang ན་རང་	Gomchhu སྒོམ་ཆུ་	Hurchilo
Narang ན་རང་	Gomchhu སྒོམ་ཆུ་	Bumpa
Narang ན་རང་	Gomchhu སྒོམ་ཆུ་	Deyphung
Narang ན་རང་	Gomchhu སྒོམ་ཆུ་	Phenzur
Narang ན་རང་	Narang Pangthang ན་རང་_སྤང་ཐང་	Chhema
Narang ན་རང་	Narang Pangthang ན་རང་_སྤང་ཐང་	Narang
Narang ན་རང་	Narang Pangthang ན་རང་_སྤང་ཐང་	Brakhagthang
Narang ན་རང་	Narang Pangthang ན་རང་_སྤང་ཐང་	Chagsakhar
Narang ན་རང་	Narang Pangthang ན་རང་_སྤང་ཐང་	Dangthung
Narang ན་རང་	Narang Pangthang ན་རང་_སྤང་ཐང་	Dengsor
Narang ན་རང་	Narang Pangthang ན་རང་_སྤང་ཐང་	Garpamani
Narang ན་རང་	Narang Pangthang ན་རང་_སྤང་ཐང་	Gothonpo
Narang ན་རང་	Narang Pangthang ན་རང་_སྤང་ཐང་	Jomri
Narang ན་རང་	Narang Pangthang ན་རང་_སྤང་ཐང་	Maithung
Narang ན་རང་	Narang Pangthang ན་རང་_སྤང་ཐང་	Pangthang
Narang ན་རང་	Narang Pangthang ན་རང་_སྤང་ཐང་	Thongkhar
Narang ན་རང་	Narang Pangthang ན་རང་_སྤང་ཐང་	Wangyer
Narang ན་རང་	Narang Pangthang ན་རང་_སྤང་ཐང་	Waphaipangthang
Narang ན་རང་	Dongshoom Pangkhang གདོང་ཤུམ་_སྤང་ཁང་	Pangkhang
Narang ན་རང་	Dongshoom Pangkhang གདོང་ཤུམ་_སྤང་ཁང་	Besipoktor
Narang ན་རང་	Dongshoom Pangkhang གདོང་ཤུམ་_སྤང་ཁང་	Dongshoom
Narang ན་རང་	Dongshoom Pangkhang གདོང་ཤུམ་_སྤང་ཁང་	Gashari
Narang ན་རང་	Dongshoom Pangkhang གདོང་ཤུམ་_སྤང་ཁང་	Narang Pangkang
Narang ན་རང་	Dongshoom Pangkhang གདོང་ཤུམ་_སྤང་ཁང་	Narang Besipoktor
Narang ན་རང་	Dongshoom Pangkhang གདོང་ཤུམ་_སྤང་ཁང་	Narang Raynangkhar
Narang ན་རང་	Dongshoom Pangkhang གདོང་ཤུམ་_སྤང་ཁང་	Narang Phaphugpangkang
Ngatshang སྔ་ཚང་	Ngatshaang སྔ་ཚང་	Ngatshang
Ngatshang སྔ་ཚང་	Nyingala Phanasi སྙིང་དགའ་ལ་_ཕ་ན་སི་	Phanasi
Ngatshang སྔ་ཚང་	Nyingala Phanasi སྙིང་དགའ་ལ་_ཕ་ན་སི་	Nyingala
Ngatshang སྔ་ཚང་	Thoombari Zangdari ཐུམ་བ་རི་_ཟངས་ད་རི་	Thoombari
Ngatshang སྔ་ཚང་	Thoombari Zangdari ཐུམ་བ་རི་_ཟངས་ད་རི་	Zangdari
Ngatshang སྔ་ཚང་	Pelshoob སྤེལ་ཤུབས་	Goenpa
Ngatshang སྔ་ཚང་	Pelshoob སྤེལ་ཤུབས་	Pelshool
Ngatshang སྔ་ཚང་	Yadi Yekhar ཡ་དི་_ཡེ་མཁར་	Yekhar
Ngatshang སྔ་ཚང་	Yadi Yekhar ཡ་དི་_ཡེ་མཁར་	Bumpazor
Saling ས་གླིང་	Senggor གསེང་སྒོར་	Seng-Gor
Saling ས་གླིང་	Saling ས་གླིང་	Saling
Saling ས་གླིང་	Thridangbi ཁྲི་དང་སྦི་	Thridangbi
Saling ས་གླིང་	Tsenzabi Masangdaza བཙན་ཟ་སྦི་_མ་སྲང་ད་ཟ་	Bongdeyma
Saling ས་གླིང་	Tsenzabi Masangdaza བཙན་ཟ་སྦི་_མ་སྲང་ད་ཟ་	Jangdung
Saling ས་གླིང་	Tsenzabi Masangdaza བཙན་ཟ་སྦི་_མ་སྲང་ད་ཟ་	Masangdaza
Saling ས་གླིང་	Tsenzabi Masangdaza བཙན་ཟ་སྦི་_མ་སྲང་ད་ཟ་	Tshenzabi
Saling ས་གླིང་	Tsenzabi Masangdaza བཙན་ཟ་སྦི་_མ་སྲང་ད་ཟ་	Pangsibi
Saling ས་གླིང་	Drogsar འབྲོག་གསར་	Drogsar
Saling ས་གླིང་	Drogsar འབྲོག་གསར་	Drogsar/Mangling
Saling ས་གླིང་	Kalapang Resa ཀ་ལ་སྤང་_རེ་ས་	Kalapang
Saling ས་གླིང་	Kalapang Resa ཀ་ལ་སྤང་_རེ་ས་	Resa
Shermuhoong ཤེར་མུ་ཧཱུྃ་	Soenakhar Yarab བསོད་ན་མཁར་_ཡ་རབ་	Soenakhar
Shermuhoong ཤེར་མུ་ཧཱུྃ་	Jabang Thueling རྒྱབ་སྒང་_མཐུ་གླིང་	Jabgang
Shermuhoong ཤེར་མུ་ཧཱུྃ་	Jabang Thueling རྒྱབ་སྒང་_མཐུ་གླིང་	Thueling
Shermuhoong ཤེར་མུ་ཧཱུྃ་	Malang Serzhong མ་ལང་_གསེར་གཞོང་	Serzhong
Shermuhoong ཤེར་མུ་ཧཱུྃ་	Muhoong Shiling མུ་ཧཱུྃ_ཤི་གླིང་	Muhoong
Shermuhoong ཤེར་མུ་ཧཱུྃ་	Muhoong Shiling མུ་ཧཱུྃ_ཤི་གླིང་	Shiling
Shermuhoong ཤེར་མུ་ཧཱུྃ་	Gangmoong སྒང་མུང་	Gangmoong
Silambi སི་ལམ་སྦི་	Wama ཝ་མ་	Yarig
Silambi སི་ལམ་སྦི་	Wama ཝ་མ་	Wama
Silambi སི་ལམ་སྦི་	Wama ཝ་མ་	Wama/Chang Changma
Silambi སི་ལམ་སྦི་	Daag དག་	Daag
Silambi སི་ལམ་སྦི་	Kadag Silambi ཀ་དག་_སི་ལམ་སྦི་	Baribang
Silambi སི་ལམ་སྦི་	Kadag Silambi ཀ་དག་_སི་ལམ་སྦི་	Dekdongla
Silambi སི་ལམ་སྦི་	Kadag Silambi ཀ་དག་_སི་ལམ་སྦི་	Goenpa
Silambi སི་ལམ་སྦི་	Kadag Silambi ཀ་དག་_སི་ལམ་སྦི་	Kadag
Silambi སི་ལམ་སྦི་	Kadag Silambi ཀ་དག་_སི་ལམ་སྦི་	Kadag/Salipong
Silambi སི་ལམ་སྦི་	Kadag Silambi ཀ་དག་_སི་ལམ་སྦི་	Kangkari
Silambi སི་ལམ་སྦི་	Kadag Silambi ཀ་དག་_སི་ལམ་སྦི་	Khatoed
Silambi སི་ལམ་སྦི་	Kadag Silambi ཀ་དག་_སི་ལམ་སྦི་	Khatoed/Baribang
Silambi སི་ལམ་སྦི་	Kadag Silambi ཀ་དག་_སི་ལམ་སྦི་	Khatoed/Silambi
Silambi སི་ལམ་སྦི་	Kadag Silambi ཀ་དག་_སི་ལམ་སྦི་	Salipong
Silambi སི་ལམ་སྦི་	Kadag Silambi ཀ་དག་_སི་ལམ་སྦི་	Silambi
Silambi སི་ལམ་སྦི་	Kadag Silambi ཀ་དག་_སི་ལམ་སྦི་	Silambi/Lemigoenpa
Silambi སི་ལམ་སྦི་	Kadag Silambi ཀ་དག་_སི་ལམ་སྦི་	Silambi/Tumdrag
Silambi སི་ལམ་སྦི་	Gyalong རྒྱལ་གོང་	Gyalong
Silambi སི་ལམ་སྦི་	Gyalong རྒྱལ་གོང་	Nagor/Pam
Silambi སི་ལམ་སྦི་	Gyalong རྒྱལ་གོང་	Pam
Silambi སི་ལམ་སྦི་	Pang Nagor སྤང་_ན་སྒོར་	Nagor
Silambi སི་ལམ་སྦི་	Pang Nagor སྤང་_ན་སྒོར་	Nagor Goenpa
Silambi སི་ལམ་སྦི་	Pang Nagor སྤང་_ན་སྒོར་	Laijuk
Silambi སི་ལམ་སྦི་	Pang Nagor སྤང་_ན་སྒོར་	Kangkangma
Silambi སི་ལམ་སྦི་	Pang Nagor སྤང་_ན་སྒོར་	Nagor Pang
Silambi སི་ལམ་སྦི་	Pang Nagor སྤང་_ན་སྒོར་	Pang Gyerteng
Silambi སི་ལམ་སྦི་	Pang Nagor སྤང་_ན་སྒོར་	Pang Gyerteng/Goenpa
Silambi སི་ལམ་སྦི་	Pang Nagor སྤང་_ན་སྒོར་	Pang Gyerteng/Phungling
Thangrong ཐང་རོང་	Changshing ལྕང་ཤིང་	Changshing
Thangrong ཐང་རོང་	Bauchhoeling Panglen སྦའུ་ཆོས་གླིང་_སྤང་ལེན་	Baucholing
Thangrong ཐང་རོང་	Bauchhoeling Panglen སྦའུ་ཆོས་གླིང་_སྤང་ལེན་	Panglen
Thangrong ཐང་རོང་	Atola ཨ་ཏོ་ལ་	Atola
Thangrong ཐང་རོང་	Lingkhar གླིང་མཁར་	Lingkhar
Thangrong ཐང་རོང་	Ngaru Pongtang ངར་རུ་སྤོང་སྟང་	Ngaru-Pongtang
Tsakaling ཙ་ཀ་གླིང་	Tagkhambi སྟག་ཁམས་སྦི་	Tagkhambi/Norbugang
Tsakaling ཙ་ཀ་གླིང་	Tagkhambi སྟག་ཁམས་སྦི་	Tagkhambi/Barnang
Tsakaling ཙ་ཀ་གླིང་	Tagkhambi སྟག་ཁམས་སྦི་	Tagkhambi/Chimsaning
Tsakaling ཙ་ཀ་གླིང་	Tagkhambi སྟག་ཁམས་སྦི་	Tagkhambi/Dekiling
Tsakaling ཙ་ཀ་གླིང་	Tagkhambi སྟག་ཁམས་སྦི་	Tagkhambi/Gangka
Tsakaling ཙ་ཀ་གླིང་	Tagkhambi སྟག་ཁམས་སྦི་	Tagkhambi/Khoboom
Tsakaling ཙ་ཀ་གླིང་	Tagkhambi སྟག་ཁམས་སྦི་	Tagkhambi/Khomdangchhu
Tsakaling ཙ་ཀ་གླིང་	Tagkhambi སྟག་ཁམས་སྦི་	Tagkhambi/Kuengachhoeling
Tsakaling ཙ་ཀ་གླིང་	Tagkhambi སྟག་ཁམས་སྦི་	Tagkhambi/Pang
Tsakaling ཙ་ཀ་གླིང་	Tagkhambi སྟག་ཁམས་སྦི་	Tagkhambi/Wadong
Tsakaling ཙ་ཀ་གླིང་	Tagkhambi སྟག་ཁམས་སྦི་	Tagkhambi/Yerchung
Tsakaling ཙ་ཀ་གླིང་	Tagkhambi སྟག་ཁམས་སྦི་	Tagkhambi/Gendrang
Tsakaling ཙ་ཀ་གླིང་	Tagkhambi སྟག་ཁམས་སྦི་	Langabi
Tsakaling ཙ་ཀ་གླིང་	Tagkhambi སྟག་ཁམས་སྦི་	Pang
Tsakaling ཙ་ཀ་གླིང་	Tagkhambi སྟག་ཁམས་སྦི་	Tagkhamtey
Tsakaling ཙ་ཀ་གླིང་	Kaling Thoomling ཀ་གླིང་_ཐུམ་གླིང་	Chalgang
Tsakaling ཙ་ཀ་གླིང་	Kaling Thoomling ཀ་གླིང་_ཐུམ་གླིང་	Chalgang/Kaling
Tsakaling ཙ་ཀ་གླིང་	Kaling Thoomling ཀ་གླིང་_ཐུམ་གླིང་	Chalgang/Thowalsa
Tsakaling ཙ་ཀ་གླིང་	Kaling Thoomling ཀ་གླིང་_ཐུམ་གླིང་	Chubar
Tsakaling ཙ་ཀ་གླིང་	Kaling Thoomling ཀ་གླིང་_ཐུམ་གླིང་	Karshingang
Tsakaling ཙ་ཀ་གླིང་	Kaling Thoomling ཀ་གླིང་_ཐུམ་གླིང་	Damtshang Pokpa
Tsakaling ཙ་ཀ་གླིང་	Kaling Thoomling ཀ་གླིང་_ཐུམ་གླིང་	Demoongla
Tsakaling ཙ་ཀ་གླིང་	Kaling Thoomling ཀ་གླིང་_ཐུམ་གླིང་	Thoomling
Tsakaling ཙ་ཀ་གླིང་	Kaling Thoomling ཀ་གླིང་_ཐུམ་གླིང་	Pangtshela
Tsakaling ཙ་ཀ་གླིང་	Kaling Thoomling ཀ་གླིང་_ཐུམ་གླིང་	Shingmar Pokpa
Tsakaling ཙ་ཀ་གླིང་	Kaling Thoomling ཀ་གླིང་_ཐུམ་གླིང་	Churtsha
Tsakaling ཙ་ཀ་གླིང་	Kaling Thoomling ཀ་གླིང་_ཐུམ་གླིང་	Dokporo
Tsakaling ཙ་ཀ་གླིང་	Kaling Thoomling ཀ་གླིང་_ཐུམ་གླིང་	Loongkang
Tsakaling ཙ་ཀ་གླིང་	Kaling Thoomling ཀ་གླིང་_ཐུམ་གླིང་	Tshodrang
Tsakaling ཙ་ཀ་གླིང་	Kaling Thoomling ཀ་གླིང་_ཐུམ་གླིང་	Legibi
Tsakaling ཙ་ཀ་གླིང་	Kaling Thoomling ཀ་གླིང་_ཐུམ་གླིང་	Nagtshang
Tsakaling ཙ་ཀ་གླིང་	Kaling Thoomling ཀ་གླིང་_ཐུམ་གླིང་	Paytshorgbi
Tsakaling ཙ་ཀ་གླིང་	Kaling Thoomling ཀ་གླིང་_ཐུམ་གླིང་	Paytshorgbi/Balamchungku
Tsakaling ཙ་ཀ་གླིང་	Kaling Thoomling ཀ་གླིང་_ཐུམ་གླིང་	Paytshorgbi/Rababi
Tsakaling ཙ་ཀ་གླིང་	Nyartsi Tsakaling ཉར་རྩི་_ཙ་ཀ་གླིང་	Dolebtang
Tsakaling ཙ་ཀ་གླིང་	Nyartsi Tsakaling ཉར་རྩི་_ཙ་ཀ་གླིང་	Gamanang
Tsakaling ཙ་ཀ་གླིང་	Nyartsi Tsakaling ཉར་རྩི་_ཙ་ཀ་གླིང་	Legibi
Tsakaling ཙ་ཀ་གླིང་	Nyartsi Tsakaling ཉར་རྩི་_ཙ་ཀ་གླིང་	Gamanang/Loongdubi
Tsakaling ཙ་ཀ་གླིང་	Nyartsi Tsakaling ཉར་རྩི་_ཙ་ཀ་གླིང་	Jangtagoen
Tsakaling ཙ་ཀ་གླིང་	Nyartsi Tsakaling ཉར་རྩི་_ཙ་ཀ་གླིང་	Lewamani
Tsakaling ཙ་ཀ་གླིང་	Nyartsi Tsakaling ཉར་རྩི་_ཙ་ཀ་གླིང་	Loongdubi
Tsakaling ཙ་ཀ་གླིང་	Nyartsi Tsakaling ཉར་རྩི་_ཙ་ཀ་གླིང་	Nyartsi
Tsakaling ཙ་ཀ་གླིང་	Nyartsi Tsakaling ཉར་རྩི་_ཙ་ཀ་གླིང་	Nyartsi/Shaboom
Tsakaling ཙ་ཀ་གླིང་	Nyartsi Tsakaling ཉར་རྩི་_ཙ་ཀ་གླིང་	Nyartsi/Singma Nangka
Tsakaling ཙ་ཀ་གླིང་	Nyartsi Tsakaling ཉར་རྩི་_ཙ་ཀ་གླིང་	Nyartsi/Tsema Nangka
Tsakaling ཙ་ཀ་གླིང་	Nyartsi Tsakaling ཉར་རྩི་_ཙ་ཀ་གླིང་	Thongzhong Goenpa
Tsakaling ཙ་ཀ་གླིང་	Drengling Horong དྲེང་གླིང་_ཧོ་རོང་	Zangtoong
Tsakaling ཙ་ཀ་གླིང་	Drengling Horong དྲེང་གླིང་_ཧོ་རོང་	Aringtengma
Tsakaling ཙ་ཀ་གླིང་	Drengling Horong དྲེང་གླིང་_ཧོ་རོང་	Khanashing
Tsakaling ཙ་ཀ་གླིང་	Drengling Horong དྲེང་གླིང་_ཧོ་རོང་	Churtoog
Tsakaling ཙ་ཀ་གླིང་	Drengling Horong དྲེང་གླིང་_ཧོ་རོང་	Drenling
Tsakaling ཙ་ཀ་གླིང་	Drengling Horong དྲེང་གླིང་_ཧོ་རོང་	Drenling/Dabang
Tsakaling ཙ་ཀ་གླིང་	Drengling Horong དྲེང་གླིང་_ཧོ་རོང་	Drenling/Emalaphuk
Tsakaling ཙ་ཀ་གླིང་	Drengling Horong དྲེང་གླིང་_ཧོ་རོང་	Drenling/Gangka
Tsakaling ཙ་ཀ་གླིང་	Drengling Horong དྲེང་གླིང་_ཧོ་རོང་	Drenling/Gaptangra
Tsakaling ཙ་ཀ་གླིང་	Drengling Horong དྲེང་གླིང་_ཧོ་རོང་	Drenling/Kadamwo
Tsakaling ཙ་ཀ་གླིང་	Drengling Horong དྲེང་གླིང་_ཧོ་རོང་	Drenling/Khanakshing
Tsakaling ཙ་ཀ་གླིང་	Drengling Horong དྲེང་གླིང་_ཧོ་རོང་	Drongtoed Mawo
Tsakaling ཙ་ཀ་གླིང་	Drengling Horong དྲེང་གླིང་_ཧོ་རོང་	Horong
Tsakaling ཙ་ཀ་གླིང་	Drengling Horong དྲེང་གླིང་_ཧོ་རོང་	Khimsang
Tsakaling ཙ་ཀ་གླིང་	Drengling Horong དྲེང་གླིང་_ཧོ་རོང་	Leksingphu
Tsakaling ཙ་ཀ་གླིང་	Drengling Horong དྲེང་གླིང་_ཧོ་རོང་	Leksingphu/Drengling
Tsakaling ཙ་ཀ་གླིང་	Drengling Horong དྲེང་གླིང་_ཧོ་རོང་	Leksingphu/Bongring
Tsakaling ཙ་ཀ་གླིང་	Drengling Horong དྲེང་གླིང་_ཧོ་རོང་	Leksingphu/Churtung
Tsakaling ཙ་ཀ་གླིང་	Drengling Horong དྲེང་གླིང་_ཧོ་རོང་	Leksingphu/Dogtang
Tsakaling ཙ་ཀ་གླིང་	Drengling Horong དྲེང་གླིང་_ཧོ་རོང་	Leksingphu/Kadam
Tsakaling ཙ་ཀ་གླིང་	Drengling Horong དྲེང་གླིང་_ཧོ་རོང་	Leksingphu/Thongwang
Tsakaling ཙ་ཀ་གླིང་	Drengling Horong དྲེང་གླིང་_ཧོ་རོང་	Sowangtey
Tsakaling ཙ་ཀ་གླིང་	Drengling Horong དྲེང་གླིང་_ཧོ་རོང་	Talabadhap
Tsakaling ཙ་ཀ་གླིང་	Drengling Horong དྲེང་གླིང་_ཧོ་རོང་	Terkong
Tsakaling ཙ་ཀ་གླིང་	Drengling Horong དྲེང་གླིང་_ཧོ་རོང་	Tormazhong/Thongwang
Tsakaling ཙ་ཀ་གླིང་	Drengling Horong དྲེང་གླིང་_ཧོ་རོང་	Zhingjigpala
Tsakaling ཙ་ཀ་གླིང་	Drongtoed Tormazhong གྲོང་སྟོད་_སྟོར་མ་གཞོང་	Paytshongbi
Tsakaling ཙ་ཀ་གླིང་	Drongtoed Tormazhong གྲོང་སྟོད་_སྟོར་མ་གཞོང་	Angtonyelsa
Tsakaling ཙ་ཀ་གླིང་	Drongtoed Tormazhong གྲོང་སྟོད་_སྟོར་མ་གཞོང་	Artogang
Tsakaling ཙ་ཀ་གླིང་	Drongtoed Tormazhong གྲོང་སྟོད་_སྟོར་མ་གཞོང་	Khashalbadap
Tsakaling ཙ་ཀ་གླིང་	Drongtoed Tormazhong གྲོང་སྟོད་_སྟོར་མ་གཞོང་	Lhadrang
Tsakaling ཙ་ཀ་གླིང་	Drongtoed Tormazhong གྲོང་སྟོད་_སྟོར་མ་གཞོང་	Norbugang
Tsakaling ཙ་ཀ་གླིང་	Drongtoed Tormazhong གྲོང་སྟོད་_སྟོར་མ་གཞོང་	Chutey
Tsakaling ཙ་ཀ་གླིང་	Drongtoed Tormazhong གྲོང་སྟོད་_སྟོར་མ་གཞོང་	Dolebtang
Tsakaling ཙ་ཀ་གླིང་	Drongtoed Tormazhong གྲོང་སྟོད་_སྟོར་མ་གཞོང་	Domula
Tsakaling ཙ་ཀ་གླིང་	Drongtoed Tormazhong གྲོང་སྟོད་_སྟོར་མ་གཞོང་	Khashagang
Tsakaling ཙ་ཀ་གླིང་	Drongtoed Tormazhong གྲོང་སྟོད་_སྟོར་མ་གཞོང་	Thodamla
Tsakaling ཙ་ཀ་གླིང་	Drongtoed Tormazhong གྲོང་སྟོད་_སྟོར་མ་གཞོང་	Threwatong
Tsakaling ཙ་ཀ་གླིང་	Drongtoed Tormazhong གྲོང་སྟོད་_སྟོར་མ་གཞོང་	Yartogang
Tsakaling ཙ་ཀ་གླིང་	Drongtoed Tormazhong གྲོང་སྟོད་_སྟོར་མ་གཞོང་	Pherpobadap
Tsakaling ཙ་ཀ་གླིང་	Drongtoed Tormazhong གྲོང་སྟོད་_སྟོར་མ་གཞོང་	Selwa Lhakhang
Tsakaling ཙ་ཀ་གླིང་	Drongtoed Tormazhong གྲོང་སྟོད་_སྟོར་མ་གཞོང་	Tharmcharm
Tsakaling ཙ་ཀ་གླིང་	Drongtoed Tormazhong གྲོང་སྟོད་_སྟོར་མ་གཞོང་	Tormazhong/Lhakhang
Tsakaling ཙ་ཀ་གླིང་	Drongtoed Tormazhong གྲོང་སྟོད་_སྟོར་མ་གཞོང་	Thormazhong/Wadong
Tsakaling ཙ་ཀ་གླིང་	Drongtoed Tormazhong གྲོང་སྟོད་_སྟོར་མ་གཞོང་	Wadong
Tsakaling ཙ་ཀ་གླིང་	Drongtoed Tormazhong གྲོང་སྟོད་_སྟོར་མ་གཞོང་	Yabi
Tsamang རྩ་མང་	Ganglapong Maed སྒང་ལ་སྤོངས་སྨད་	Ganglapong
Tsamang རྩ་མང་	Ganglapong Maed སྒང་ལ་སྤོངས་སྨད་	Ganglapong/Barigang
Tsamang རྩ་མང་	Ganglapong Maed སྒང་ལ་སྤོངས་སྨད་	Ganglapong/Barilungpa
Tsamang རྩ་མང་	Ganglapong Maed སྒང་ལ་སྤོངས་སྨད་	Ganglapong/Bongring
Tsamang རྩ་མང་	Ganglapong Maed སྒང་ལ་སྤོངས་སྨད་	Ganglapong/Darshingwog
Tsamang རྩ་མང་	Ganglapong Maed སྒང་ལ་སྤོངས་སྨད་	Ganglapong/Dechenling
Tsamang རྩ་མང་	Ganglapong Maed སྒང་ལ་སྤོངས་སྨད་	Ganglapong/Gawaling
Tsamang རྩ་མང་	Ganglapong Maed སྒང་ལ་སྤོངས་སྨད་	Ganglapong/Halong
Tsamang རྩ་མང་	Ganglapong Maed སྒང་ལ་སྤོངས་སྨད་	Ganglapong/Khuling
Tsamang རྩ་མང་	Ganglapong Maed སྒང་ལ་སྤོངས་སྨད་	Ganglapong/Korshing
Tsamang རྩ་མང་	Ganglapong Maed སྒང་ལ་སྤོངས་སྨད་	Ganglapong/Leochen
Tsamang རྩ་མང་	Ganglapong Maed སྒང་ལ་སྤོངས་སྨད་	Ganglapong/Lhakhang
Tsamang རྩ་མང་	Ganglapong Maed སྒང་ལ་སྤོངས་སྨད་	Ganglapong/Ney
Tsamang རྩ་མང་	Ganglapong Maed སྒང་ལ་སྤོངས་སྨད་	Ganglapong/Pang
Tsamang རྩ་མང་	Ganglapong Maed སྒང་ལ་སྤོངས་སྨད་	Ganglapong/Phuntsholing
Tsamang རྩ་མང་	Ganglapong Maed སྒང་ལ་སྤོངས་སྨད་	Ganglapong/Rewochakgang
Tsamang རྩ་མང་	Ganglapong Maed སྒང་ལ་སྤོངས་སྨད་	Ganglapong/Samabar
Tsamang རྩ་མང་	Ganglapong Maed སྒང་ལ་སྤོངས་སྨད་	Ganglapong/Samling
Tsamang རྩ་མང་	Ganglapong Maed སྒང་ལ་སྤོངས་སྨད་	Ganglapong/Sothriling
Tsamang རྩ་མང་	Ganglapong Maed སྒང་ལ་སྤོངས་སྨད་	Ganglapong/Tebiling
Tsamang རྩ་མང་	Ganglapong Maed སྒང་ལ་སྤོངས་སྨད་	Ganglapong/Wachen
Tsamang རྩ་མང་	Ganglapong Toed སྒང་ལ་སྤོངས་སྟོད་	Ganglapong/Ausudor
Tsamang རྩ་མང་	Ganglapong Toed སྒང་ལ་སྤོངས་སྟོད་	Ganglapong/Changchen
Tsamang རྩ་མང་	Ganglapong Toed སྒང་ལ་སྤོངས་སྟོད་	Ganglapong/Chaptang
Tsamang རྩ་མང་	Ganglapong Toed སྒང་ལ་སྤོངས་སྟོད་	Ganglapong/Genzangtse
Tsamang རྩ་མང་	Ganglapong Toed སྒང་ལ་སྤོངས་སྟོད་	Ganglapong/Goenpa
Tsamang རྩ་མང་	Ganglapong Toed སྒང་ལ་སྤོངས་སྟོད་	Ganglapong/Goenpokpa
Tsamang རྩ་མང་	Ganglapong Toed སྒང་ལ་སྤོངས་སྟོད་	Ganglapong/Golitagpa
Tsamang རྩ་མང་	Ganglapong Toed སྒང་ལ་སྤོངས་སྟོད་	Ganglapong/Jalamwog
Tsamang རྩ་མང་	Ganglapong Toed སྒང་ལ་སྤོངས་སྟོད་	Ganglapong/Karshingtsa
Tsamang རྩ་མང་	Ganglapong Toed སྒང་ལ་སྤོངས་སྟོད་	Ganglapong/Lowatongkang
Tsamang རྩ་མང་	Ganglapong Toed སྒང་ལ་སྤོངས་སྟོད་	Ganglapong/Manitakpa
Tsamang རྩ་མང་	Ganglapong Toed སྒང་ལ་སྤོངས་སྟོད་	Ganglapong/Nyaka
Tsamang རྩ་མང་	Ganglapong Toed སྒང་ལ་སྤོངས་སྟོད་	Ganglapong/Pangthangtoe
Tsamang རྩ་མང་	Ganglapong Toed སྒང་ལ་སྤོངས་སྟོད་	Ganglapong/Samarchen
Tsamang རྩ་མང་	Ganglapong Toed སྒང་ལ་སྤོངས་སྟོད་	Ganglapong/Senshingbi
Tsamang རྩ་མང་	Ganglapong Toed སྒང་ལ་སྤོངས་སྟོད་	Ganglapong/Shoksholong
Tsamang རྩ་མང་	Ganglapong Toed སྒང་ལ་སྤོངས་སྟོད་	Ganglapong/Tashiling
Tsamang རྩ་མང་	Ganglapong Toed སྒང་ལ་སྤོངས་སྟོད་	Ganglapong/Tashipai
Tsamang རྩ་མང་	Ganglapong Toed སྒང་ལ་སྤོངས་སྟོད་	Ganglapong/Tashizanglung
Tsamang རྩ་མང་	Ganglapong Toed སྒང་ལ་སྤོངས་སྟོད་	Ganglapong/Thongjalingwog
Tsamang རྩ་མང་	Ganglapong Toed སྒང་ལ་སྤོངས་སྟོད་	Ganglapong/Thongshingtakpa
Tsamang རྩ་མང་	Ganglapong Toed སྒང་ལ་སྤོངས་སྟོད་	Ganglapong/Tsendentsawa
Tsamang རྩ་མང་	Ganglapong Toed སྒང་ལ་སྤོངས་སྟོད་	Ganglapong/Zangshingtsawa
Tsamang རྩ་མང་	Ganglapong Toed སྒང་ལ་སྤོངས་སྟོད་	Ganglapong/Zhenthen
Tsamang རྩ་མང་	Ganglapong Toed སྒང་ལ་སྤོངས་སྟོད་	Ganglapong/Baboochu
Tsamang རྩ་མང་	Ganglapong Toed སྒང་ལ་སྤོངས་སྟོད་	Ganglapong/Dawashing
Tsamang རྩ་མང་	Baanjar བན་སྦྱར་	Banjar
Tsamang རྩ་མང་	Baanjar བན་སྦྱར་	Banjar/Bardang
Tsamang རྩ་མང་	Baanjar བན་སྦྱར་	Banjar/Barlam
Tsamang རྩ་མང་	Baanjar བན་སྦྱར་	Banjar/Gangkhadung
Tsamang རྩ་མང་	Baanjar བན་སྦྱར་	Banjar/Gomchenberpo
Tsamang རྩ་མང་	Baanjar བན་སྦྱར་	Banjar/Jampeling
Tsamang རྩ་མང་	Baanjar བན་སྦྱར་	Banjar/Jargay
Tsamang རྩ་མང་	Baanjar བན་སྦྱར་	Banjar/Khemsar
Tsamang རྩ་མང་	Baanjar བན་སྦྱར་	Banjar/Kicheling
Tsamang རྩ་མང་	Baanjar བན་སྦྱར་	Banjar/Lhakhang
Tsamang རྩ་མང་	Baanjar བན་སྦྱར་	Banjar/Dongmey
Tsamang རྩ་མང་	Baanjar བན་སྦྱར་	Banjar/Lomeywog
Tsamang རྩ་མང་	Baanjar བན་སྦྱར་	Banjar/Lungtakpa
Tsamang རྩ་མང་	Baanjar བན་སྦྱར་	Banjar/Merbang
Tsamang རྩ་མང་	Baanjar བན་སྦྱར་	Banjar/Murdumba
Tsamang རྩ་མང་	Baanjar བན་སྦྱར་	Banjar/Nyaka
Tsamang རྩ་མང་	Baanjar བན་སྦྱར་	Banjar/Pendenling
Tsamang རྩ་མང་	Baanjar བན་སྦྱར་	Banjar/Phuntsholing
Tsamang རྩ་མང་	Baanjar བན་སྦྱར་	Banjar/Rinzintakpa
Tsamang རྩ་མང་	Baanjar བན་སྦྱར་	Banjar/Samtenling
Tsamang རྩ་མང་	Baanjar བན་སྦྱར་	Banjar/Sangpoling
Tsamang རྩ་མང་	Baanjar བན་སྦྱར་	Banjar/Sisipang
Tsamang རྩ་མང་	Baanjar བན་སྦྱར་	Banjar/Taling
Tsamang རྩ་མང་	Baanjar བན་སྦྱར་	Banjar/Tashicholing
Tsamang རྩ་མང་	Baanjar བན་སྦྱར་	Banjar/Tashiling
Tsamang རྩ་མང་	Baanjar བན་སྦྱར་	Banjar/Umling
Tsamang རྩ་མང་	Baanjar བན་སྦྱར་	Banjar/Wachentakpa
Tsamang རྩ་མང་	Baanjar བན་སྦྱར་	Banjar/Yaloshing
Tsamang རྩ་མང་	Baanjar བན་སྦྱར་	Tokari/Draktangkhar
Tsamang རྩ་མང་	Thuenmong Tokari མཐུན་མོང་_ཏོ་ཀ་རི་	Tokari
Tsamang རྩ་མང་	Thuenmong Tokari མཐུན་མོང་_ཏོ་ཀ་རི་	Tokari/Artang
Tsamang རྩ་མང་	Thuenmong Tokari མཐུན་མོང་_ཏོ་ཀ་རི་	Tokari/Bangdrabi
Tsamang རྩ་མང་	Thuenmong Tokari མཐུན་མོང་_ཏོ་ཀ་རི་	Tokari/Chadongbi
Tsamang རྩ་མང་	Thuenmong Tokari མཐུན་མོང་_ཏོ་ཀ་རི་	Tokari/Chukiduwa
Tsamang རྩ་མང་	Thuenmong Tokari མཐུན་མོང་_ཏོ་ཀ་རི་	Tokari/Darchen
Tsamang རྩ་མང་	Thuenmong Tokari མཐུན་མོང་_ཏོ་ཀ་རི་	Tokari/Debang
Tsamang རྩ་མང་	Thuenmong Tokari མཐུན་མོང་_ཏོ་ཀ་རི་	Tokari/Debang
Tsamang རྩ་མང་	Thuenmong Tokari མཐུན་མོང་_ཏོ་ཀ་རི་	Tokari/Gensingnyesa
Tsamang རྩ་མང་	Thuenmong Tokari མཐུན་མོང་_ཏོ་ཀ་རི་	Tokari/Goenpa
Tsamang རྩ་མང་	Thuenmong Tokari མཐུན་མོང་_ཏོ་ཀ་རི་	Tokari/Golibi
Tsamang རྩ་མང་	Thuenmong Tokari མཐུན་མོང་_ཏོ་ཀ་རི་	Tokari/Kolokbi
Tsamang རྩ་མང་	Thuenmong Tokari མཐུན་མོང་_ཏོ་ཀ་རི་	Tokari/Leochung
Tsamang རྩ་མང་	Thuenmong Tokari མཐུན་མོང་_ཏོ་ཀ་རི་	Tokari/Lhadrang
Tsamang རྩ་མང་	Thuenmong Tokari མཐུན་མོང་_ཏོ་ཀ་རི་	Tokari/Mutigang
Tsamang རྩ་མང་	Thuenmong Tokari མཐུན་མོང་_ཏོ་ཀ་རི་	Tokari/Nakiduwa
Tsamang རྩ་མང་	Thuenmong Tokari མཐུན་མོང་_ཏོ་ཀ་རི་	Tokari/Nambucha
Tsamang རྩ་མང་	Thuenmong Tokari མཐུན་མོང་_ཏོ་ཀ་རི་	Tokari/Pam
Tsamang རྩ་མང་	Thuenmong Tokari མཐུན་མོང་_ཏོ་ཀ་རི་	Tokari/Ralamey
Tsamang རྩ་མང་	Thuenmong Tokari མཐུན་མོང་_ཏོ་ཀ་རི་	Tokari/Shakhar
Tsamang རྩ་མང་	Thuenmong Tokari མཐུན་མོང་_ཏོ་ཀ་རི་	Tokari/Shokang
Tsamang རྩ་མང་	Thuenmong Tokari མཐུན་མོང་_ཏོ་ཀ་རི་	Tokari/Tabsina
Tsamang རྩ་མང་	Thuenmong Tokari མཐུན་མོང་_ཏོ་ཀ་རི་	Tokari/Tshiden
Tsamang རྩ་མང་	Thuenmong Tokari མཐུན་མོང་_ཏོ་ཀ་རི་	Tokari/Thowagang
Tsamang རྩ་མང་	Thuenmong Tokari མཐུན་མོང་_ཏོ་ཀ་རི་	Tokari/Thrachamey
Tsamang རྩ་མང་	Thuenmong Tokari མཐུན་མོང་_ཏོ་ཀ་རི་	Tokari/Tsangtsa
Tsamang རྩ་མང་	Thuenmong Tokari མཐུན་མོང་_ཏོ་ཀ་རི་	Tokari/Tshendentsawa
Tsamang རྩ་མང་	Thuenmong Tokari མཐུན་མོང་_ཏོ་ཀ་རི་	Tokari/Umling
Tsamang རྩ་མང་	Thuenmong Tokari མཐུན་མོང་_ཏོ་ཀ་རི་	Tokari/Yedhap
Tsamang རྩ་མང་	Thuenmong Tokari མཐུན་མོང་_ཏོ་ཀ་རི་	Tokari/Augungna
Tsamang རྩ་མང་	Thuenmong Tokari མཐུན་མོང་_ཏོ་ཀ་རི་	Tokari/Bumpatakpa
Tsamang རྩ་མང་	Thuenmong Tokari མཐུན་མོང་_ཏོ་ཀ་རི་	Tokari/Chumetakpa
Tsamang རྩ་མང་	Thuenmong Tokari མཐུན་མོང་_ཏོ་ཀ་རི་	Tokari/Dekigang
Tsamang རྩ་མང་	Thuenmong Tokari མཐུན་མོང་_ཏོ་ཀ་རི་	Tokari/Denchen
Tsamang རྩ་མང་	Thuenmong Tokari མཐུན་མོང་_ཏོ་ཀ་རི་	Tokari/Brengpajab
Tsamang རྩ་མང་	Thuenmong Tokari མཐུན་མོང་_ཏོ་ཀ་རི་	Tokari/Duwashing
Tsamang རྩ་མང་	Thuenmong Tokari མཐུན་མོང་_ཏོ་ཀ་རི་	Tokari/Jalamwog
Tsamang རྩ་མང་	Thuenmong Tokari མཐུན་མོང་_ཏོ་ཀ་རི་	Tokari/Jewashing
Tsamang རྩ་མང་	Thuenmong Tokari མཐུན་མོང་_ཏོ་ཀ་རི་	Tokari/Labi
Tsamang རྩ་མང་	Thuenmong Tokari མཐུན་མོང་_ཏོ་ཀ་རི་	Tokari/Nakchen
Tsamang རྩ་མང་	Thuenmong Tokari མཐུན་མོང་_ཏོ་ཀ་རི་	Tokari/Nakphung
Tsamang རྩ་མང་	Thuenmong Tokari མཐུན་མོང་_ཏོ་ཀ་རི་	Tokari/Sangcha
Tsamang རྩ་མང་	Thuenmong Tokari མཐུན་མོང་_ཏོ་ཀ་རི་	Tokari/Shingmartakpa
Tsamang རྩ་མང་	Thuenmong Tokari མཐུན་མོང་_ཏོ་ཀ་རི་	Tokari/Shojabi
Tsamang རྩ་མང་	Thuenmong Tokari མཐུན་མོང་_ཏོ་ཀ་རི་	Tokari/Shungpashing
Tsamang རྩ་མང་	Thuenmong Tokari མཐུན་མོང་_ཏོ་ཀ་རི་	Tokari/Singyetsawa
Tsamang རྩ་མང་	Thuenmong Tokari མཐུན་མོང་_ཏོ་ཀ་རི་	Tokari/Sogangguto
Tsamang རྩ་མང་	Thuenmong Tokari མཐུན་མོང་_ཏོ་ཀ་རི་	Tokari/Sogangwog
Tsamang རྩ་མང་	Thuenmong Tokari མཐུན་མོང་_ཏོ་ཀ་རི་	Tokari/Sumthuen
Tsamang རྩ་མང་	Thuenmong Tokari མཐུན་མོང་_ཏོ་ཀ་རི་	Tokari/Tashiling
Tsamang རྩ་མང་	Thuenmong Tokari མཐུན་མོང་_ཏོ་ཀ་རི་	Tokari/Thekarla
Tsamang རྩ་མང་	Thuenmong Tokari མཐུན་མོང་_ཏོ་ཀ་རི་	Tokari/Thowa
Tsamang རྩ་མང་	Thuenmong Tokari མཐུན་མོང་_ཏོ་ཀ་རི་	Tokari/Wodang
Tsamang རྩ་མང་	Thuenmong Tokari མཐུན་མོང་_ཏོ་ཀ་རི་	Tokari/Woktapka
Tsamang རྩ་མང་	Thuenmong Tokari མཐུན་མོང་_ཏོ་ཀ་རི་	Tokari/Zampatakpa
Tsamang རྩ་མང་	Drangmaling Nanggor དྲངམ་གླིང་_ནང་སྒོར་	Drangmaling
Tsamang རྩ་མང་	Drangmaling Nanggor དྲངམ་གླིང་_ནང་སྒོར་	Drangmaling/Nanggar
Tsamang རྩ་མང་	Drangmaling Nanggor དྲངམ་གླིང་_ནང་སྒོར་	Drangmaling/Sarpashing
Tsamang རྩ་མང་	Drangmaling Nanggor དྲངམ་གླིང་_ནང་སྒོར་	Drangmaling/Sep
Tsamang རྩ་མང་	Drangmaling Nanggor དྲངམ་གླིང་_ནང་སྒོར་	Drangmaling/Tshowog
Tsamang རྩ་མང་	Drangmaling Nanggor དྲངམ་གླིང་_ནང་སྒོར་	Drangmaling/Artogchen

=== Paro District ===
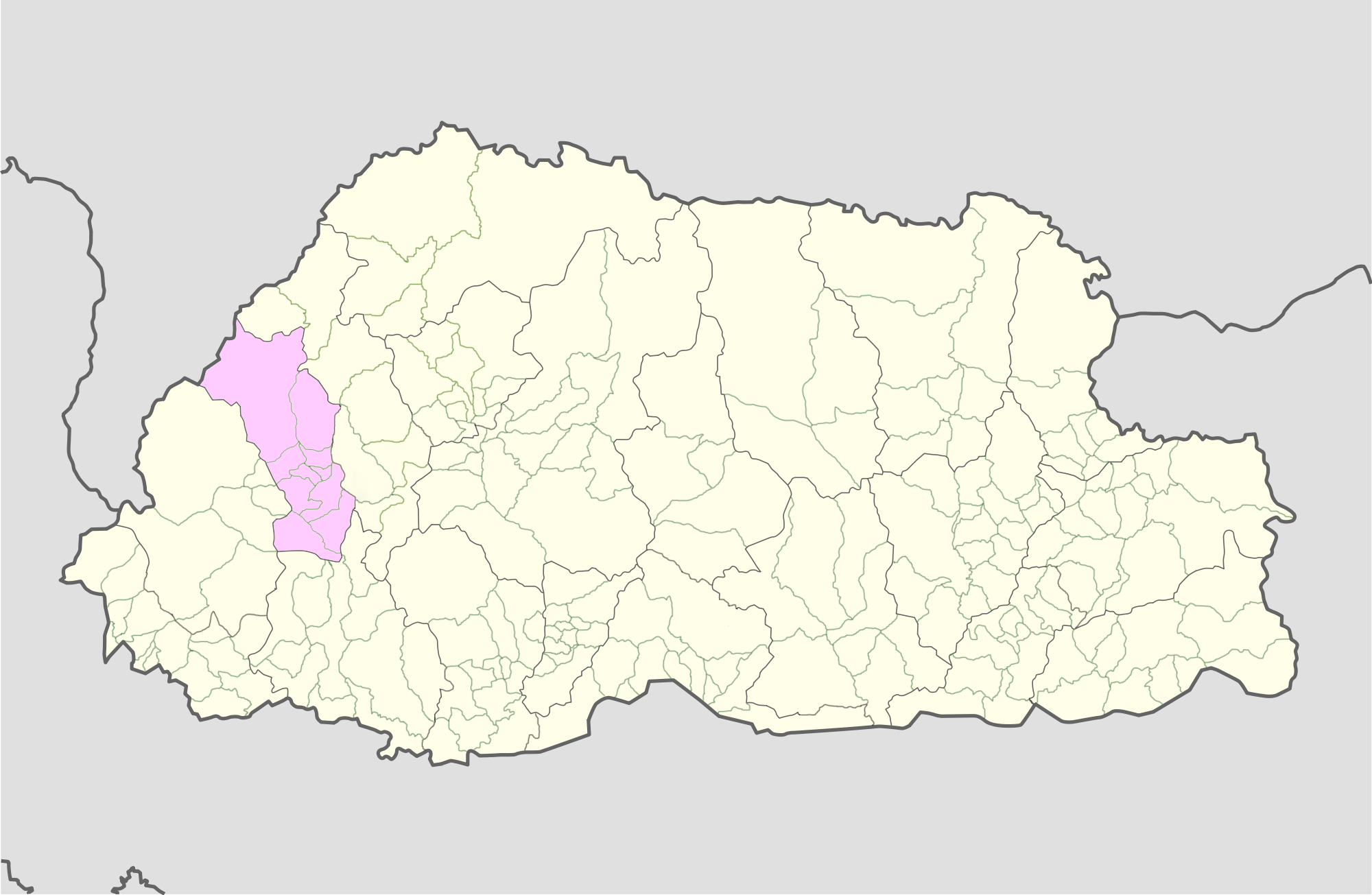
Paro District

Gewog	Chiwog	Village
Dokar རྡོ་དཀར་	Tenchhekha Tsiphoog བསྟན་ཆེ་ཁ་_རྕིས་ཕུག་	Tenchhekha
Dokar རྡོ་དཀར་	Tenchhekha Tsiphoog བསྟན་ཆེ་ཁ་_རྕིས་ཕུག་	Tsiphoog
Dokar རྡོ་དཀར་	Goensakha Phuchhekha དགོན་ས་ཁ་_ཕུ་ཆེ་ཁ་	Chhuzom
Dokar རྡོ་དཀར་	Goensakha Phuchhekha དགོན་ས་ཁ་_ཕུ་ཆེ་ཁ་	Phuchhekha
Dokar རྡོ་དཀར་	Goensakha Phuchhekha དགོན་ས་ཁ་_ཕུ་ཆེ་ཁ་	Tsinakha
Dokar རྡོ་དཀར་	Goensakha Phuchhekha དགོན་ས་ཁ་_ཕུ་ཆེ་ཁ་	Goensakha
Dokar རྡོ་དཀར་	Goensakha Phuchhekha དགོན་ས་ཁ་_ཕུ་ཆེ་ཁ་	Tshoelgang
Dokar རྡོ་དཀར་	Goensakha Phuchhekha དགོན་ས་ཁ་_ཕུ་ཆེ་ཁ་	Uesakha
Dokar རྡོ་དཀར་	Mendrel Uesuna མན་དྲལ་_དབུས་སུ་ན་	Uesuna
Dokar རྡོ་དཀར་	Mendrel Uesuna མན་དྲལ་_དབུས་སུ་ན་	Mendrel Jabkha
Dokar རྡོ་དཀར་	Mendrel Uesuna མན་དྲལ་_དབུས་སུ་ན་	Tamchoegang
Dokar རྡོ་དཀར་	Dawakha Tshongkha ཟླ་བ་ཁ་_ཚོང་ཁ་	Dawakha
Dokar རྡོ་དཀར་	Dawakha Tshongkha ཟླ་བ་ཁ་_ཚོང་ཁ་	Togtokha
Dokar རྡོ་དཀར་	Dawakha Tshongkha ཟླ་བ་ཁ་_ཚོང་ཁ་	Langmikha
Dokar རྡོ་དཀར་	Dawakha Tshongkha ཟླ་བ་ཁ་_ཚོང་ཁ་	Jabisa
Dokar རྡོ་དཀར་	Dawakha Tshongkha ཟླ་བ་ཁ་_ཚོང་ཁ་	Tshongkha
Dokar རྡོ་དཀར་	Khamdraag Sali ཁམས་བྲག་_ས་ལི་	Bangkha
Dokar རྡོ་དཀར་	Khamdraag Sali ཁམས་བྲག་_ས་ལི་	Khamdraag
Dokar རྡོ་དཀར་	Khamdraag Sali ཁམས་བྲག་_ས་ལི་	Khamdraag-gang
Dokar རྡོ་དཀར་	Khamdraag Sali ཁམས་བྲག་_ས་ལི་	Tashigang
Dokar རྡོ་དཀར་	Khamdraag Sali ཁམས་བྲག་_ས་ལི་	Toepchugang
Dokar རྡོ་དཀར་	Khamdraag Sali ཁམས་བྲག་_ས་ལི་	Dzongang
Dokar རྡོ་དཀར་	Khamdraag Sali ཁམས་བྲག་_ས་ལི་	Lagel
Dokar རྡོ་དཀར་	Khamdraag Sali ཁམས་བྲག་_ས་ལི་	Dala
Dokar རྡོ་དཀར་	Khamdraag Sali ཁམས་བྲག་_ས་ལི་	Gagay
Dokar རྡོ་དཀར་	Khamdraag Sali ཁམས་བྲག་_ས་ལི་	Gayjo
Dokar རྡོ་དཀར་	Khamdraag Sali ཁམས་བྲག་_ས་ལི་	Sali
Dokar རྡོ་དཀར་	Khamdraag Sali ཁམས་བྲག་_ས་ལི་	Silu Goenpa
Dokar རྡོ་དཀར་	Khamdraag Sali ཁམས་བྲག་_ས་ལི་	Tango
Dopshari རྡོབ་ཤར་རི་	Duezhi Jipa དུས་གཞི་_སྦྱིས་པ་	Duezhi
Dopshari རྡོབ་ཤར་རི་	Duezhi Jipa དུས་གཞི་_སྦྱིས་པ་	Jipa
Dopshari རྡོབ་ཤར་རི་	Duezhi Jipa དུས་གཞི་_སྦྱིས་པ་	Batsekha
Dopshari རྡོབ་ཤར་རི་	Duezhi Jipa དུས་གཞི་_སྦྱིས་པ་	Dorokha
Dopshari རྡོབ་ཤར་རི་	Duezhi Jipa དུས་གཞི་_སྦྱིས་པ་	Jangonang
Dopshari རྡོབ་ཤར་རི་	Duezhi Jipa དུས་གཞི་_སྦྱིས་པ་	Jangsa Gongm
Dopshari རྡོབ་ཤར་རི་	Duezhi Jipa དུས་གཞི་_སྦྱིས་པ་	Jangsana
Dopshari རྡོབ་ཤར་རི་	Duezhi Jipa དུས་གཞི་_སྦྱིས་པ་	Khamshingwog
Dopshari རྡོབ་ཤར་རི་	Duezhi Jipa དུས་གཞི་_སྦྱིས་པ་	Khimsarp
Dopshari རྡོབ་ཤར་རི་	Duezhi Jipa དུས་གཞི་_སྦྱིས་པ་	Liwog
Dopshari རྡོབ་ཤར་རི་	Kempa Kuduphoog སྐྱེམ་པ་_སྐུ་འདུ་ཕུག་	Kempa
Dopshari རྡོབ་ཤར་རི་	Kempa Kuduphoog སྐྱེམ་པ་_སྐུ་འདུ་ཕུག་	Bamizhikha
Dopshari རྡོབ་ཤར་རི་	Kempa Kuduphoog སྐྱེམ་པ་_སྐུ་འདུ་ཕུག་	Changyoelkha
Dopshari རྡོབ་ཤར་རི་	Kempa Kuduphoog སྐྱེམ་པ་_སྐུ་འདུ་ཕུག་	Delikha
Dopshari རྡོབ་ཤར་རི་	Kempa Kuduphoog སྐྱེམ་པ་_སྐུ་འདུ་ཕུག་	Jangsuna
Dopshari རྡོབ་ཤར་རི་	Kempa Kuduphoog སྐྱེམ་པ་_སྐུ་འདུ་ཕུག་	Jombenang
Dopshari རྡོབ་ཤར་རི་	Kempa Kuduphoog སྐྱེམ་པ་_སྐུ་འདུ་ཕུག་	Khimsarbu
Dopshari རྡོབ་ཤར་རི་	Kempa Kuduphoog སྐྱེམ་པ་_སྐུ་འདུ་ཕུག་	Phalom
Dopshari རྡོབ་ཤར་རི་	Kempa Kuduphoog སྐྱེམ་པ་_སྐུ་འདུ་ཕུག་	Phenshing Zhikha
Dopshari རྡོབ་ཤར་རི་	Kempa Kuduphoog སྐྱེམ་པ་_སྐུ་འདུ་ཕུག་	Pidekha
Dopshari རྡོབ་ཤར་རི་	Kempa Kuduphoog སྐྱེམ་པ་_སྐུ་འདུ་ཕུག་	Rimdotshelkha
Dopshari རྡོབ་ཤར་རི་	Kempa Kuduphoog སྐྱེམ་པ་_སྐུ་འདུ་ཕུག་	Tshozarkha
Dopshari རྡོབ་ཤར་རི་	Kempa Kuduphoog སྐྱེམ་པ་_སྐུ་འདུ་ཕུག་	Zharikha
Dopshari རྡོབ་ཤར་རི་	Kempa Kuduphoog སྐྱེམ་པ་_སྐུ་འདུ་ཕུག་	Kuduphoog
Dopshari རྡོབ་ཤར་རི་	Kempa Kuduphoog སྐྱེམ་པ་_སྐུ་འདུ་ཕུག་	Kuduphoog Kotsha
Dopshari རྡོབ་ཤར་རི་	Kempa Kuduphoog སྐྱེམ་པ་_སྐུ་འདུ་ཕུག་	Rimdo Kempa
Dopshari རྡོབ་ཤར་རི་	Rinchhending Sharri རིན་ཆེན་ལྡིང་_ཤར་རི་	Buelchukha
Dopshari རྡོབ་ཤར་རི་	Rinchhending Sharri རིན་ཆེན་ལྡིང་_ཤར་རི་	Damzhi
Dopshari རྡོབ་ཤར་རི་	Rinchhending Sharri རིན་ཆེན་ལྡིང་_ཤར་རི་	Hingzhiwog
Dopshari རྡོབ་ཤར་རི་	Rinchhending Sharri རིན་ཆེན་ལྡིང་_ཤར་རི་	Jangonang
Dopshari རྡོབ་ཤར་རི་	Rinchhending Sharri རིན་ཆེན་ལྡིང་_ཤར་རི་	Jangsakha
Dopshari རྡོབ་ཤར་རི་	Rinchhending Sharri རིན་ཆེན་ལྡིང་_ཤར་རི་	Nazhikha
Dopshari རྡོབ་ཤར་རི་	Rinchhending Sharri རིན་ཆེན་ལྡིང་_ཤར་རི་	Ramnang
Dopshari རྡོབ་ཤར་རི་	Rinchhending Sharri རིན་ཆེན་ལྡིང་_ཤར་རི་	Richhukha
Dopshari རྡོབ་ཤར་རི་	Rinchhending Sharri རིན་ཆེན་ལྡིང་_ཤར་རི་	Rijoog
Dopshari རྡོབ་ཤར་རི་	Rinchhending Sharri རིན་ཆེན་ལྡིང་_ཤར་རི་	Rijoogkha
Dopshari རྡོབ་ཤར་རི་	Rinchhending Sharri རིན་ཆེན་ལྡིང་_ཤར་རི་	Rotogang
Dopshari རྡོབ་ཤར་རི་	Rinchhending Sharri རིན་ཆེན་ལྡིང་_ཤར་རི་	Tadingkha
Dopshari རྡོབ་ཤར་རི་	Rinchhending Sharri རིན་ཆེན་ལྡིང་_ཤར་རི་	Togtokha
Dopshari རྡོབ་ཤར་རི་	Rinchhending Sharri རིན་ཆེན་ལྡིང་_ཤར་རི་	Bara
Dopshari རྡོབ་ཤར་རི་	Rinchhending Sharri རིན་ཆེན་ལྡིང་_ཤར་རི་	Chimakha
Dopshari རྡོབ་ཤར་རི་	Rinchhending Sharri རིན་ཆེན་ལྡིང་_ཤར་རི་	Rijoog Tsima
Dopshari རྡོབ་ཤར་རི་	Rinchhending Sharri རིན་ཆེན་ལྡིང་_ཤར་རི་	Richhendeling
Dopshari རྡོབ་ཤར་རི་	Rinchhending Sharri རིན་ཆེན་ལྡིང་_ཤར་རི་	Samarkha
Dopshari རྡོབ་ཤར་རི་	Rinchhending Sharri རིན་ཆེན་ལྡིང་_ཤར་རི་	Zhikha
Dopshari རྡོབ་ཤར་རི་	Jangsa Jooka བྱང་ས་_འཇུ་ཀ་	Jangsa
Dopshari རྡོབ་ཤར་རི་	Jangsa Jooka བྱང་ས་_འཇུ་ཀ་	Dangribug
Dopshari རྡོབ་ཤར་རི་	Jangsa Jooka བྱང་ས་_འཇུ་ཀ་	Dragbeylo
Dopshari རྡོབ་ཤར་རི་	Jangsa Jooka བྱང་ས་_འཇུ་ཀ་	Jagchukha
Dopshari རྡོབ་ཤར་རི་	Jangsa Jooka བྱང་ས་_འཇུ་ཀ་	Jagchutsekha
Dopshari རྡོབ་ཤར་རི་	Jangsa Jooka བྱང་ས་_འཇུ་ཀ་	Karshitsha
Dopshari རྡོབ་ཤར་རི་	Jangsa Jooka བྱང་ས་_འཇུ་ཀ་	Nazhikha
Dopshari རྡོབ་ཤར་རི་	Jangsa Jooka བྱང་ས་_འཇུ་ཀ་	Jugang Thagchukha
Dopshari རྡོབ་ཤར་རི་	Jangsa Jooka བྱང་ས་_འཇུ་ཀ་	Jooka
Dopshari རྡོབ་ཤར་རི་	Jangsa Jooka བྱང་ས་_འཇུ་ཀ་	Jooka Gom
Dopshari རྡོབ་ཤར་རི་	Jangsa Jooka བྱང་ས་_འཇུ་ཀ་	Khimsabu
Dopshari རྡོབ་ཤར་རི་	Jangsa Jooka བྱང་ས་_འཇུ་ཀ་	Shangzhikha
Dopshari རྡོབ་ཤར་རི་	Jangsa Jooka བྱང་ས་_འཇུ་ཀ་	Jooka Thangkha
Dopshari རྡོབ་ཤར་རི་	Jangsa Jooka བྱང་ས་_འཇུ་ཀ་	Thangkana
Dopshari རྡོབ་ཤར་རི་	Jizhigang སྦྱིས་གཞི་སྒང་	Damchenang
Dopshari རྡོབ་ཤར་རི་	Jizhigang སྦྱིས་གཞི་སྒང་	Jizhigang
Dopshari རྡོབ་ཤར་རི་	Jizhigang སྦྱིས་གཞི་སྒང་	Sephu Jizhigang
Doteng རྡོ་སྟེང་	Phooshar ཕུ་ཤར་	Phooshar
Doteng རྡོ་སྟེང་	Phooshar ཕུ་ཤར་	Chingdued Goenpa
Doteng རྡོ་སྟེང་	Aatsho Phunoob ཨ་ཚོ་_ཕུ་ནུབ་	Aa-tsho
Doteng རྡོ་སྟེང་	Aatsho Phunoob ཨ་ཚོ་_ཕུ་ནུབ་	Phunoob
Doteng རྡོ་སྟེང་	Chhubar ཆུ་བར་	Chhubar
Doteng རྡོ་སྟེང་	Jabji Loogchhoed བྱག་སྦྱིས་_ལུག་མཆོད་	Jabji
Doteng རྡོ་སྟེང་	Jabji Loogchhoed བྱག་སྦྱིས་_ལུག་མཆོད་	Loogchhoed
Doteng རྡོ་སྟེང་	Joogar Pachhu མཇུག་སྒར་_སྤ་ཆུ་	Joogar
Doteng རྡོ་སྟེང་	Joogar Pachhu མཇུག་སྒར་_སྤ་ཆུ་	Joogar Tselkha
Doteng རྡོ་སྟེང་	Joogar Pachhu མཇུག་སྒར་_སྤ་ཆུ་	Pachhu
Hungrel ཧཱུྃ་རལ་	Gaupel དགའུ་སྤལ་	Donagmo
Hungrel ཧཱུྃ་རལ་	Gaupel དགའུ་སྤལ་	Nangshikha (Hungrel)
Hungrel ཧཱུྃ་རལ་	Gaupel དགའུ་སྤལ་	Drukgyeling
Hungrel ཧཱུྃ་རལ་	Gaupel དགའུ་སྤལ་	Changsima
Hungrel ཧཱུྃ་རལ་	Gaupel དགའུ་སྤལ་	Gaupel
Hungrel ཧཱུྃ་རལ་	Hoongrelkha Jangsarbu ཧཱུྃ་རལ་ཁ་_བྱང་གསར་བུ་	Hoongrelkha
Hungrel ཧཱུྃ་རལ་	Hoongrelkha Jangsarbu ཧཱུྃ་རལ་ཁ་_བྱང་གསར་བུ་	Changkhor
Hungrel ཧཱུྃ་རལ་	Hoongrelkha Jangsarbu ཧཱུྃ་རལ་ཁ་_བྱང་གསར་བུ་	Jangmedna
Hungrel ཧཱུྃ་རལ་	Hoongrelkha Jangsarbu ཧཱུྃ་རལ་ཁ་_བྱང་གསར་བུ་	Chukhozakha
Hungrel ཧཱུྃ་རལ་	Hoongrelkha Jangsarbu ཧཱུྃ་རལ་ཁ་_བྱང་གསར་བུ་	Nyangmedzampa
Hungrel ཧཱུྃ་རལ་	Hoongrelkha Jangsarbu ཧཱུྃ་རལ་ཁ་_བྱང་གསར་བུ་	Jangsarbu
Hungrel ཧཱུྃ་རལ་	Loongchhungna ལུང་ཆུང་ན་	Loongchhungna
Hungrel ཧཱུྃ་རལ་	Loongchhungna ལུང་ཆུང་ན་	Zore Goenpa
Hungrel ཧཱུྃ་རལ་	Loongchhungna ལུང་ཆུང་ན་	Tshongdue
Hungrel ཧཱུྃ་རལ་	Chhubjagkha ཆུ་བྱག་ཁ་	Chhubjagkha
Hungrel ཧཱུྃ་རལ་	Goenkha དགོན་ཁ་	Goenkha
Lamgong ལམ་གོང་	Chhukha ཆུ་ཁ་	Chhukha
Lamgong ལམ་གོང་	Tsendonang བཙན་དོ་ནང་	Tsendanang
Lamgong ལམ་གོང་	Tsendonang བཙན་དོ་ནང་	Tsendonang
Lamgong ལམ་གོང་	Tsendonang བཙན་དོ་ནང་	Tsenthang
Lamgong ལམ་གོང་	Tsendonang བཙན་དོ་ནང་	Bartshik
Lamgong ལམ་གོང་	Tsendonang བཙན་དོ་ནང་	Dokha
Lamgong ལམ་གོང་	Tsendonang བཙན་དོ་ནང་	Gyedkha
Lamgong ལམ་གོང་	Tsendonang བཙན་དོ་ནང་	Geptsha
Lamgong ལམ་གོང་	Tsendonang བཙན་དོ་ནང་	Sharhikha
Lamgong ལམ་གོང་	Tsendonang བཙན་དོ་ནང་	Tsenthang Thangtoed
Lamgong ལམ་གོང་	Tsendonang བཙན་དོ་ནང་	Tsenthang Toed
Lamgong ལམ་གོང་	Jagarthang རྒྱ་གར་ཐང་	Darkhang
Lamgong ལམ་གོང་	Jagarthang རྒྱ་གར་ཐང་	Jagathang Maed
Lamgong ལམ་གོང་	Jagarthang རྒྱ་གར་ཐང་	Jagathang Toed
Lamgong ལམ་གོང་	Jagarthang རྒྱ་གར་ཐང་	Gedda Zam
Lamgong ལམ་གོང་	Jagarthang རྒྱ་གར་ཐང་	Jagar Thangmaed
Lamgong ལམ་གོང་	Jagarthang རྒྱ་གར་ཐང་	Sergang
Lamgong ལམ་གོང་	Gangjoog Kyidchhu སྒང་མཇུག་_སྐྱིད་ཆུ་	Kyidchhu
Lamgong ལམ་གོང་	Gangjoog Kyidchhu སྒང་མཇུག་_སྐྱིད་ཆུ་	Gangjoog
Lamgong ལམ་གོང་	Ngopa Shomo སྔོ་པ་_ཤོ་མོ་	Ngopa
Lamgong ལམ་གོང་	Ngopa Shomo སྔོ་པ་_ཤོ་མོ་	Shomo
Lamgong ལམ་གོང་	Nubri ནུ་བྲིས་	Nubri
Lamgong ལམ་གོང་	Nubri ནུ་བྲིས་	Soe
Lamgong ལམ་གོང་	Nubri ནུ་བྲིས་	Soe Yaksa
Lungnyi ལུང་གཉིས་	Naemjog གནསམ་འབྱོག་	Naemjog
Lungnyi ལུང་གཉིས་	Naemjog གནསམ་འབྱོག་	Bedo
Lungnyi ལུང་གཉིས་	Naemjog གནསམ་འབྱོག་	Bedotshekha
Lungnyi ལུང་གཉིས་	Naemjog གནསམ་འབྱོག་	Chuthagkha
Lungnyi ལུང་གཉིས་	Naemjog གནསམ་འབྱོག་	Dobu
Lungnyi ལུང་གཉིས་	Naemjog གནསམ་འབྱོག་	Drangja Goenpa
Lungnyi ལུང་གཉིས་	Naemjog གནསམ་འབྱོག་	Giutsig
Lungnyi ལུང་གཉིས་	Naemjog གནསམ་འབྱོག་	Jangka
Lungnyi ལུང་གཉིས་	Naemjog གནསམ་འབྱོག་	Jangka Tsekha
Lungnyi ལུང་གཉིས་	Naemjog གནསམ་འབྱོག་	Jangsa
Lungnyi ལུང་གཉིས་	Naemjog གནསམ་འབྱོག་	Limchen
Lungnyi ལུང་གཉིས་	Naemjog གནསམ་འབྱོག་	Legchukha
Lungnyi ལུང་གཉིས་	Naemjog གནསམ་འབྱོག་	Mayukha
Lungnyi ལུང་གཉིས་	Naemjog གནསམ་འབྱོག་	Mekhu/Sikhu
Lungnyi ལུང་གཉིས་	Naemjog གནསམ་འབྱོག་	Nazhikha
Lungnyi ལུང་གཉིས་	Naemjog གནསམ་འབྱོག་	Poeri
Lungnyi ལུང་གཉིས་	Naemjog གནསམ་འབྱོག་	Rema
Lungnyi ལུང་གཉིས་	Naemjog གནསམ་འབྱོག་	Rimpoeri
Lungnyi ལུང་གཉིས་	Naemjog གནསམ་འབྱོག་	Riphakha
Lungnyi ལུང་གཉིས་	Naemjog གནསམ་འབྱོག་	Sima
Lungnyi ལུང་གཉིས་	Naemjog གནསམ་འབྱོག་	Thangkha
Lungnyi ལུང་གཉིས་	Naemjog གནསམ་འབྱོག་	Tshekha
Lungnyi ལུང་གཉིས་	Jieu Woochhu བྱིའུ་_འུ་ཆུ་	Jieu
Lungnyi ལུང་གཉིས་	Jieu Woochhu བྱིའུ་_འུ་ཆུ་	Bameynyikha
Lungnyi ལུང་གཉིས་	Jieu Woochhu བྱིའུ་_འུ་ཆུ་	Dardo
Lungnyi ལུང་གཉིས་	Jieu Woochhu བྱིའུ་_འུ་ཆུ་	Kilikha
Lungnyi ལུང་གཉིས་	Jieu Woochhu བྱིའུ་_འུ་ཆུ་	Dolepchen
Lungnyi ལུང་གཉིས་	Jieu Woochhu བྱིའུ་_འུ་ཆུ་	Sasa
Lungnyi ལུང་གཉིས་	Jieu Woochhu བྱིའུ་_འུ་ཆུ་	Tserinang
Lungnyi ལུང་གཉིས་	Jieu Woochhu བྱིའུ་_འུ་ཆུ་	Tshetekha
Lungnyi ལུང་གཉིས་	Jieu Woochhu བྱིའུ་_འུ་ཆུ་	Sharigyurwawog
Lungnyi ལུང་གཉིས་	Jieu Woochhu བྱིའུ་_འུ་ཆུ་	Sharijekema
Lungnyi ལུང་གཉིས་	Jieu Woochhu བྱིའུ་_འུ་ཆུ་	Shariling Shingtsa
Lungnyi ལུང་གཉིས་	Jieu Woochhu བྱིའུ་_འུ་ཆུ་	Menchu
Lungnyi ལུང་གཉིས་	Jieu Woochhu བྱིའུ་_འུ་ཆུ་	Potokha
Lungnyi ལུང་གཉིས་	Jieu Woochhu བྱིའུ་_འུ་ཆུ་	Shariyurwatakpa
Lungnyi ལུང་གཉིས་	Jieu Woochhu བྱིའུ་_འུ་ཆུ་	Sama
Lungnyi ལུང་གཉིས་	Jieu Woochhu བྱིའུ་_འུ་ཆུ་	Zhingchen
Lungnyi ལུང་གཉིས་	Jieu Woochhu བྱིའུ་_འུ་ཆུ་	Zhingchen Thangkha
Lungnyi ལུང་གཉིས་	Jieu Woochhu བྱིའུ་_འུ་ཆུ་	Zhogkukha
Lungnyi ལུང་གཉིས་	Jieu Woochhu བྱིའུ་_འུ་ཆུ་	Demcho
Lungnyi ལུང་གཉིས་	Jieu Woochhu བྱིའུ་_འུ་ཆུ་	Gaitsa
Lungnyi ལུང་གཉིས་	Jieu Woochhu བྱིའུ་_འུ་ཆུ་	Gangchujab
Lungnyi ལུང་གཉིས་	Jieu Woochhu བྱིའུ་_འུ་ཆུ་	Gangtokha
Lungnyi ལུང་གཉིས་	Jieu Woochhu བྱིའུ་_འུ་ཆུ་	Gartshangnang
Lungnyi ལུང་གཉིས་	Jieu Woochhu བྱིའུ་_འུ་ཆུ་	Janalungpa
Lungnyi ལུང་གཉིས་	Jieu Woochhu བྱིའུ་_འུ་ཆུ་	Jangchubtoe
Lungnyi ལུང་གཉིས་	Jieu Woochhu བྱིའུ་_འུ་ཆུ་	Jangka
Lungnyi ལུང་གཉིས་	Jieu Woochhu བྱིའུ་_འུ་ཆུ་	Jangkawogma
Lungnyi ལུང་གཉིས་	Jieu Woochhu བྱིའུ་_འུ་ཆུ་	Jagna
Lungnyi ལུང་གཉིས་	Jieu Woochhu བྱིའུ་_འུ་ཆུ་	Lungpathangkha
Lungnyi ལུང་གཉིས་	Jieu Woochhu བྱིའུ་_འུ་ཆུ་	Naktshangtsawa
Lungnyi ལུང་གཉིས་	Jieu Woochhu བྱིའུ་_འུ་ཆུ་	Omchunang
Lungnyi ལུང་གཉིས་	Jieu Woochhu བྱིའུ་_འུ་ཆུ་	Pumnang
Lungnyi ལུང་གཉིས་	Jieu Woochhu བྱིའུ་_འུ་ཆུ་	Rabsima
Lungnyi ལུང་གཉིས་	Jieu Woochhu བྱིའུ་_འུ་ཆུ་	Kenpalong
Lungnyi ལུང་གཉིས་	Jieu Woochhu བྱིའུ་_འུ་ཆུ་	Rhidima
Lungnyi ལུང་གཉིས་	Jieu Woochhu བྱིའུ་_འུ་ཆུ་	Woochhu Toed
Lungnyi ལུང་གཉིས་	Jieu Woochhu བྱིའུ་_འུ་ཆུ་	Woochhu Toed Ngo
Lungnyi ལུང་གཉིས་	Jieu Woochhu བྱིའུ་_འུ་ཆུ་	Tshangpa
Lungnyi ལུང་གཉིས་	Jieu Woochhu བྱིའུ་_འུ་ཆུ་	Tshelgona
Lungnyi ལུང་གཉིས་	Jieu Woochhu བྱིའུ་_འུ་ཆུ་	Zhelngo Wogma
Lungnyi ལུང་གཉིས་	Jieu Woochhu བྱིའུ་_འུ་ཆུ་	Zhelngo
Lungnyi ལུང་གཉིས་	Jieu Woochhu བྱིའུ་_འུ་ཆུ་	Woochhu
Lungnyi ལུང་གཉིས་	Dzongdraag Gadraag རྫོང་བྲག་_དགའ་བྲག་	Choetenkha
Lungnyi ལུང་གཉིས་	Dzongdraag Gadraag རྫོང་བྲག་_དགའ་བྲག་	Tashigang
Lungnyi ལུང་གཉིས་	Dzongdraag Gadraag རྫོང་བྲག་_དགའ་བྲག་	Para
Lungnyi ལུང་གཉིས་	Dzongdraag Gadraag རྫོང་བྲག་_དགའ་བྲག་	Darchu
Lungnyi ལུང་གཉིས་	Dzongdraag Gadraag རྫོང་བྲག་_དགའ་བྲག་	Dramato
Lungnyi ལུང་གཉིས་	Dzongdraag Gadraag རྫོང་བྲག་_དགའ་བྲག་	Jangsarbu
Lungnyi ལུང་གཉིས་	Dzongdraag Gadraag རྫོང་བྲག་_དགའ་བྲག་	Bara
Lungnyi ལུང་གཉིས་	Dzongdraag Gadraag རྫོང་བྲག་_དགའ་བྲག་	Kazhi
Lungnyi ལུང་གཉིས་	Dzongdraag Gadraag རྫོང་བྲག་_དགའ་བྲག་	Lhakhangokha
Lungnyi ལུང་གཉིས་	Dzongdraag Gadraag རྫོང་བྲག་_དགའ་བྲག་	Shingkalachu
Lungnyi ལུང་གཉིས་	Dzongdraag Gadraag རྫོང་བྲག་_དགའ་བྲག་	Toechochu
Lungnyi ལུང་གཉིས་	Dzongdraag Gadraag རྫོང་བྲག་_དགའ་བྲག་	Toechoelu
Lungnyi ལུང་གཉིས་	Dzongdraag Gadraag རྫོང་བྲག་_དགའ་བྲག་	Dzongdraagkha
Lungnyi ལུང་གཉིས་	Dzongdraag Gadraag རྫོང་བྲག་_དགའ་བྲག་	Achilakha
Lungnyi ལུང་གཉིས་	Dzongdraag Gadraag རྫོང་བྲག་_དགའ་བྲག་	Tshaphelo
Lungnyi ལུང་གཉིས་	Dzongdraag Gadraag རྫོང་བྲག་_དགའ་བྲག་	Gadraagna
Lungnyi ལུང་གཉིས་	Dzongdraag Gadraag རྫོང་བྲག་_དགའ་བྲག་	Achilakha
Lungnyi ལུང་གཉིས་	Dzongdraag Gadraag རྫོང་བྲག་_དགའ་བྲག་	Bakhimnang
Lungnyi ལུང་གཉིས་	Dzongdraag Gadraag རྫོང་བྲག་_དགའ་བྲག་	Dolepchen
Lungnyi ལུང་གཉིས་	Dzongdraag Gadraag རྫོང་བྲག་_དགའ་བྲག་	Draglu
Lungnyi ལུང་གཉིས་	Dzongdraag Gadraag རྫོང་བྲག་_དགའ་བྲག་	Gonyim
Lungnyi ལུང་གཉིས་	Dzongdraag Gadraag རྫོང་བྲག་_དགའ་བྲག་	Jangtoedkha
Lungnyi ལུང་གཉིས་	Dzongdraag Gadraag རྫོང་བྲག་_དགའ་བྲག་	Lambatoed
Lungnyi ལུང་གཉིས་	Dzongdraag Gadraag རྫོང་བྲག་_དགའ་བྲག་	Serikha
Lungnyi ལུང་གཉིས་	Dzongdraag Gadraag རྫོང་བྲག་_དགའ་བྲག་	Talung
Lungnyi ལུང་གཉིས་	Dzongdraag Gadraag རྫོང་བྲག་_དགའ་བྲག་	Tshaphelo
Lungnyi ལུང་གཉིས་	Dzongdraag Gadraag རྫོང་བྲག་_དགའ་བྲག་	Gadradazhikha
Lungnyi ལུང་གཉིས་	Dzongdraag Gadraag རྫོང་བྲག་_དགའ་བྲག་	Pepchu
Lungnyi ལུང་གཉིས་	Baangdey བང་སྡེ་	Baangdey
Lungnyi ལུང་གཉིས་	Pangbisa སྤང་སྦིས་ས་	Pangbisa
Lungnyi ལུང་གཉིས་	Pangbisa སྤང་སྦིས་ས་	Atsha
Lungnyi ལུང་གཉིས་	Pangbisa སྤང་སྦིས་ས་	Dzongkha
Lungnyi ལུང་གཉིས་	Pangbisa སྤང་སྦིས་ས་	Jungsikha
Lungnyi ལུང་གཉིས་	Pangbisa སྤང་སྦིས་ས་	Jangminang
Lungnyi ལུང་གཉིས་	Pangbisa སྤང་སྦིས་ས་	Jangsekha
Lungnyi ལུང་གཉིས་	Pangbisa སྤང་སྦིས་ས་	Jangsipetsa
Lungnyi ལུང་གཉིས་	Pangbisa སྤང་སྦིས་ས་	Jemphu
Lungnyi ལུང་གཉིས་	Pangbisa སྤང་སྦིས་ས་	Khimchungnang
Lungnyi ལུང་གཉིས་	Pangbisa སྤང་སྦིས་ས་	Lhakhangnang
Lungnyi ལུང་གཉིས་	Pangbisa སྤང་སྦིས་ས་	Linga
Lungnyi ལུང་གཉིས་	Pangbisa སྤང་སྦིས་ས་	Namchikha
Lungnyi ལུང་གཉིས་	Pangbisa སྤང་སྦིས་ས་	Rangetsawa
Lungnyi ལུང་གཉིས་	Pangbisa སྤང་སྦིས་ས་	Temisema
Lungnyi ལུང་གཉིས་	Pangbisa སྤང་སྦིས་ས་	Tshoshingtengkha
Lungnyi ལུང་གཉིས་	Pangbisa སྤང་སྦིས་ས་	Ugyenguru
Lungnyi ལུང་གཉིས་	Pangbisa སྤང་སྦིས་ས་	Wolinang
Lungnyi ལུང་གཉིས་	Pangbisa སྤང་སྦིས་ས་	Wochen
Lungnyi ལུང་གཉིས་	Pangbisa སྤང་སྦིས་ས་	Wolithangkha
Naja ན་རྒྱ་	Bemphu Lingzhi Nagu བེམ་ཕུ་_གླིང་གཞི་_ན་དགུ་	Jadokha
Naja ན་རྒྱ་	Bemphu Lingzhi Nagu བེམ་ཕུ་_གླིང་གཞི་_ན་དགུ་	Lingzhi
Naja ན་རྒྱ་	Bemphu Lingzhi Nagu བེམ་ཕུ་_གླིང་གཞི་_ན་དགུ་	Nagu
Naja ན་རྒྱ་	Bemphu Lingzhi Nagu བེམ་ཕུ་_གླིང་གཞི་_ན་དགུ་	Pherukha
Naja ན་རྒྱ་	Bemphu Lingzhi Nagu བེམ་ཕུ་_གླིང་གཞི་_ན་དགུ་	Bemphu
Naja ན་རྒྱ་	Bueltikha Jagoen སྦུལ་ཏི་ཁ་_བྱ་དགོན་	Bueltikha
Naja ན་རྒྱ་	Bueltikha Jagoen སྦུལ་ཏི་ཁ་_བྱ་དགོན་	Tabjo
Naja ན་རྒྱ་	Bueltikha Jagoen སྦུལ་ཏི་ཁ་_བྱ་དགོན་	Jagoen
Naja ན་རྒྱ་	Bueltikha Jagoen སྦུལ་ཏི་ཁ་_བྱ་དགོན་	Jilikha
Naja ན་རྒྱ་	Rangzhingang Tshebji རང་བཞིན་སྒང་_ཚེབས་སྦྱིས་	Rangzhigang
Naja ན་རྒྱ་	Rangzhingang Tshebji རང་བཞིན་སྒང་_ཚེབས་སྦྱིས་	Tshebji
Naja ན་རྒྱ་	Rangzhingang Tshebji རང་བཞིན་སྒང་_ཚེབས་སྦྱིས་	Tshegoen
Naja ན་རྒྱ་	Wanakha Zursuna ཝ་ན་ཁ་_གྷཟུར་སུ་ན་	Tokhab
Naja ན་རྒྱ་	Wanakha Zursuna ཝ་ན་ཁ་_གྷཟུར་སུ་ན་	Zursuna
Naja ན་རྒྱ་	Wanakha Zursuna ཝ་ན་ཁ་_གྷཟུར་སུ་ན་	Wanakha
Naja ན་རྒྱ་	Jazhina Tsuengoen རྒྱ་གཞི་ན་_བཙུན་དགོན་	Jazhina
Naja ན་རྒྱ་	Jazhina Tsuengoen རྒྱ་གཞི་ན་_བཙུན་དགོན་	Tshendu Goenpa
Shapa ཤར་པ་	Dochhoeten Neyphu རྡོ་མཆོད་རྟེན་_གནས་ཕུ་	Neyphu
Shapa ཤར་པ་	Dochhoeten Neyphu རྡོ་མཆོད་རྟེན་_གནས་ཕུ་	Lholing
Shapa ཤར་པ་	Dochhoeten Neyphu རྡོ་མཆོད་རྟེན་_གནས་ཕུ་	Zhelngo
Shapa ཤར་པ་	Dochhoeten Neyphu རྡོ་མཆོད་རྟེན་_གནས་ཕུ་	Naychu
Shapa ཤར་པ་	Drugyaldingkha Zhelngo འབྲུག་རྒྱལ་ལྡིང་ཁ་_ཞལ་ངོ་	Gangri
Shapa ཤར་པ་	Drugyaldingkha Zhelngo འབྲུག་རྒྱལ་ལྡིང་ཁ་_ཞལ་ངོ་	Teli
Shapa ཤར་པ་	Drugyaldingkha Zhelngo འབྲུག་རྒྱལ་ལྡིང་ཁ་_ཞལ་ངོ་	Drugyaldingkha
Shapa ཤར་པ་	Bara Zhunggar བཱ་ར་_གཞུང་སྒར་	Zhunggar
Shapa ཤར་པ་	Bara Zhunggar བཱ་ར་_གཞུང་སྒར་	Bara
Shapa ཤར་པ་	Bara Zhunggar བཱ་ར་_གཞུང་སྒར་	Serina
Shapa ཤར་པ་	Bara Zhunggar བཱ་ར་_གཞུང་སྒར་	Tashichholing
Shapa ཤར་པ་	Bara Zhunggar བཱ་ར་_གཞུང་སྒར་	Zhingo
Shapa ཤར་པ་	Bara Zhunggar བཱ་ར་_གཞུང་སྒར་	Barakempa
Shapa ཤར་པ་	Bara Zhunggar བཱ་ར་_གཞུང་སྒར་	Baratokha
Shapa ཤར་པ་	Bjizhikha Phubarna སྦྱིས་གཞི་ཁ་_ཕུ་བར་ན་	Phubarna
Shapa ཤར་པ་	Bjizhikha Phubarna སྦྱིས་གཞི་ཁ་_ཕུ་བར་ན་	Serlingnang
Shapa ཤར་པ་	Bjizhikha Phubarna སྦྱིས་གཞི་ཁ་_ཕུ་བར་ན་	Bjizhikha
Shapa ཤར་པ་	Chhukha Gangjoogkha ཆུ་ཁ་_སྒང་མཇུག་ཁ་	Chesham
Shapa ཤར་པ་	Chhukha Gangjoogkha ཆུ་ཁ་_སྒང་མཇུག་ཁ་	Chhukha (Shaba)
Shapa ཤར་པ་	Chhukha Gangjoogkha ཆུ་ཁ་_སྒང་མཇུག་ཁ་	Gangjoogkha
Shapa ཤར་པ་	Chhukha Gangjoogkha ཆུ་ཁ་_སྒང་མཇུག་ཁ་	Khasuna
Tsento བཙན་ཏོ་	Soe Yagsa སྲོལ་_གཡག་ས་	Soe Domzang
Tsento བཙན་ཏོ་	Soe Yagsa སྲོལ་_གཡག་ས་	Soe Yagsa
Tsento བཙན་ཏོ་	Soe Yagsa སྲོལ་_གཡག་ས་	Yagsa
Tsento བཙན་ཏོ་	Mitshig Shana མི་ཚིག་_ཤ་ན་	Shana
Tsento བཙན་ཏོ་	Mitshig Shana མི་ཚིག་_ཤ་ན་	Chuyul
Tsento བཙན་ཏོ་	Mitshig Shana མི་ཚིག་_ཤ་ན་	Lemdo
Tsento བཙན་ཏོ་	Mitshig Shana མི་ཚིག་_ཤ་ན་	Mitshig
Tsento བཙན་ཏོ་	Chhungjey Zamsar ཆུང་རྗེས་_ཟམ་སར་	Chhungjey
Tsento བཙན་ཏོ་	Chhungjey Zamsar ཆུང་རྗེས་_ཟམ་སར་	Zamsar
Tsento བཙན་ཏོ་	Chhungjey Zamsar ཆུང་རྗེས་_ཟམ་སར་	Lemgoen
Tsento བཙན་ཏོ་	Nyamjey Phangdo ཉམས་རྗེས་_འཕང་དོག་	Chhoeding
Tsento བཙན་ཏོ་	Nyamjey Phangdo ཉམས་རྗེས་_འཕང་དོག་	Nyamjey
Tsento བཙན་ཏོ་	Nyamjey Phangdo ཉམས་རྗེས་_འཕང་དོག་	Phangdo
Tsento བཙན་ཏོ་	Nyamjey Phangdo ཉམས་རྗེས་_འཕང་དོག་	Jiutsaphu
Tsento བཙན་ཏོ་	Nyamjey Phangdo ཉམས་རྗེས་_འཕང་དོག་	Tshenshi
Tsento བཙན་ཏོ་	Nyechhu Shari ཉེས་ཆུ་_ཤར་རི་	Nyechhu
Tsento བཙན་ཏོ་	Nyechhu Shari ཉེས་ཆུ་_ཤར་རི་	Shari (Tsento)
Tsento བཙན་ཏོ་	Nyechhu Shari ཉེས་ཆུ་_ཤར་རི་	Tagtshang
Tsento བཙན་ཏོ་	Nyechhu Shari ཉེས་ཆུ་_ཤར་རི་	Tsatsam
Tsento བཙན་ཏོ་	Nyechhu Shari ཉེས་ཆུ་_ཤར་རི་	Nyamed
Wangchang ཝང་ལྕང་	Gebtoed Olathang Tajoog གེབ་སྟོད་_ཨོ་ལ་ཐང་_རྟ་འཇུག་	Gangtoed
Wangchang ཝང་ལྕང་	Gebtoed Olathang Tajoog གེབ་སྟོད་_ཨོ་ལ་ཐང་_རྟ་འཇུག་	Gebtoed
Wangchang ཝང་ལྕང་	Gebtoed Olathang Tajoog གེབ་སྟོད་_ཨོ་ལ་ཐང་_རྟ་འཇུག་	Barkor
Wangchang ཝང་ལྕང་	Gebtoed Olathang Tajoog གེབ་སྟོད་_ཨོ་ལ་ཐང་_རྟ་འཇུག་	Darzhigang
Wangchang ཝང་ལྕང་	Gebtoed Olathang Tajoog གེབ་སྟོད་_ཨོ་ལ་ཐང་_རྟ་འཇུག་	Drungna
Wangchang ཝང་ལྕང་	Gebtoed Olathang Tajoog གེབ་སྟོད་_ཨོ་ལ་ཐང་_རྟ་འཇུག་	Langmana
Wangchang ཝང་ལྕང་	Gebtoed Olathang Tajoog གེབ་སྟོད་_ཨོ་ལ་ཐང་_རྟ་འཇུག་	Nyisu
Wangchang ཝང་ལྕང་	Gebtoed Olathang Tajoog གེབ་སྟོད་_ཨོ་ལ་ཐང་_རྟ་འཇུག་	Zhingkha
Wangchang ཝང་ལྕང་	Gebtoed Olathang Tajoog གེབ་སྟོད་_ཨོ་ལ་ཐང་_རྟ་འཇུག་	Sisitakpa
Wangchang ཝང་ལྕང་	Gebtoed Olathang Tajoog གེབ་སྟོད་_ཨོ་ལ་ཐང་_རྟ་འཇུག་	Tshongdue
Wangchang ཝང་ལྕང་	Gebtoed Olathang Tajoog གེབ་སྟོད་_ཨོ་ལ་ཐང་_རྟ་འཇུག་	Yurwawog
Wangchang ཝང་ལྕང་	Gebtoed Olathang Tajoog གེབ་སྟོད་_ཨོ་ལ་ཐང་_རྟ་འཇུག་	Gangkha
Wangchang ཝང་ལྕང་	Gebtoed Olathang Tajoog གེབ་སྟོད་_ཨོ་ལ་ཐང་_རྟ་འཇུག་	Gorina
Wangchang ཝང་ལྕང་	Gebtoed Olathang Tajoog གེབ་སྟོད་_ཨོ་ལ་ཐང་_རྟ་འཇུག་	Jangkhuna
Wangchang ཝང་ལྕང་	Gebtoed Olathang Tajoog གེབ་སྟོད་_ཨོ་ལ་ཐང་_རྟ་འཇུག་	Jangsabu
Wangchang ཝང་ལྕང་	Gebtoed Olathang Tajoog གེབ་སྟོད་_ཨོ་ལ་ཐང་_རྟ་འཇུག་	Jangsina
Wangchang ཝང་ལྕང་	Gebtoed Olathang Tajoog གེབ་སྟོད་_ཨོ་ལ་ཐང་_རྟ་འཇུག་	Jangsuna
Wangchang ཝང་ལྕང་	Gebtoed Olathang Tajoog གེབ་སྟོད་_ཨོ་ལ་ཐང་_རྟ་འཇུག་	Langmana
Wangchang ཝང་ལྕང་	Gebtoed Olathang Tajoog གེབ་སྟོད་_ཨོ་ལ་ཐང་_རྟ་འཇུག་	Lankhang Jab
Wangchang ཝང་ལྕང་	Gebtoed Olathang Tajoog གེབ་སྟོད་_ཨོ་ལ་ཐང་_རྟ་འཇུག་	Nangzhikha (Wangchang)
Wangchang ཝང་ལྕང་	Gebtoed Olathang Tajoog གེབ་སྟོད་_ཨོ་ལ་ཐང་_རྟ་འཇུག་	Ngetsu
Wangchang ཝང་ལྕང་	Gebtoed Olathang Tajoog གེབ་སྟོད་_ཨོ་ལ་ཐང་_རྟ་འཇུག་	Nyisu Chotentsawa
Wangchang ཝང་ལྕང་	Gebtoed Olathang Tajoog གེབ་སྟོད་_ཨོ་ལ་ཐང་_རྟ་འཇུག་	Olathang
Wangchang ཝང་ལྕང་	Gebtoed Olathang Tajoog གེབ་སྟོད་_ཨོ་ལ་ཐང་_རྟ་འཇུག་	Omchuna
Wangchang ཝང་ལྕང་	Gebtoed Olathang Tajoog གེབ་སྟོད་_ཨོ་ལ་ཐང་_རྟ་འཇུག་	Pumsima
Wangchang ཝང་ལྕང་	Gebtoed Olathang Tajoog གེབ་སྟོད་_ཨོ་ལ་ཐང་_རྟ་འཇུག་	Pumtakha
Wangchang ཝང་ལྕང་	Gebtoed Olathang Tajoog གེབ་སྟོད་_ཨོ་ལ་ཐང་_རྟ་འཇུག་	Rampozhing
Wangchang ཝང་ལྕང་	Gebtoed Olathang Tajoog གེབ་སྟོད་_ཨོ་ལ་ཐང་_རྟ་འཇུག་	Zhikha
Wangchang ཝང་ལྕང་	Gebtoed Olathang Tajoog གེབ་སྟོད་_ཨོ་ལ་ཐང་_རྟ་འཇུག་	Sisitagpa
Wangchang ཝང་ལྕང་	Gebtoed Olathang Tajoog གེབ་སྟོད་_ཨོ་ལ་ཐང་_རྟ་འཇུག་	Tagokha
Wangchang ཝང་ལྕང་	Gebtoed Olathang Tajoog གེབ་སྟོད་_ཨོ་ལ་ཐང་_རྟ་འཇུག་	Tajoog
Wangchang ཝང་ལྕང་	Gebtoed Olathang Tajoog གེབ་སྟོད་_ཨོ་ལ་ཐང་_རྟ་འཇུག་	Tshogdu (Wangchang)
Wangchang ཝང་ལྕང་	Gebtoed Olathang Tajoog གེབ་སྟོད་_ཨོ་ལ་ཐང་_རྟ་འཇུག་	Tshshingtsawa
Wangchang ཝང་ལྕང་	Gebtoed Olathang Tajoog གེབ་སྟོད་_ཨོ་ལ་ཐང་_རྟ་འཇུག་	Tsirena
Wangchang ཝང་ལྕང་	Gebtoed Olathang Tajoog གེབ་སྟོད་_ཨོ་ལ་ཐང་_རྟ་འཇུག་	Yurwawog
Wangchang ཝང་ལྕང་	Changmedthangka Khangkhu སྤྱང་མེད་ཐང་ཁ་_ཁང་ཁུ་	Chiminang/Chimina
Wangchang ཝང་ལྕང་	Changmedthangka Khangkhu སྤྱང་མེད་ཐང་ཁ་_ཁང་ཁུ་	Chhoeten Dangrim
Wangchang ཝང་ལྕང་	Changmedthangka Khangkhu སྤྱང་མེད་ཐང་ཁ་_ཁང་ཁུ་	Dochhukha
Wangchang ཝང་ལྕང་	Changmedthangka Khangkhu སྤྱང་མེད་ཐང་ཁ་_ཁང་ཁུ་	Dungchuphu
Wangchang ཝང་ལྕང་	Changmedthangka Khangkhu སྤྱང་མེད་ཐང་ཁ་_ཁང་ཁུ་	Jieu
Wangchang ཝང་ལྕང་	Changmedthangka Khangkhu སྤྱང་མེད་ཐང་ཁ་_ཁང་ཁུ་	Jimnang
Wangchang ཝང་ལྕང་	Changmedthangka Khangkhu སྤྱང་མེད་ཐང་ཁ་_ཁང་ཁུ་	Kangjulo
Wangchang ཝང་ལྕང་	Changmedthangka Khangkhu སྤྱང་མེད་ཐང་ཁ་_ཁང་ཁུ་	Khangkhu
Wangchang ཝང་ལྕང་	Changmedthangka Khangkhu སྤྱང་མེད་ཐང་ཁ་_ཁང་ཁུ་	Changmedthangka
Wangchang ཝང་ལྕང་	Changmedthangka Khangkhu སྤྱང་མེད་ཐང་ཁ་_ཁང་ཁུ་	Segona
Wangchang ཝང་ལྕང་	Changmedthangka Khangkhu སྤྱང་མེད་ཐང་ཁ་_ཁང་ཁུ་	Wochhukha
Wangchang ཝང་ལྕང་	Changmedthangka Khangkhu སྤྱང་མེད་ཐང་ཁ་_ཁང་ཁུ་	Zakha
Wangchang ཝང་ལྕང་	Changmedthangka Khangkhu སྤྱང་མེད་ཐང་ཁ་_ཁང་ཁུ་	Khimsabu
Wangchang ཝང་ལྕང་	Changmedthangka Khangkhu སྤྱང་མེད་ཐང་ཁ་_ཁང་ཁུ་	Segona
Wangchang ཝང་ལྕང་	Changmedthangka Khangkhu སྤྱང་མེད་ཐང་ཁ་_ཁང་ཁུ་	Naymey
Wangchang ཝང་ལྕང་	Changmedthangka Khangkhu སྤྱང་མེད་ཐང་ཁ་_ཁང་ཁུ་	Zarchhekha
Wangchang ཝང་ལྕང་	Changmedthangka Khangkhu སྤྱང་མེད་ཐང་ཁ་_ཁང་ཁུ་	Wochukha
Wangchang ཝང་ལྕང་	Dungkhar Namkhar དུང་དཀར་_གནམ་དཀར་	Dungar
Wangchang ཝང་ལྕང་	Dungkhar Namkhar དུང་དཀར་_གནམ་དཀར་	Namkar
Wangchang ཝང་ལྕང་	Mendrel Nakha མན་དྲལ་_སྣ་ཁ་	Chang Rouna
Wangchang ཝང་ལྕང་	Mendrel Nakha མན་དྲལ་_སྣ་ཁ་	Chang Sinchuna
Wangchang ཝང་ལྕང་	Mendrel Nakha མན་དྲལ་_སྣ་ཁ་	Chewnang
Wangchang ཝང་ལྕང་	Mendrel Nakha མན་དྲལ་_སྣ་ཁ་	Chintsho
Wangchang ཝང་ལྕང་	Mendrel Nakha མན་དྲལ་_སྣ་ཁ་	Gangkha
Wangchang ཝང་ལྕང་	Mendrel Nakha མན་དྲལ་_སྣ་ཁ་	Gyelgang
Wangchang ཝང་ལྕང་	Mendrel Nakha མན་དྲལ་_སྣ་ཁ་	Lomlo
Wangchang ཝང་ལྕང་	Mendrel Nakha མན་དྲལ་_སྣ་ཁ་	Mendrel/Rauna
Wangchang ཝང་ལྕང་	Mendrel Nakha མན་དྲལ་_སྣ་ཁ་	Nakha
Wangchang ཝང་ལྕང་	Mendrel Nakha མན་དྲལ་_སྣ་ཁ་	Baangdey Zam
Wangchang ཝང་ལྕང་	Mendrel Nakha མན་དྲལ་_སྣ་ཁ་	Nakha/Rawna
Wangchang ཝང་ལྕང་	Mendrel Nakha མན་དྲལ་_སྣ་ཁ་	Rawna
Wangchang ཝང་ལྕང་	Mendrel Nakha མན་དྲལ་_སྣ་ཁ་	Yekukha
Wangchang ཝང་ལྕང་	Mendrel Nakha མན་དྲལ་_སྣ་ཁ་	Mendrel
Wangchang ཝང་ལྕང་	Changkar Jangteyina ཅང་དཀར་_བྱང་སྟེ་ན་	Baangdey
Wangchang ཝང་ལྕང་	Changkar Jangteyina ཅང་དཀར་_བྱང་སྟེ་ན་	Changkar
Wangchang ཝང་ལྕང་	Changkar Jangteyina ཅང་དཀར་_བྱང་སྟེ་ན་	Jangteyna

=== Pemagatshel District ===
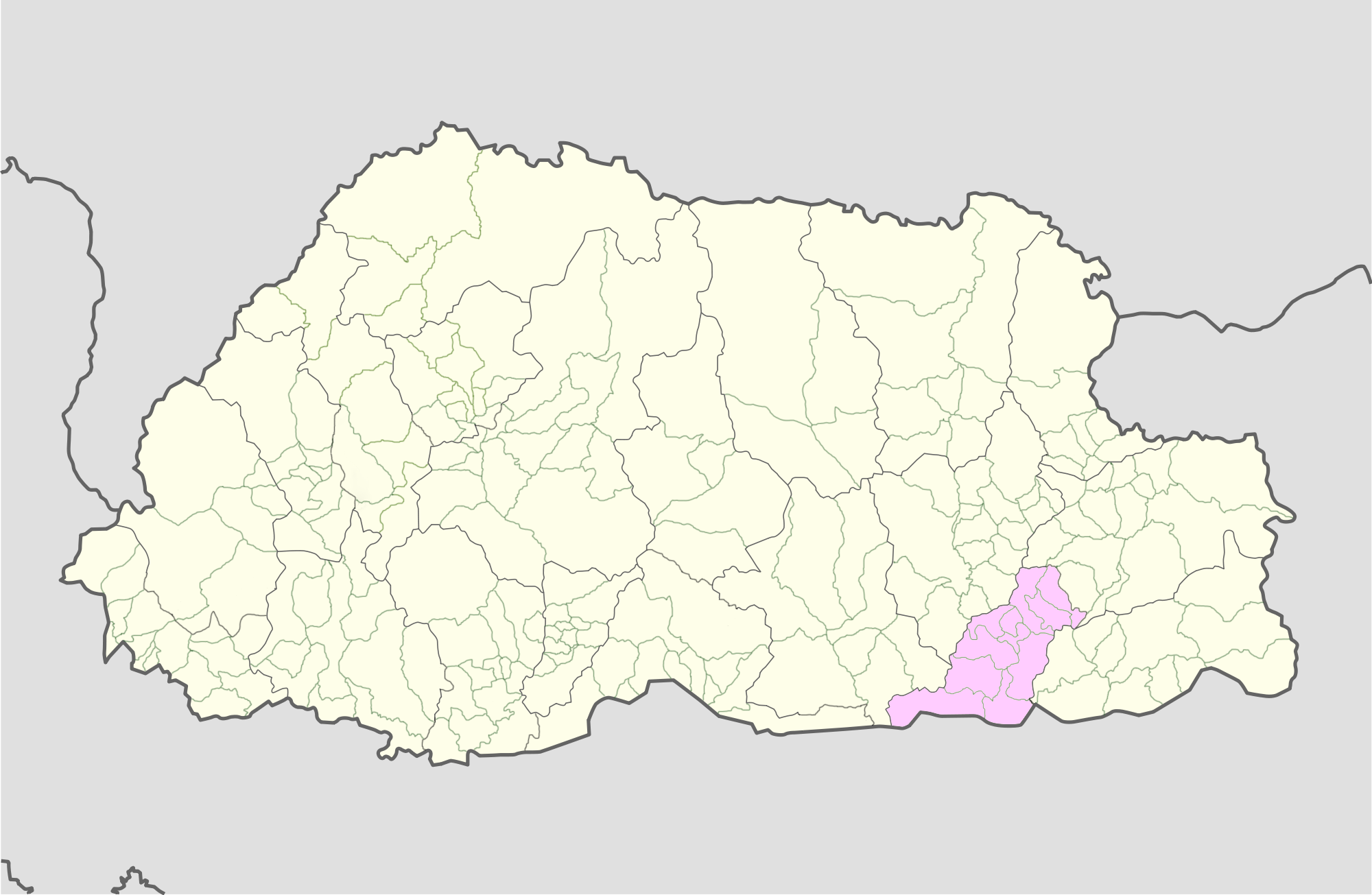
Pemagatshel District

Gewog	Chiwog	Village
Chhimoong ཕྱི་མུང་	Chhimoong ཕྱི་མུང་	Chhimoong
Chhimoong ཕྱི་མུང་	Pangthang Redingla སྦང་ཐང་_རེ་སྡིང་ལ་	Pangthang
Chhimoong ཕྱི་མུང་	Pangthang Redingla སྦང་ཐང་_རེ་སྡིང་ལ་	Redingla
Chhimoong ཕྱི་མུང་	Loongkholom ལུང་མཁོ་ལོམ་	Loongkholom
Chhimoong ཕྱི་མུང་	Nyasikhar ཉ་སི་མཁར་	Nyasikhar
Chhimoong ཕྱི་མུང་	Chhiphoong ཕྱི་ཕུངས་	Chhiphoong
Chokhorling ཆོས་འཁོར་གླིང་	Kerong སྐྱེས་རོང་	Kerong
Chokhorling ཆོས་འཁོར་གླིང་	Dizama Shoguri དྲི་ཟ་མ་_ཤོ་གུ་རི་	Dizama
Chokhorling ཆོས་འཁོར་གླིང་	Yargyewoong ཡར་རྒྱས་འུང་	Yargyewoong
Chokhorling ཆོས་འཁོར་གླིང་	Chhoekhorling Gazawong ཆོས་འཁོར་གླིང་_དགའ་ཟ་འོང་	Chhoekhorling
Chokhorling ཆོས་འཁོར་གླིང་	Arden ཨར་དྲན་	Arden
Chongshing ལྕོང་ཤིང་	Guyoom Lanangzor མགུ་ཡུམ་_ལ་ནང་ཟོར་	Guyoom
Chongshing ལྕོང་ཤིང་	Thongsa ཐོང་ས་	Thongsa
Chongshing ལྕོང་ཤིང་	Maendi སྨན་དྲི་	Maendi
Chongshing ལྕོང་ཤིང་	Chongshing Jorphoong ལྕོང་ཤིང་_འབྲོར་ཕུང་	Chongshing
Chongshing ལྕོང་ཤིང་	Chongshing Jorphoong ལྕོང་ཤིང་_འབྲོར་ཕུང་	Jorphoong
Chongshing ལྕོང་ཤིང་	Kamri Yomzor སྐམ་རི་_གཡོམ་ཟོར་	Yomzor
Dechheling བདེ་ཆེན་གླིང་	Doongchhilo Kholomri གདུང་ཆི་ལོ་_མཁོ་ལོམ་རི་	Kholomri
Dechheling བདེ་ཆེན་གླིང་	Doongphu Shingchongri གདུང་ཕུ་_ཤིང་ལྕོང་རི་	Doongphu Goenpa
Dechheling བདེ་ཆེན་གླིང་	Doongphu Shingchongri གདུང་ཕུ་_ཤིང་ལྕོང་རི་	Shingchongri
Dechheling བདེ་ཆེན་གླིང་	Namdagling རྣམ་དག་གླིང་	Namdaling
Dechheling བདེ་ཆེན་གླིང་	Dechhenling Goenpawoong བདེ་ཆེན་གླིང་_དགོན་པ་འུང་	Babta
Dechheling བདེ་ཆེན་གླིང་	Dechhenling Goenpawoong བདེ་ཆེན་གླིང་_དགོན་པ་འུང་	Gonpawoong
Dechheling བདེ་ཆེན་གླིང་	Dechhenling Goenpawoong བདེ་ཆེན་གླིང་_དགོན་པ་འུང་	Dechheling Martsala
Dechheling བདེ་ཆེན་གླིང་	Goishing Ridzommo སགོའི་ཤིང་_རི་འཛོམས་མོ་	Rognawang
Dechheling བདེ་ཆེན་གླིང་	Goishing Ridzommo སགོའི་ཤིང་_རི་འཛོམས་མོ་	Ridzomo
Dechheling བདེ་ཆེན་གླིང་	Bidoongri Yangmalashing སྦི་གབུང་རི་_གཡང་མ་ལ་ཤིང་	Mendelgang
Dungmaed གདུང་སྨད་	Serduwa གསེར་བསྡུ་ཝ་	Belna Goenpa
Dungmaed གདུང་སྨད་	Serduwa གསེར་བསྡུ་ཝ་	Mangthangri
Dungmaed གདུང་སྨད་	Serduwa གསེར་བསྡུ་ཝ་	Tep Tep La
Dungmaed གདུང་སྨད་	Bangyuel འབངས་ཡུལ་	Bangyuel
Dungmaed གདུང་སྨད་	Bangyuel འབངས་ཡུལ་	Mikuri
Dungmaed གདུང་སྨད་	Lanyiri Thrumchoong ལ་ཉི་རི་_ཁྲུམས་ཅུང་	La-Nyiri
Dungmaed གདུང་སྨད་	Lanyiri Thrumchoong ལ་ཉི་རི་_ཁྲུམས་ཅུང་	Thrumchoong
Dungmaed གདུང་སྨད་	Dungmaed Zimzor གདུང་སྨད་_གཟིམ་ཟོར་	Belnangzor
Dungmaed གདུང་སྨད་	Dungmaed Zimzor གདུང་སྨད་_གཟིམ་ཟོར་	Dungmaed
Dungmaed གདུང་སྨད་	Dungmaed Zimzor གདུང་སྨད་_གཟིམ་ཟོར་	Tomi
Dungmaed གདུང་སྨད་	Dungmaed Zimzor གདུང་སྨད་_གཟིམ་ཟོར་	Zimzor
Dungmaed གདུང་སྨད་	Woongborang འུང་སྦོ་རང་	Woonborang
Khar མཁར་	Khar Yagyur མཁར་_ཡ་འགྱུར་	Khar
Khar མཁར་	Khar Yagyur མཁར་_ཡ་འགྱུར་	Yagyur
Khar མཁར་	Bongmaan སྦོང་མན་	Bongmaan
Khar མཁར་	Shinangri སི་ནང་རི་	Duewang
Khar མཁར་	Shinangri སི་ནང་རི་	Zordoong
Khar མཁར་	Shinangri སི་ནང་རི་	Regi
Khar མཁར་	Shinangri སི་ནང་རི་	Shinangri
Khar མཁར་	Nagtseri Shemshem Tsebar གནག་རྩེ་རི་_ཤེམ་ཤེམ་_རྩེ་བར་	Khawar
Khar མཁར་	Nagtseri Shemshem Tsebar གནག་རྩེ་རི་_ཤེམ་ཤེམ་_རྩེ་བར་	Nagtseri
Khar མཁར་	Nagtseri Shemshem Tsebar གནག་རྩེ་རི་_ཤེམ་ཤེམ་_རྩེ་བར་	Phadi
Khar མཁར་	Nagtseri Shemshem Tsebar གནག་རྩེ་རི་_ཤེམ་ཤེམ་_རྩེ་བར་	Shemshem
Khar མཁར་	Nagtseri Shemshem Tsebar གནག་རྩེ་རི་_ཤེམ་ཤེམ་_རྩེ་བར་	Tsebar
Khar མཁར་	Khengzor Labar ཁེངས་ཟོར་_ལ་འབར་	Labar
Khar མཁར་	Khengzor Labar ཁེངས་ཟོར་_ལ་འབར་	Khengzor
Nanong ན་ནོང་	Gashigkhar Tshatshi སྒ་ཤིག་མཁར་_ཚྭ་ཆི་	Drangsa Wong
Nanong ན་ནོང་	Gashigkhar Tshatshi སྒ་ཤིག་མཁར་_ཚྭ་ཆི་	Jangray
Nanong ན་ནོང་	Gashigkhar Tshatshi སྒ་ཤིག་མཁར་_ཚྭ་ཆི་	Dapurung
Nanong ན་ནོང་	Gashigkhar Tshatshi སྒ་ཤིག་མཁར་_ཚྭ་ཆི་	Dongtsheri
Nanong ན་ནོང་	Gashigkhar Tshatshi སྒ་ཤིག་མཁར་_ཚྭ་ཆི་	Khaykhar
Nanong ན་ནོང་	Gashigkhar Tshatshi སྒ་ཤིག་མཁར་_ཚྭ་ཆི་	Maygamri
Nanong ན་ནོང་	Gashigkhar Tshatshi སྒ་ཤིག་མཁར་_ཚྭ་ཆི་	Muna
Nanong ན་ནོང་	Gashigkhar Tshatshi སྒ་ཤིག་མཁར་_ཚྭ་ཆི་	Panglap Thongma
Nanong ན་ནོང་	Gashigkhar Tshatshi སྒ་ཤིག་མཁར་_ཚྭ་ཆི་	Rangthang Wong
Nanong ན་ནོང་	Gashigkhar Tshatshi སྒ་ཤིག་མཁར་_ཚྭ་ཆི་	Sangshing Tang
Nanong ན་ནོང་	Gashigkhar Tshatshi སྒ་ཤིག་མཁར་_ཚྭ་ཆི་	Sayrimkha
Nanong ན་ནོང་	Gashigkhar Tshatshi སྒ་ཤིག་མཁར་_ཚྭ་ཆི་	Thongthung Goenpa
Nanong ན་ནོང་	Gashigkhar Tshatshi སྒ་ཤིག་མཁར་_ཚྭ་ཆི་	Thrangshing
Nanong ན་ནོང་	Gashigkhar Tshatshi སྒ་ཤིག་མཁར་_ཚྭ་ཆི་	Bainangtang
Nanong ན་ནོང་	Gashigkhar Tshatshi སྒ་ཤིག་མཁར་_ཚྭ་ཆི་	Champhari
Nanong ན་ནོང་	Gashigkhar Tshatshi སྒ་ཤིག་མཁར་_ཚྭ་ཆི་	Dhalung
Nanong ན་ནོང་	Gashigkhar Tshatshi སྒ་ཤིག་མཁར་_ཚྭ་ཆི་	Gashingkhar
Nanong ན་ནོང་	Gashigkhar Tshatshi སྒ་ཤིག་མཁར་_ཚྭ་ཆི་	Laypheri
Nanong ན་ནོང་	Gashigkhar Tshatshi སྒ་ཤིག་མཁར་_ཚྭ་ཆི་	Lumri
Nanong ན་ནོང་	Gashigkhar Tshatshi སྒ་ཤིག་མཁར་_ཚྭ་ཆི་	Mongthung
Nanong ན་ནོང་	Gashigkhar Tshatshi སྒ་ཤིག་མཁར་_ཚྭ་ཆི་	Sayri
Nanong ན་ནོང་	Gashigkhar Tshatshi སྒ་ཤིག་མཁར་_ཚྭ་ཆི་	Thongthung
Nanong ན་ནོང་	Gashigkhar Tshatshi སྒ་ཤིག་མཁར་_ཚྭ་ཆི་	Tshatshi
Nanong ན་ནོང་	Nanong ན་ནོང་	Nanong
Nanong ན་ནོང་	Nanong ན་ནོང་	Kheydong
Nanong ན་ནོང་	Nanong ན་ནོང་	Menphu
Nanong ན་ནོང་	Nanong ན་ནོང་	Phalamphu
Nanong ན་ནོང་	Nanong ན་ནོང་	Relung
Nanong ན་ནོང་	Nanong ན་ནོང་	Sa Yul
Nanong ན་ནོང་	Nanong ན་ནོང་	Thongshing Gag
Nanong ན་ནོང་	Nanong ན་ནོང་	Zhingri
Nanong ན་ནོང་	Nanong ན་ནོང་	Kulung
Nanong ན་ནོང་	Nanong ན་ནོང་	Pangthang
Nanong ན་ནོང་	Raling ར་གླིང་	Denphu
Nanong ན་ནོང་	Raling ར་གླིང་	Barkadung
Nanong ན་ནོང་	Raling ར་གླིང་	Borphu
Nanong ན་ནོང་	Raling ར་གླིང་	Ghorkaling
Nanong ན་ནོང་	Raling ར་གླིང་	Jomgom
Nanong ན་ནོང་	Raling ར་གླིང་	Khangmari
Nanong ན་ནོང་	Raling ར་གླིང་	Kheshingri
Nanong ན་ནོང་	Raling ར་གླིང་	Raling
Nanong ན་ནོང་	Raling ར་གླིང་	Thorkhar
Nanong ན་ནོང་	Tokari ལྟོ་ཀ་རི་	Bargoenpa
Nanong ན་ནོང་	Tokari ལྟོ་ཀ་རི་	Rangshi Gayri
Nanong ན་ནོང་	Tokari ལྟོ་ཀ་རི་	Rangshi Goenpa
Nanong ན་ནོང་	Tokari ལྟོ་ཀ་རི་	Rashu Goenpa
Nanong ན་ནོང་	Tokari ལྟོ་ཀ་རི་	Tokari
Nanong ན་ནོང་	Tokari ལྟོ་ཀ་རི་	Tokari Gayri
Nanong ན་ནོང་	Terphug Woongchhiloo གཏེར་ཕུག་_འུང་ཆི་ལུ་	Rayzor
Nanong ན་ནོང་	Terphug Woongchhiloo གཏེར་ཕུག་_འུང་ཆི་ལུ་	Gayri
Nanong ན་ནོང་	Terphug Woongchhiloo གཏེར་ཕུག་_འུང་ཆི་ལུ་	Jazung
Nanong ན་ནོང་	Terphug Woongchhiloo གཏེར་ཕུག་_འུང་ཆི་ལུ་	Menjung
Nanong ན་ནོང་	Terphug Woongchhiloo གཏེར་ཕུག་_འུང་ཆི་ལུ་	Terphug
Nanong ན་ནོང་	Terphug Woongchhiloo གཏེར་ཕུག་_འུང་ཆི་ལུ་	Woongchhillo
Nanong ན་ནོང་	Terphug Woongchhiloo གཏེར་ཕུག་_འུང་ཆི་ལུ་	Woulingtang
Norbugang ནོར་བུ་སྒང་	Norboogang Rinchhenzor ནོར་བུ་སྒང་_རིན་ཆེན་ཟོར་	Norboogang
Norbugang ནོར་བུ་སྒང་	Norboogang Rinchhenzor ནོར་བུ་སྒང་_རིན་ཆེན་ཟོར་	Rinchenzor
Norbugang ནོར་བུ་སྒང་	Nyingshingborang ཉིང་ཤིང་སྦོ་རང་	Nyingshingborang
Norbugang ནོར་བུ་སྒང་	Tshaelshingzor ཚལ་ཤིང་ཟོར་	Tshaelshingzor
Norbugang ནོར་བུ་སྒང་	Gashari ག་ཤ་རི་	Gashari
Norbugang ནོར་བུ་སྒང་	Maenchhu Nganglam སྨན་ཆུ་_ངང་ལམ་	Maenchu
Norbugang ནོར་བུ་སྒང་	Maenchhu Nganglam སྨན་ཆུ་_ངང་ལམ་	Nganglam
Norbugang ནོར་བུ་སྒང་	Maenchhu Nganglam སྨན་ཆུ་_ངང་ལམ་	Nganglam Bazar
Shumar ཤུ་མར་	Chongmashing Dagor ལྕོང་མ་ཤིང་_ཟླ་སྒོར་	Chongmashing
Shumar ཤུ་མར་	Chongmashing Dagor ལྕོང་མ་ཤིང་_ཟླ་སྒོར་	Bainangwoong
Shumar ཤུ་མར་	Chongmashing Dagor ལྕོང་མ་ཤིང་_ཟླ་སྒོར་	Dagor
Shumar ཤུ་མར་	Chongmashing Dagor ལྕོང་མ་ཤིང་_ཟླ་སྒོར་	Waphel
Shumar ཤུ་མར་	Goenpoong Shali དགོན་སྤུངས་_ཤ་ལི་	Gamung
Shumar ཤུ་མར་	Goenpoong Shali དགོན་སྤུངས་_ཤ་ལི་	Goenpoong
Shumar ཤུ་མར་	Goenpoong Shali དགོན་སྤུངས་_ཤ་ལི་	Shali
Shumar ཤུ་མར་	Nangkor ནང་སྐོར་	Nangkhor
Shumar ཤུ་མར་	Nangkor ནང་སྐོར་	Shumar
Shumar ཤུ་མར་	Bartseri བར་རྩེ་རི་	Bartsheri
Shumar ཤུ་མར་	Bartseri བར་རྩེ་རི་	Kheri Goenpa
Shumar ཤུ་མར་	Khothagpa Yalang མགོ་འཐག་པ་_ཡ་ལང་	Khothagpa
Shumar ཤུ་མར་	Khothagpa Yalang མགོ་འཐག་པ་_ཡ་ལང་	Yalang
Yurung ཡུ་རུང་	Khangma ཁང་མ་	Khangma
Yurung ཡུ་རུང་	Bangdala སྦང་ད་ལ་	Gomtshang
Yurung ཡུ་རུང་	Bangdala སྦང་ད་ལ་	Joenkha
Yurung ཡུ་རུང་	Bangdala སྦང་ད་ལ་	Bangdala
Yurung ཡུ་རུང་	Bangdala སྦང་ད་ལ་	Phutsoongbori
Yurung ཡུ་རུང་	Bangdala སྦང་ད་ལ་	Porila
Yurung ཡུ་རུང་	Bangdala སྦང་ད་ལ་	Pangthang
Yurung ཡུ་རུང་	Wanglakho Thoonggo ཝང་ལ་མཁོ་_མཐང་སྒོ་	Wanglakho
Yurung ཡུ་རུང་	Wanglakho Thoonggo ཝང་ལ་མཁོ་_མཐང་སྒོ་	Chengri
Yurung ཡུ་རུང་	Wanglakho Thoonggo ཝང་ལ་མཁོ་_མཐང་སྒོ་	Thoonggo
Yurung ཡུ་རུང་	Doongsingma Thoongkhar གདུང་སིང་མ་_མཐུང་མཁར་	Dooknang
Yurung ཡུ་རུང་	Doongsingma Thoongkhar གདུང་སིང་མ་_མཐུང་མཁར་	Doongnang
Yurung ཡུ་རུང་	Doongsingma Thoongkhar གདུང་སིང་མ་_མཐུང་མཁར་	Doongsingma
Yurung ཡུ་རུང་	Doongsingma Thoongkhar གདུང་སིང་མ་_མཐུང་མཁར་	Doopkang
Yurung ཡུ་རུང་	Doongsingma Thoongkhar གདུང་སིང་མ་_མཐུང་མཁར་	Lhawong
Yurung ཡུ་རུང་	Doongsingma Thoongkhar གདུང་སིང་མ་_མཐུང་མཁར་	Phusumri
Yurung ཡུ་རུང་	Doongsingma Thoongkhar གདུང་སིང་མ་_མཐུང་མཁར་	Thoongkhar
Yurung ཡུ་རུང་	Khominang Yangkhar མཁོ་མི་ནང་_ཡང་མཁར་	Rezor
Yurung ཡུ་རུང་	Khominang Yangkhar མཁོ་མི་ནང་_ཡང་མཁར་	Jarimenang
Yurung ཡུ་རུང་	Khominang Yangkhar མཁོ་མི་ནང་_ཡང་མཁར་	Khominang
Yurung ཡུ་རུང་	Khominang Yangkhar མཁོ་མི་ནང་_ཡང་མཁར་	Yangkhar
Zobel བཟོ་སྦལ་	Choongkhar Pangthangdaza ཁྱང་མཁར་_སྤང་ཐང་ད་ཟ་	Choongkhar
Zobel བཟོ་སྦལ་	Choongkhar Pangthangdaza ཁྱང་མཁར་_སྤང་ཐང་ད་ཟ་	Lenshingkhar
Zobel བཟོ་སྦལ་	Choongkhar Pangthangdaza ཁྱང་མཁར་_སྤང་ཐང་ད་ཟ་	Pangthangdaza
Zobel བཟོ་སྦལ་	Choongkhar Pangthangdaza ཁྱང་མཁར་_སྤང་ཐང་ད་ཟ་	Shumarjug
Zobel བཟོ་སྦལ་	Zobel བཟོ་སྦལ་	Zobel
Zobel བཟོ་སྦལ་	Ngangmalang Zorjoog ངང་མ་ལང་_ཟོར་འཇུག་	Ngangmalang
Zobel བཟོ་སྦལ་	Raysinang རས་སི་ནང་	Raysinang
Zobel བཟོ་སྦལ་	Maan Tshelinggor མཱན་_ཚེ་གླིང་སྒོར་	Tshelinggor

=== Punakha District ===
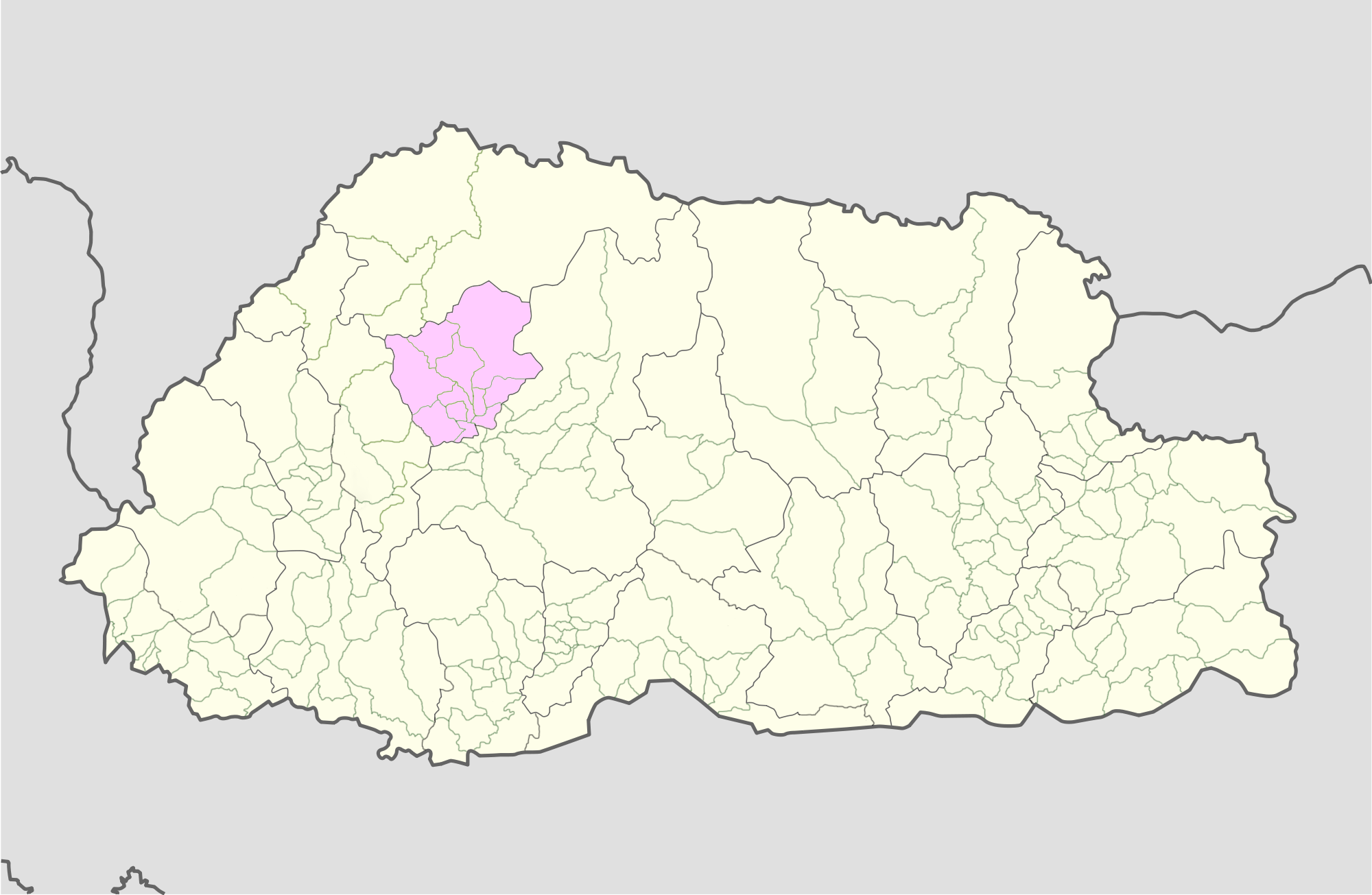
Punakha District

Gewog	Chiwog	Village
Barp བརཔ་	Chagsa ལྕགས་ས་	Boemena
Barp བརཔ་	Chagsa ལྕགས་ས་	Chagsa
Barp བརཔ་	Chagsa ལྕགས་ས་	Geonchhukha
Barp བརཔ་	Chagsa ལྕགས་ས་	Tongde Baykha
Barp བརཔ་	Sobsokha Yuwakha Zhikha སོབ་སོ་ཁ་_གཡུ་བ་ཁ་_གཞི་ཁ་	Lobesa
Barp བརཔ་	Sobsokha Yuwakha Zhikha སོབ་སོ་ཁ་_གཡུ་བ་ཁ་_གཞི་ཁ་	Mitshigna
Barp བརཔ་	Sobsokha Yuwakha Zhikha སོབ་སོ་ཁ་_གཡུ་བ་ཁ་_གཞི་ཁ་	Sobsokha
Barp བརཔ་	Sobsokha Yuwakha Zhikha སོབ་སོ་ཁ་_གཡུ་བ་ཁ་_གཞི་ཁ་	Yuwakha
Barp བརཔ་	Sobsokha Yuwakha Zhikha སོབ་སོ་ཁ་_གཡུ་བ་ཁ་_གཞི་ཁ་	Zhikha
Barp བརཔ་	Usakha དབུ་ས་ཁ་	Jaloong
Barp བརཔ་	Usakha དབུ་ས་ཁ་	Lumina
Barp བརཔ་	Usakha དབུ་ས་ཁ་	Pachheykha
Barp བརཔ་	Usakha དབུ་ས་ཁ་	Usakha
Barp བརཔ་	Usakha དབུ་ས་ཁ་	Choezhikha
Barp བརཔ་	Usakha དབུ་ས་ཁ་	Menchuzakha
Barp བརཔ་	Usakha དབུ་ས་ཁ་	Dosega
Barp བརཔ་	Tshogkorna ཚོགས་སྐོར་ན་	Tshogkorna
Barp བརཔ་	Tshogkorna ཚོགས་སྐོར་ན་	Gangkha
Barp བརཔ་	Gamakha Sebtokha སྒ་མ་ཁ་_སེབ་རྟོ་ཁ་	Dechendingkha
Barp བརཔ་	Gamakha Sebtokha སྒ་མ་ཁ་_སེབ་རྟོ་ཁ་	Gangmaloongma
Barp བརཔ་	Gamakha Sebtokha སྒ་མ་ཁ་_སེབ་རྟོ་ཁ་	Gamkha
Barp བརཔ་	Gamakha Sebtokha སྒ་མ་ཁ་_སེབ་རྟོ་ཁ་	Laphuna
Barp བརཔ་	Gamakha Sebtokha སྒ་མ་ཁ་_སེབ་རྟོ་ཁ་	Phuntshoyangkhel
Barp བརཔ་	Gamakha Sebtokha སྒ་མ་ཁ་_སེབ་རྟོ་ཁ་	Sebjeekha
Barp བརཔ་	Gamakha Sebtokha སྒ་མ་ཁ་_སེབ་རྟོ་ཁ་	Sebtokha
Chhubug ཆུ་སྦུག་	Ngoedroobchhu དངོས་གྲུབ་ཅུ་	Chukhu Ngoedroobchhu
Chhubug ཆུ་སྦུག་	Ngoedroobchhu དངོས་གྲུབ་ཅུ་	Chuphu Ngoedroobchhu
Chhubug ཆུ་སྦུག་	Ngoedroobchhu དངོས་གྲུབ་ཅུ་	Ngoedroobchhu
Chhubug ཆུ་སྦུག་	Ngoedroobchhu དངོས་གྲུབ་ཅུ་	Ngoedroobchhu Chukha
Chhubug ཆུ་སྦུག་	Ngoedroobchhu དངོས་གྲུབ་ཅུ་	Ngoedroobchhu Khimchena
Chhubug ཆུ་སྦུག་	Ngoedroobchhu དངོས་གྲུབ་ཅུ་	Ngoedroobchhu Tenkha
Chhubug ཆུ་སྦུག་	Ngoedroobchhu དངོས་གྲུབ་ཅུ་	Humpathang
Chhubug ཆུ་སྦུག་	Ngoedroobchhu དངོས་གྲུབ་ཅུ་	Kepailo
Chhubug ཆུ་སྦུག་	Bumtakha Tenpakha བུམ་ཏ་ཁ་_བསྟན་པ་ཁ་	Bumtakha
Chhubug ཆུ་སྦུག་	Bumtakha Tenpakha བུམ་ཏ་ཁ་_བསྟན་པ་ཁ་	Jangkholo
Chhubug ཆུ་སྦུག་	Bumtakha Tenpakha བུམ་ཏ་ཁ་_བསྟན་པ་ཁ་	Lorina
Chhubug ཆུ་སྦུག་	Bumtakha Tenpakha བུམ་ཏ་ཁ་_བསྟན་པ་ཁ་	Rechena
Chhubug ཆུ་སྦུག་	Bumtakha Tenpakha བུམ་ཏ་ཁ་_བསྟན་པ་ཁ་	Tenpakha
Chhubug ཆུ་སྦུག་	Jangwakha Sewala བྱང་བ་ཁ་_སེ་བ་ལ་	Jangwakha
Chhubug ཆུ་སྦུག་	Jangwakha Sewala བྱང་བ་ཁ་_སེ་བ་ལ་	Nawakha
Chhubug ཆུ་སྦུག་	Jangwakha Sewala བྱང་བ་ཁ་_སེ་བ་ལ་	Sewala
Chhubug ཆུ་སྦུག་	Bali བ་ལི་	Bali
Chhubug ཆུ་སྦུག་	Yebisa ཡས་སྦིས་ས་	Lhabisa
Chhubug ཆུ་སྦུག་	Yebisa ཡས་སྦིས་ས་	Puna Gom
Chhubug ཆུ་སྦུག་	Yebisa ཡས་སྦིས་ས་	Yebisa
Dzomi འཅོམས་མི་	Gubji Tseykakha གུབ་ཇི་_རྩེ་ཀ་ཁ་	Tseykhakha
Dzomi འཅོམས་མི་	Gubji Tseykakha གུབ་ཇི་_རྩེ་ཀ་ཁ་	Tseykha
Dzomi འཅོམས་མི་	Gubji Tseykakha གུབ་ཇི་_རྩེ་ཀ་ཁ་	Gubji
Dzomi འཅོམས་མི་	Khilikhar Loongkha ཁྱིལ་ལི་ཁར་_ལུང་ཁ་	Danamo
Dzomi འཅོམས་མི་	Khilikhar Loongkha ཁྱིལ་ལི་ཁར་_ལུང་ཁ་	Jangsar
Dzomi འཅོམས་མི་	Khilikhar Loongkha ཁྱིལ་ལི་ཁར་_ལུང་ཁ་	Loongkha
Dzomi འཅོམས་མི་	Khilikhar Loongkha ཁྱིལ་ལི་ཁར་_ལུང་ཁ་	Loongkhajang
Dzomi འཅོམས་མི་	Khilikhar Loongkha ཁྱིལ་ལི་ཁར་_ལུང་ཁ་	Jasha Goenpa
Dzomi འཅོམས་མི་	Khilikhar Loongkha ཁྱིལ་ལི་ཁར་_ལུང་ཁ་	Khilikhar
Dzomi འཅོམས་མི་	Tanag Uesa རྟ་ནག་_དབུ་ས་	Jangsarbu
Dzomi འཅོམས་མི་	Tanag Uesa རྟ་ནག་_དབུ་ས་	Likashong
Dzomi འཅོམས་མི་	Tanag Uesa རྟ་ནག་_དབུ་ས་	Tanag
Dzomi འཅོམས་མི་	Tanag Uesa རྟ་ནག་_དབུ་ས་	Thangzhi
Dzomi འཅོམས་མི་	Tanag Uesa རྟ་ནག་_དབུ་ས་	Uesakha
Dzomi འཅོམས་མི་	Dzomisa Mendagang འཛོམས་མི་ས་_མེ་མདའ་སྒང་	Mendagang
Dzomi འཅོམས་མི་	Dzomisa Mendagang འཛོམས་མི་ས་_མེ་མདའ་སྒང་	Changjokha
Dzomi འཅོམས་མི་	Dzomisa Mendagang འཛོམས་མི་ས་_མེ་མདའ་སྒང་	Dzomisa
Dzomi འཅོམས་མི་	Jimithang སྦྱིས་མི་ཐང་	Jimithang
Dzomi འཅོམས་མི་	Jimithang སྦྱིས་མི་ཐང་	Yangchenkha
Goenshari དགོམ་ཤ་རི་	Goomgang སྒུམ་སྒང་	Goomgang
Goenshari དགོམ་ཤ་རི་	Yorbo ཡོར་སྦོ་	Yorbo
Goenshari དགོམ་ཤ་རི་	Draagchhukha བྲག་ཆུ་ཁ་	Draagchhukha
Goenshari དགོམ་ཤ་རི་	Sechaednang ས་བཅད་ནང་	Sechednang
Goenshari དགོམ་ཤ་རི་	Sechednang Rimchhu	
Goenshari དགོམ་ཤ་རི་	Zhelngoesa གཞལ་ངོས་ས་	Zhelngoesa
Guma གུ་མ་	Dochhukha Dzomlingthang Ritsa རྡོ་ཆུ་ག_འཛོམས་གླིང་ཐང་_རི་རྩ་	Dochhukha
Guma གུ་མ་	Dochhukha Dzomlingthang Ritsa རྡོ་ཆུ་ག_འཛོམས་གླིང་ཐང་_རི་རྩ་	Dochhukha Bangmena
Guma གུ་མ་	Dochhukha Dzomlingthang Ritsa རྡོ་ཆུ་ག_འཛོམས་གླིང་ཐང་_རི་རྩ་	Dochhukha Menchugang
Guma གུ་མ་	Dochhukha Dzomlingthang Ritsa རྡོ་ཆུ་ག_འཛོམས་གླིང་ཐང་_རི་རྩ་	DochhukhaRitsa
Guma གུ་མ་	Dochhukha Dzomlingthang Ritsa རྡོ་ཆུ་ག_འཛོམས་གླིང་ཐང་_རི་རྩ་	Dochhukha Tongsana
Guma གུ་མ་	Lakhu Tshowogm ལ་ཁུ་_མཚོ་འོགམ་	Lakhu
Guma གུ་མ་	Lakhu Tshowogm ལ་ཁུ་_མཚོ་འོགམ་	Dochhukha Phaduna
Guma གུ་མ་	Baymenang Phulingsoom Wangwakha སབེ་མི་ནང་_ཕུ་གླིང་གསུམ་_ཝང་ཝ་ཁ་	Dochhukha Goenpa
Guma གུ་མ་	Baymenang Phulingsoom Wangwakha སབེ་མི་ནང་_ཕུ་གླིང་གསུམ་_ཝང་ཝ་ཁ་	Botolo
Guma གུ་མ་	Baymenang Phulingsoom Wangwakha སབེ་མི་ནང་_ཕུ་གླིང་གསུམ་_ཝང་ཝ་ཁ་	Chokhor Luchhu
Guma གུ་མ་	Baymenang Phulingsoom Wangwakha སབེ་མི་ནང་_ཕུ་གླིང་གསུམ་_ཝང་ཝ་ཁ་	Baymenang
Guma གུ་མ་	Baymenang Phulingsoom Wangwakha སབེ་མི་ནང་_ཕུ་གླིང་གསུམ་_ཝང་ཝ་ཁ་	Dargaygang
Guma གུ་མ་	Baymenang Phulingsoom Wangwakha སབེ་མི་ནང་_ཕུ་གླིང་གསུམ་_ཝང་ཝ་ཁ་	Dawana
Guma གུ་མ་	Baymenang Phulingsoom Wangwakha སབེ་མི་ནང་_ཕུ་གླིང་གསུམ་_ཝང་ཝ་ཁ་	Gagona
Guma གུ་མ་	Baymenang Phulingsoom Wangwakha སབེ་མི་ནང་_ཕུ་གླིང་གསུམ་_ཝང་ཝ་ཁ་	Gona Tengkha
Guma གུ་མ་	Baymenang Phulingsoom Wangwakha སབེ་མི་ནང་_ཕུ་གླིང་གསུམ་_ཝང་ཝ་ཁ་	Nibji
Guma གུ་མ་	Baymenang Phulingsoom Wangwakha སབེ་མི་ནང་_ཕུ་གླིང་གསུམ་_ཝང་ཝ་ཁ་	Nibjiwoma
Guma གུ་མ་	Baymenang Phulingsoom Wangwakha སབེ་མི་ནང་_ཕུ་གླིང་གསུམ་_ཝང་ཝ་ཁ་	Tenpakha
Guma གུ་མ་	Baymenang Phulingsoom Wangwakha སབེ་མི་ནང་_ཕུ་གླིང་གསུམ་_ཝང་ཝ་ཁ་	Wangwakha
Guma གུ་མ་	Baymenang Phulingsoom Wangwakha སབེ་མི་ནང་_ཕུ་གླིང་གསུམ་_ཝང་ཝ་ཁ་	Zerkha
Guma གུ་མ་	Changyuel Loongsilgang Tashijong ལྕང་ཡུལ་_རླུང་བསིལ་སྒང་_བཀྲིས་ལྗོངས་	Zamdongkhar Dongkhuju
Guma གུ་མ་	Changyuel Loongsilgang Tashijong ལྕང་ཡུལ་_རླུང་བསིལ་སྒང་_བཀྲིས་ལྗོངས་	Zamdongkhar Logodama
Guma གུ་མ་	Changyuel Loongsilgang Tashijong ལྕང་ཡུལ་_རླུང་བསིལ་སྒང་_བཀྲིས་ལྗོངས་	Zamdongkhar Loongsilgang
Guma གུ་མ་	Changyuel Loongsilgang Tashijong ལྕང་ཡུལ་_རླུང་བསིལ་སྒང་_བཀྲིས་ལྗོངས་	Zamdongkhar Tashijong
Guma གུ་མ་	Changyuel Loongsilgang Tashijong ལྕང་ཡུལ་_རླུང་བསིལ་སྒང་_བཀྲིས་ལྗོངས་	Zamdongkhar Zinchey
Guma གུ་མ་	Changyuel Loongsilgang Tashijong ལྕང་ཡུལ་_རླུང་བསིལ་སྒང་_བཀྲིས་ལྗོངས་	Dongkokha Drapchegang
Guma གུ་མ་	Changyuel Loongsilgang Tashijong ལྕང་ཡུལ་_རླུང་བསིལ་སྒང་_བཀྲིས་ལྗོངས་	Dongkokha Loongsilgang
Guma གུ་མ་	Changyuel Loongsilgang Tashijong ལྕང་ཡུལ་_རླུང་བསིལ་སྒང་_བཀྲིས་ལྗོངས་	Dongkokha Pepchu
Guma གུ་མ་	Changyuel Loongsilgang Tashijong ལྕང་ཡུལ་_རླུང་བསིལ་སྒང་_བཀྲིས་ལྗོངས་	Zamdongkhar Bebigacha
Guma གུ་མ་	Changyuel Loongsilgang Tashijong ལྕང་ཡུལ་_རླུང་བསིལ་སྒང་_བཀྲིས་ལྗོངས་	Zamdongkhar Bebigar
Guma གུ་མ་	Changyuel Loongsilgang Tashijong ལྕང་ཡུལ་_རླུང་བསིལ་སྒང་_བཀྲིས་ལྗོངས་	Zamdongkhar Bebigarkha
Guma གུ་མ་	Changyuel Loongsilgang Tashijong ལྕང་ཡུལ་_རླུང་བསིལ་སྒང་_བཀྲིས་ལྗོངས་	Zamdongkhar Changyuel
Guma གུ་མ་	Changyuel Loongsilgang Tashijong ལྕང་ཡུལ་_རླུང་བསིལ་སྒང་_བཀྲིས་ལྗོངས་	Zamdongkhar Gaupay
Guma གུ་མ་	Changyuel Loongsilgang Tashijong ལྕང་ཡུལ་_རླུང་བསིལ་སྒང་_བཀྲིས་ལྗོངས་	Zamdongkhar Laykha
Guma གུ་མ་	Changyuel Loongsilgang Tashijong ལྕང་ཡུལ་_རླུང་བསིལ་སྒང་_བཀྲིས་ལྗོངས་	Zamdongkhar Simtogang
Guma གུ་མ་	Changyuel Loongsilgang Tashijong ལྕང་ཡུལ་_རླུང་བསིལ་སྒང་_བཀྲིས་ལྗོངས་	Zamdongkhar Thara
Guma གུ་མ་	Changyuel Loongsilgang Tashijong ལྕང་ཡུལ་_རླུང་བསིལ་སྒང་_བཀྲིས་ལྗོངས་	Baypai Gangkha
Guma གུ་མ་	Changyuel Loongsilgang Tashijong ལྕང་ཡུལ་_རླུང་བསིལ་སྒང་_བཀྲིས་ལྗོངས་	Jangchubchen
Guma གུ་མ་	Changyuel Loongsilgang Tashijong ལྕང་ཡུལ་_རླུང་བསིལ་སྒང་_བཀྲིས་ལྗོངས་	Logodama
Guma གུ་མ་	Changyuel Loongsilgang Tashijong ལྕང་ཡུལ་_རླུང་བསིལ་སྒང་_བཀྲིས་ལྗོངས་	Semtogangchhu
Guma གུ་མ་	Changyuel Loongsilgang Tashijong ལྕང་ཡུལ་_རླུང་བསིལ་སྒང་_བཀྲིས་ལྗོངས་	Tharabachey
Guma གུ་མ་	Changyuel Loongsilgang Tashijong ལྕང་ཡུལ་_རླུང་བསིལ་སྒང་_བཀྲིས་ལྗོངས་	Tongtshasho
Guma གུ་མ་	Guma Wolakha གུ་མ་_ཝོ་ལ་ཁ་	Bemsesi
Guma གུ་མ་	Guma Wolakha གུ་མ་_ཝོ་ལ་ཁ་	Bemsesi Khuru
Guma གུ་མ་	Guma Wolakha གུ་མ་_ཝོ་ལ་ཁ་	Guma
Guma གུ་མ་	Guma Wolakha གུ་མ་_ཝོ་ལ་ཁ་	Khuru Bemsesi
Guma གུ་མ་	Guma Wolakha གུ་མ་_ཝོ་ལ་ཁ་	Khuru Bamsesi Washegang
Guma གུ་མ་	Guma Wolakha གུ་མ་_ཝོ་ལ་ཁ་	Wolajangsa Gumagangju
Guma གུ་མ་	Guma Wolakha གུ་མ་_ཝོ་ལ་ཁ་	Jangsa
Guma གུ་མ་	Guma Wolakha གུ་མ་_ཝོ་ལ་ཁ་	Wolakha
Kabisa དཀར་སྦི་ས་	Chhoetennyingpo Uesarkha མཆོད་རྟེན་རྙིང་པོ་_གཡུས་གསར་ཁ་	Ap Zhuksa
Kabisa དཀར་སྦི་ས་	Chhoetennyingpo Uesarkha མཆོད་རྟེན་རྙིང་པོ་_གཡུས་གསར་ཁ་	Bara
Kabisa དཀར་སྦི་ས་	Chhoetennyingpo Uesarkha མཆོད་རྟེན་རྙིང་པོ་_གཡུས་གསར་ཁ་	Chhoeten Nyingpo
Kabisa དཀར་སྦི་ས་	Chhoetennyingpo Uesarkha མཆོད་རྟེན་རྙིང་པོ་_གཡུས་གསར་ཁ་	Chuzamgang
Kabisa དཀར་སྦི་ས་	Chhoetennyingpo Uesarkha མཆོད་རྟེན་རྙིང་པོ་_གཡུས་གསར་ཁ་	Dzongchung
Kabisa དཀར་སྦི་ས་	Chhoetennyingpo Uesarkha མཆོད་རྟེན་རྙིང་པོ་_གཡུས་གསར་ཁ་	Jangsa
Kabisa དཀར་སྦི་ས་	Chhoetennyingpo Uesarkha མཆོད་རྟེན་རྙིང་པོ་_གཡུས་གསར་ཁ་	Lengo Gaysa
Kabisa དཀར་སྦི་ས་	Chhoetennyingpo Uesarkha མཆོད་རྟེན་རྙིང་པོ་_གཡུས་གསར་ཁ་	Pangreju
Kabisa དཀར་སྦི་ས་	Chhoetennyingpo Uesarkha མཆོད་རྟེན་རྙིང་པོ་_གཡུས་གསར་ཁ་	Phakakha
Kabisa དཀར་སྦི་ས་	Chhoetennyingpo Uesarkha མཆོད་རྟེན་རྙིང་པོ་_གཡུས་གསར་ཁ་	Zhingsahang
Kabisa དཀར་སྦི་ས་	Chhoetennyingpo Uesarkha མཆོད་རྟེན་རྙིང་པོ་_གཡུས་གསར་ཁ་	Damteykha
Kabisa དཀར་སྦི་ས་	Chhoetennyingpo Uesarkha མཆོད་རྟེན་རྙིང་པོ་_གཡུས་གསར་ཁ་	Dokuna
Kabisa དཀར་སྦི་ས་	Chhoetennyingpo Uesarkha མཆོད་རྟེན་རྙིང་པོ་_གཡུས་གསར་ཁ་	Dokuna sophu
Kabisa དཀར་སྦི་ས་	Chhoetennyingpo Uesarkha མཆོད་རྟེན་རྙིང་པོ་_གཡུས་གསར་ཁ་	Tshomiding
Kabisa དཀར་སྦི་ས་	Chhoetennyingpo Uesarkha མཆོད་རྟེན་རྙིང་པོ་_གཡུས་གསར་ཁ་	Uesarkha
Kabisa དཀར་སྦི་ས་	Chhoetennyingpo Uesarkha མཆོད་རྟེན་རྙིང་པོ་_གཡུས་གསར་ཁ་	Yurbu
Kabisa དཀར་སྦི་ས་	Chhoetennyingpo Uesarkha མཆོད་རྟེན་རྙིང་པོ་_གཡུས་གསར་ཁ་	Kelwagang
Kabisa དཀར་སྦི་ས་	Chhoetennyingpo Uesarkha མཆོད་རྟེན་རྙིང་པོ་_གཡུས་གསར་ཁ་	Tongsigang
Kabisa དཀར་སྦི་ས་	Heyloog Tongzhoognang ཧེ་ལུག་_སྟོང་བཞུགས་ནང་	Dophukha
Kabisa དཀར་སྦི་ས་	Heyloog Tongzhoognang ཧེ་ལུག་_སྟོང་བཞུགས་ནང་	Heyloog
Kabisa དཀར་སྦི་ས་	Heyloog Tongzhoognang ཧེ་ལུག་_སྟོང་བཞུགས་ནང་	Haylu Tongshu
Kabisa དཀར་སྦི་ས་	Heyloog Tongzhoognang ཧེ་ལུག་_སྟོང་བཞུགས་ནང་	Tongshina
Kabisa དཀར་སྦི་ས་	Heyloog Tongzhoognang ཧེ་ལུག་_སྟོང་བཞུགས་ནང་	Tongchena
Kabisa དཀར་སྦི་ས་	Heyloog Tongzhoognang ཧེ་ལུག་_སྟོང་བཞུགས་ནང་	Tongzhoonang
Kabisa དཀར་སྦི་ས་	Heyloog Tongzhoognang ཧེ་ལུག་_སྟོང་བཞུགས་ནང་	Tongshiremay
Kabisa དཀར་སྦི་ས་	Agonang Zarbisa ཨ་སྒོ་ནང་_ཟར་སྦིས་ས་	Agonang
Kabisa དཀར་སྦི་ས་	Agonang Zarbisa ཨ་སྒོ་ནང་_ཟར་སྦིས་ས་	Chisegang
Kabisa དཀར་སྦི་ས་	Agonang Zarbisa ཨ་སྒོ་ནང་_ཟར་སྦིས་ས་	Chulukha
Kabisa དཀར་སྦི་ས་	Agonang Zarbisa ཨ་སྒོ་ནང་_ཟར་སྦིས་ས་	Kazhikha
Kabisa དཀར་སྦི་ས་	Agonang Zarbisa ཨ་སྒོ་ནང་_ཟར་སྦིས་ས་	Loongtikha
Kabisa དཀར་སྦི་ས་	Agonang Zarbisa ཨ་སྒོ་ནང་_ཟར་སྦིས་ས་	Rangrekha
Kabisa དཀར་སྦི་ས་	Agonang Zarbisa ཨ་སྒོ་ནང་_ཟར་སྦིས་ས་	Yuwa
Kabisa དཀར་སྦི་ས་	Agonang Zarbisa ཨ་སྒོ་ནང་_ཟར་སྦིས་ས་	Zarbisa
Kabisa དཀར་སྦི་ས་	Peltari དཔལ་ལྟ་རི་	Peltari
Kabisa དཀར་སྦི་ས་	Sirang Wakoodamchhi སི་རི་སྒང་_ཝ་རྐུ་འདམ་ཕྱི་	Serigang
Kabisa དཀར་སྦི་ས་	Sirang Wakoodamchhi སི་རི་སྒང་_ཝ་རྐུ་འདམ་ཕྱི་	Damchi
Kabisa དཀར་སྦི་ས་	Sirang Wakoodamchhi སི་རི་སྒང་_ཝ་རྐུ་འདམ་ཕྱི་	Tshetenang
Kabisa དཀར་སྦི་ས་	Sirang Wakoodamchhi སི་རི་སྒང་_ཝ་རྐུ་འདམ་ཕྱི་	Wakhuna
Kabisa དཀར་སྦི་ས་	Sirang Wakoodamchhi སི་རི་སྒང་_ཝ་རྐུ་འདམ་ཕྱི་	Botokha
Lingmukha གླིང་མུ་ཁ་	Lingmukha གླིང་མུ་ཁ་	Lingmukha
Lingmukha གླིང་མུ་ཁ་	Nabchhed ནགས་ཕྱད་	Nabchhed
Lingmukha གླིང་མུ་ཁ་	Dompala དོམ་པ་ལ་	Dompala
Lingmukha གླིང་མུ་ཁ་	Goomkarmo གུམ་སྐར་མོ་	Goomkarmo
Lingmukha གླིང་མུ་ཁ་	Oomtekha ཨུམ་ཏེ་ཁ་	Oomtekha
Shelnga Bjemi ཤེལ་རྔ་_སྦྱེ་མི་	Datong མདའ་སྟོང་	Bara
Shelnga Bjemi ཤེལ་རྔ་_སྦྱེ་མི་	Datong མདའ་སྟོང་	Datong Goenpa
Shelnga Bjemi ཤེལ་རྔ་_སྦྱེ་མི་	Datong མདའ་སྟོང་	Mendrelji
Shelnga Bjemi ཤེལ་རྔ་_སྦྱེ་མི་	Thongbji མཐོང་སྦྱིས་	Yedogang
Shelnga Bjemi ཤེལ་རྔ་_སྦྱེ་མི་	Thongbji མཐོང་སྦྱིས་	Yedopang
Shelnga Bjemi ཤེལ་རྔ་_སྦྱེ་མི་	Thongbji མཐོང་སྦྱིས་	Bangna Thanka
Shelnga Bjemi ཤེལ་རྔ་_སྦྱེ་མི་	Thongbji མཐོང་སྦྱིས་	Barna Thangka
Shelnga Bjemi ཤེལ་རྔ་_སྦྱེ་མི་	Thongbji མཐོང་སྦྱིས་	Gumena
Shelnga Bjemi ཤེལ་རྔ་_སྦྱེ་མི་	Thongbji མཐོང་སྦྱིས་	Jimjig
Shelnga Bjemi ཤེལ་རྔ་_སྦྱེ་མི་	Thongbji མཐོང་སྦྱིས་	Thonji
Shelnga Bjemi ཤེལ་རྔ་_སྦྱེ་མི་	Thongbji མཐོང་སྦྱིས་	Tshamkana
Shelnga Bjemi ཤེལ་རྔ་_སྦྱེ་མི་	Gangkha སྒང་ཁ་	Gangchula
Shelnga Bjemi ཤེལ་རྔ་_སྦྱེ་མི་	Gangkha སྒང་ཁ་	Gangkha
Shelnga Bjemi ཤེལ་རྔ་_སྦྱེ་མི་	Gangkha སྒང་ཁ་	Gangla
Shelnga Bjemi ཤེལ་རྔ་_སྦྱེ་མི་	Gangkha སྒང་ཁ་	Langjo
Shelnga Bjemi ཤེལ་རྔ་_སྦྱེ་མི་	Gangkha སྒང་ཁ་	Nangpakha
Shelnga Bjemi ཤེལ་རྔ་_སྦྱེ་མི་	Gangkha སྒང་ཁ་	Norboo Tashi
Shelnga Bjemi ཤེལ་རྔ་_སྦྱེ་མི་	Gangkha སྒང་ཁ་	Nyebakha
Shelnga Bjemi ཤེལ་རྔ་_སྦྱེ་མི་	Gangkha སྒང་ཁ་	Tagochen
Shelnga Bjemi ཤེལ་རྔ་_སྦྱེ་མི་	Khubji Tshosa ཁུབ་ཇི་_མཚོ་ས་	Chongchog Goenpa
Shelnga Bjemi ཤེལ་རྔ་_སྦྱེ་མི་	Khubji Tshosa ཁུབ་ཇི་_མཚོ་ས་	Domina
Shelnga Bjemi ཤེལ་རྔ་_སྦྱེ་མི་	Khubji Tshosa ཁུབ་ཇི་_མཚོ་ས་	Dubchu Goenpa
Shelnga Bjemi ཤེལ་རྔ་_སྦྱེ་མི་	Khubji Tshosa ཁུབ་ཇི་_མཚོ་ས་	Garakha
Shelnga Bjemi ཤེལ་རྔ་_སྦྱེ་མི་	Khubji Tshosa ཁུབ་ཇི་_མཚོ་ས་	Goen Wogma
Shelnga Bjemi ཤེལ་རྔ་_སྦྱེ་མི་	Khubji Tshosa ཁུབ་ཇི་_མཚོ་ས་	Japana
Shelnga Bjemi ཤེལ་རྔ་_སྦྱེ་མི་	Khubji Tshosa ཁུབ་ཇི་_མཚོ་ས་	Khubji
Shelnga Bjemi ཤེལ་རྔ་_སྦྱེ་མི་	Khubji Tshosa ཁུབ་ཇི་_མཚོ་ས་	Shenga Goenpa
Shelnga Bjemi ཤེལ་རྔ་_སྦྱེ་མི་	Khubji Tshosa ཁུབ་ཇི་_མཚོ་ས་	Tshosa
Shelnga Bjemi ཤེལ་རྔ་_སྦྱེ་མི་	Khubji Tshosa ཁུབ་ཇི་_མཚོ་ས་	Kutsiphakhar
Shelnga Bjemi ཤེལ་རྔ་_སྦྱེ་མི་	Khubji Tshosa ཁུབ་ཇི་_མཚོ་ས་	Loigima
Shelnga Bjemi ཤེལ་རྔ་_སྦྱེ་མི་	Khubji Tshosa ཁུབ་ཇི་_མཚོ་ས་	Manikha
Shelnga Bjemi ཤེལ་རྔ་_སྦྱེ་མི་	Khubji Tshosa ཁུབ་ཇི་_མཚོ་ས་	Pangzhi
Shelnga Bjemi ཤེལ་རྔ་_སྦྱེ་མི་	Khubji Tshosa ཁུབ་ཇི་_མཚོ་ས་	Songchumo
Shelnga Bjemi ཤེལ་རྔ་_སྦྱེ་མི་	Chongzhi Jarigang Jazhikha སྐྱོང་ཞི་_བྱ་རི་གང་_བྱ་ཞི་ཁ་	Chongzhikha
Shelnga Bjemi ཤེལ་རྔ་_སྦྱེ་མི་	Chongzhi Jarigang Jazhikha སྐྱོང་ཞི་_བྱ་རི་གང་_བྱ་ཞི་ཁ་	Goleygang
Shelnga Bjemi ཤེལ་རྔ་_སྦྱེ་མི་	Chongzhi Jarigang Jazhikha སྐྱོང་ཞི་_བྱ་རི་གང་_བྱ་ཞི་ཁ་	Jarigang
Shelnga Bjemi ཤེལ་རྔ་_སྦྱེ་མི་	Chongzhi Jarigang Jazhikha སྐྱོང་ཞི་_བྱ་རི་གང་_བྱ་ཞི་ཁ་	Jazhikha
Shelnga Bjemi ཤེལ་རྔ་_སྦྱེ་མི་	Chongzhi Jarigang Jazhikha སྐྱོང་ཞི་_བྱ་རི་གང་_བྱ་ཞི་ཁ་	Keparabsel
Shelnga Bjemi ཤེལ་རྔ་_སྦྱེ་མི་	Chongzhi Jarigang Jazhikha སྐྱོང་ཞི་_བྱ་རི་གང་_བྱ་ཞི་ཁ་	Palu
Shelnga Bjemi ཤེལ་རྔ་_སྦྱེ་མི་	Chongzhi Jarigang Jazhikha སྐྱོང་ཞི་_བྱ་རི་གང་_བྱ་ཞི་ཁ་	Menchudamley
Talog རྟ་ལོག་	Loongnangkha ལུང་ནང་ཁ་	Jawana
Talog རྟ་ལོག་	Loongnangkha ལུང་ནང་ཁ་	Loongnangkha
Talog རྟ་ལོག་	Loongnangkha ལུང་ནང་ཁ་	Lutamo
Talog རྟ་ལོག་	Loongnangkha ལུང་ནང་ཁ་	Paagchhakha
Talog རྟ་ལོག་	Loongnangkha ལུང་ནང་ཁ་	Pangmarpo
Talog རྟ་ལོག་	Loongnangkha ལུང་ནང་ཁ་	Kidlingkha
Talog རྟ་ལོག་	Loongnangkha ལུང་ནང་ཁ་	Gomgang
Talog རྟ་ལོག་	Loongnangkha ལུང་ནང་ཁ་	Lungtamo
Talog རྟ་ལོག་	Loongnangkha ལུང་ནང་ཁ་	Lungtengang
Talog རྟ་ལོག་	Loongnangkha ལུང་ནང་ཁ་	Zamdongkhar Pangalay
Talog རྟ་ལོག་	Dongkokhar Yonggu གདོང་ཀོ་ཁར་_ཡོངས་གུ་	Dongkokhar
Talog རྟ་ལོག་	Dongkokhar Yonggu གདོང་ཀོ་ཁར་_ཡོངས་གུ་	Dongkokhar Shongrina
Talog རྟ་ལོག་	Dongkokhar Yonggu གདོང་ཀོ་ཁར་_ཡོངས་གུ་	Yonggu
Talog རྟ་ལོག་	Norbugang ནོར་བུ་སྒང་	Norbugang
Talog རྟ་ལོག་	Norbugang ནོར་བུ་སྒང་	Norbugang Bemidingkha
Talog རྟ་ལོག་	Norbugang ནོར་བུ་སྒང་	Norbugang Bulgang
Talog རྟ་ལོག་	Norbugang ནོར་བུ་སྒང་	Norbugang Dashigang
Talog རྟ་ལོག་	Norbugang ནོར་བུ་སྒང་	Norbugang Gaupay
Talog རྟ་ལོག་	Norbugang ནོར་བུ་སྒང་	Norbugang Lamseri
Talog རྟ་ལོག་	Norbugang ནོར་བུ་སྒང་	Norbugang Serinang
Talog རྟ་ལོག་	Norbugang ནོར་བུ་སྒང་	Norbugang Tshochuna
Talog རྟ་ལོག་	Talog རྟ་ལོག་	Talog
Talog རྟ་ལོག་	Talog རྟ་ལོག་	Talog Goenpa
Talog རྟ་ལོག་	Gangthramo Labtsakha Soelwadrangsa སྒང་ཕྲ་མོ་_ལབ་རྩ་ཁ་_གསོལ་བ་དྲང་ས་	Labtsakha
Talog རྟ་ལོག་	Gangthramo Labtsakha Soelwadrangsa སྒང་ཕྲ་མོ་_ལབ་རྩ་ཁ་_གསོལ་བ་དྲང་ས་	Gangthramo
Toepaisa སཏོད་པའི་ས་	Bichhekha Yuelhamo སྦིས་ཆེ་ཁ་_ཡུལ་འ་མོ་	Bichhekha
Toepaisa སཏོད་པའི་ས་	Bichhekha Yuelhamo སྦིས་ཆེ་ཁ་_ཡུལ་འ་མོ་	Bemsisi
Toepaisa སཏོད་པའི་ས་	Bichhekha Yuelhamo སྦིས་ཆེ་ཁ་_ཡུལ་འ་མོ་	Tang Ho
Toepaisa སཏོད་པའི་ས་	Bichhekha Yuelhamo སྦིས་ཆེ་ཁ་_ཡུལ་འ་མོ་	Yuel Ham O
Toepaisa སཏོད་པའི་ས་	Damkhyi Rinakha དམ་ཁྱི་_རི་ན་ཁ་	Rinakha
Toepaisa སཏོད་པའི་ས་	Damkhyi Rinakha དམ་ཁྱི་_རི་ན་ཁ་	Damkhyi
Toepaisa སཏོད་པའི་ས་	Damkhyi Rinakha དམ་ཁྱི་_རི་ན་ཁ་	Lungjam
Toepaisa སཏོད་པའི་ས་	Damkhyi Rinakha དམ་ཁྱི་_རི་ན་ཁ་	Stokha
Toepaisa སཏོད་པའི་ས་	Damkhyi Rinakha དམ་ཁྱི་_རི་ན་ཁ་	Chandana
Toepaisa སཏོད་པའི་ས་	Dochogla Maenchhuna རྡོ་ཅོག་ལ་_སྨན་ཆུ་ན་	Aechey
Toepaisa སཏོད་པའི་ས་	Dochogla Maenchhuna རྡོ་ཅོག་ལ་_སྨན་ཆུ་ན་	Jaloong
Toepaisa སཏོད་པའི་ས་	Dochogla Maenchhuna རྡོ་ཅོག་ལ་_སྨན་ཆུ་ན་	Maenchhuna
Toepaisa སཏོད་པའི་ས་	Dochogla Maenchhuna རྡོ་ཅོག་ལ་_སྨན་ཆུ་ན་	Phentekha
Toepaisa སཏོད་པའི་ས་	Dochogla Maenchhuna རྡོ་ཅོག་ལ་_སྨན་ཆུ་ན་	Toktogkha
Toepaisa སཏོད་པའི་ས་	Dochogla Maenchhuna རྡོ་ཅོག་ལ་_སྨན་ཆུ་ན་	Dochogla
Toepaisa སཏོད་པའི་ས་	Lemjakha Thinleygang ལེམ་བྱ་ཁ་_འཕྲིས་སྒང་	Thinleygang
Toepaisa སཏོད་པའི་ས་	Lemjakha Thinleygang ལེམ་བྱ་ཁ་_འཕྲིས་སྒང་	Lemjakha
Toepaisa སཏོད་པའི་ས་	Lemjakha Thinleygang ལེམ་བྱ་ཁ་_འཕྲིས་སྒང་	Tokha
Toepaisa སཏོད་པའི་ས་	Lemjakha Thinleygang ལེམ་བྱ་ཁ་_འཕྲིས་སྒང་	Tsheringgang
Toepaisa སཏོད་པའི་ས་	Lemjakha Thinleygang ལེམ་བྱ་ཁ་_འཕྲིས་སྒང་	Yanglo
Toepaisa སཏོད་པའི་ས་	Goenmkha Mendrelgang དགོནམ་ཁ་_མན་དྲལ་སྒང་	Bomthangka
Toepaisa སཏོད་པའི་ས་	Goenmkha Mendrelgang དགོནམ་ཁ་_མན་དྲལ་སྒང་	Ghagsa
Toepaisa སཏོད་པའི་ས་	Goenmkha Mendrelgang དགོནམ་ཁ་_མན་དྲལ་སྒང་	Chenlekha
Toepaisa སཏོད་པའི་ས་	Goenmkha Mendrelgang དགོནམ་ཁ་_མན་དྲལ་སྒང་	Goenmkha
Toepaisa སཏོད་པའི་ས་	Goenmkha Mendrelgang དགོནམ་ཁ་_མན་དྲལ་སྒང་	Goenmsa
Toepaisa སཏོད་པའི་ས་	Goenmkha Mendrelgang དགོནམ་ཁ་_མན་དྲལ་སྒང་	Mendrelgang
Toepaisa སཏོད་པའི་ས་	Goenmkha Mendrelgang དགོནམ་ཁ་_མན་དྲལ་སྒང་	Siluna
Toewang སྟོད་ཝང་	Kewanang Tsachhuphu ཀེ་བ་ནང་_ཚྭ་ཆུ་ཕུ་	Bederlo
Toewang སྟོད་ཝང་	Kewanang Tsachhuphu ཀེ་བ་ནང་_ཚྭ་ཆུ་ཕུ་	Chungkha
Toewang སྟོད་ཝང་	Kewanang Tsachhuphu ཀེ་བ་ནང་_ཚྭ་ཆུ་ཕུ་	Dabji
Toewang སྟོད་ཝང་	Kewanang Tsachhuphu ཀེ་བ་ནང་_ཚྭ་ཆུ་ཕུ་	Dengana
Toewang སྟོད་ཝང་	Kewanang Tsachhuphu ཀེ་བ་ནང་_ཚྭ་ཆུ་ཕུ་	Darshongma
Toewang སྟོད་ཝང་	Kewanang Tsachhuphu ཀེ་བ་ནང་_ཚྭ་ཆུ་ཕུ་	Kewana
Toewang སྟོད་ཝང་	Kewanang Tsachhuphu ཀེ་བ་ནང་_ཚྭ་ཆུ་ཕུ་	Kutshana
Toewang སྟོད་ཝང་	Kewanang Tsachhuphu ཀེ་བ་ནང་_ཚྭ་ཆུ་ཕུ་	Limkha
Toewang སྟོད་ཝང་	Kewanang Tsachhuphu ཀེ་བ་ནང་_ཚྭ་ཆུ་ཕུ་	Naripa
Toewang སྟོད་ཝང་	Kewanang Tsachhuphu ཀེ་བ་ནང་_ཚྭ་ཆུ་ཕུ་	Nebtenkha
Toewang སྟོད་ཝང་	Kewanang Tsachhuphu ཀེ་བ་ནང་_ཚྭ་ཆུ་ཕུ་	Tsachuphu
Toewang སྟོད་ཝང་	Kewanang Tsachhuphu ཀེ་བ་ནང་_ཚྭ་ཆུ་ཕུ་	Tsachuphu Kati
Toewang སྟོད་ཝང་	Kewanang Tsachhuphu ཀེ་བ་ནང་_ཚྭ་ཆུ་ཕུ་	Tsachuphugang
Toewang སྟོད་ཝང་	Kewanang Tsachhuphu ཀེ་བ་ནང་_ཚྭ་ཆུ་ཕུ་	Gengo
Toewang སྟོད་ཝང་	Kewanang Tsachhuphu ཀེ་བ་ནང་_ཚྭ་ཆུ་ཕུ་	Lebchulo
Toewang སྟོད་ཝང་	Kewanang Tsachhuphu ཀེ་བ་ནང་_ཚྭ་ཆུ་ཕུ་	Tsering
Toewang སྟོད་ཝང་	Tamigdamchhu Thangbji རྟ་མིག་དམ་ཆུ་_ཐང་སྦྱིས་	Omchupang
Toewang སྟོད་ཝང་	Tamigdamchhu Thangbji རྟ་མིག་དམ་ཆུ་_ཐང་སྦྱིས་	Pangsho
Toewang སྟོད་ཝང་	Tamigdamchhu Thangbji རྟ་མིག་དམ་ཆུ་_ཐང་སྦྱིས་	Raro
Toewang སྟོད་ཝང་	Tamigdamchhu Thangbji རྟ་མིག་དམ་ཆུ་_ཐང་སྦྱིས་	Tamidamchu
Toewang སྟོད་ཝང་	Tamigdamchhu Thangbji རྟ་མིག་དམ་ཆུ་_ཐང་སྦྱིས་	Thangji
Toewang སྟོད་ཝང་	Dawakha ཟླ་བ་ཁ་	Dawakha
Toewang སྟོད་ཝང་	Dawakha ཟླ་བ་ཁ་	Dawanang
Toewang སྟོད་ཝང་	Jibjo Yuesakha སྦྱིབ་ཇོ་_གཡུས་གསར་ཁ་	Bidongkha Tsetending
Toewang སྟོད་ཝང་	Jibjo Yuesakha སྦྱིབ་ཇོ་_གཡུས་གསར་ཁ་	Bidongkha
Toewang སྟོད་ཝང་	Jibjo Yuesakha སྦྱིབ་ཇོ་_གཡུས་གསར་ཁ་	Samdingkha
Toewang སྟོད་ཝང་	Jibjo Yuesakha སྦྱིབ་ཇོ་_གཡུས་གསར་ཁ་	Wangkha
Toewang སྟོད་ཝང་	Jibjo Yuesakha སྦྱིབ་ཇོ་_གཡུས་གསར་ཁ་	Yuesakha
Toewang སྟོད་ཝང་	Jibjo Yuesakha སྦྱིབ་ཇོ་_གཡུས་གསར་ཁ་	Tsephu
Toewang སྟོད་ཝང་	Tsephug Khawakha རྩེ་ཕུག་_ཁ་ཝ་ཁ་	Tsephu Atako
Toewang སྟོད་ཝང་	Tsephug Khawakha རྩེ་ཕུག་_ཁ་ཝ་ཁ་	Tsephu Bumpai Tsawa
Toewang སྟོད་ཝང་	Tsephug Khawakha རྩེ་ཕུག་_ཁ་ཝ་ཁ་	Tsephu Jara
Toewang སྟོད་ཝང་	Tsephug Khawakha རྩེ་ཕུག་_ཁ་ཝ་ཁ་	Tsephu Khawakha
Toewang སྟོད་ཝང་	Tsephug Khawakha རྩེ་ཕུག་_ཁ་ཝ་ཁ་	Tsephu Semeki
Toewang སྟོད་ཝང་	Tsephug Khawakha རྩེ་ཕུག་_ཁ་ཝ་ཁ་	Yusakha Neyji
Toewang སྟོད་ཝང་	Tsephug Khawakha རྩེ་ཕུག་_ཁ་ཝ་ཁ་	Jarakha
Toewang སྟོད་ཝང་	Tsephug Khawakha རྩེ་ཕུག་_ཁ་ཝ་ཁ་	Jopkha

=== Samdrup Jongkhar District ===
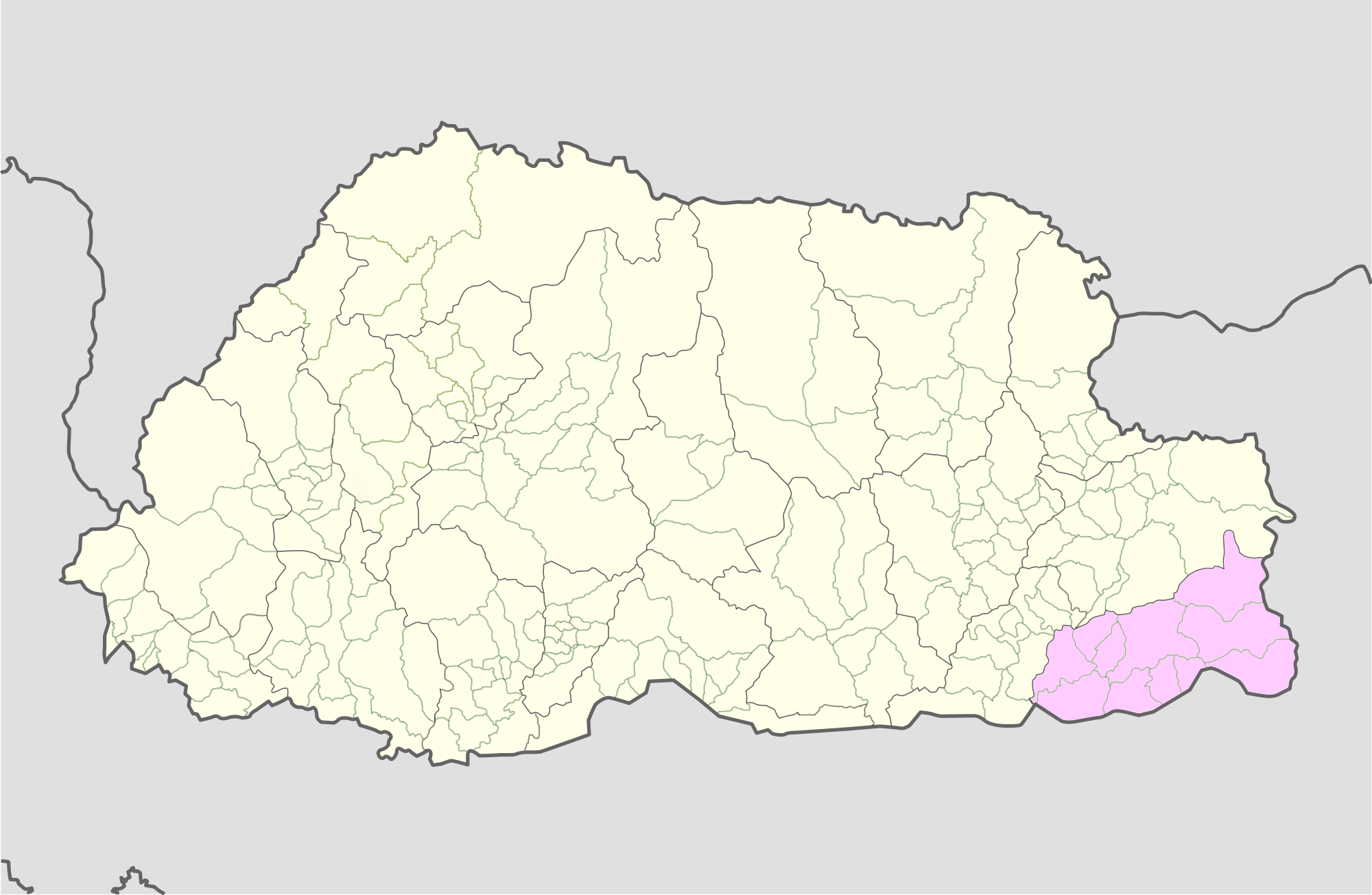
Samdrup Jongkhar District

Gewog	Chiwog	Village
Dewathang དབེ་བ་ཐང་	Martang མར་སྟངས་	Martang
Dewathang དབེ་བ་ཐང་	Martang མར་སྟངས་	Gerwa
Dewathang དབེ་བ་ཐང་	Martang མར་སྟངས་	Ashikhar
Dewathang དབེ་བ་ཐང་	Domphoog Dungkharchhoeling སྡོམས་ཕུག་_གདུང་དཀར་ཆོས་གླིང་	Domphoog
Dewathang དབེ་བ་ཐང་	Bangtsho བང་འཚོ་	Bangtsho
Dewathang དབེ་བ་ཐང་	Chhenangri Rishor ཆེ་ནང་རི་_རི་ཤོར་	Chhenangri
Dewathang དབེ་བ་ཐང་	Chhenangri Rishor ཆེ་ནང་རི་_རི་ཤོར་	Rishor
Dewathang དབེ་བ་ཐང་	Rikhey རི་མཁས་	Rikhey
Gomdar སྒམ་དར་	Narphoong ནར་དཕུང་	Narphoong
Gomdar སྒམ་དར་	Gomdar Richhanglu སྒོམ་དར་_རི་ཆང་ལུ་	Rechanglu
Gomdar སྒམ་དར་	Gomdar Richhanglu སྒོམ་དར་_རི་ཆང་ལུ་	Sawang
Gomdar སྒམ་དར་	Gomdar Richhanglu སྒོམ་དར་_རི་ཆང་ལུ་	Amshing
Gomdar སྒམ་དར་	Gomdar Richhanglu སྒོམ་དར་_རི་ཆང་ལུ་	Brongshing
Gomdar སྒམ་དར་	Gomdar Richhanglu སྒོམ་དར་_རི་ཆང་ལུ་	Gomdar
Gomdar སྒམ་དར་	Khoyarpangthang Palroong མཁོ་གཡར་སྤང་ཐངས་_དཔལ་རུང་	Bargoenpa
Gomdar སྒམ་དར་	Khoyarpangthang Palroong མཁོ་གཡར་སྤང་ཐངས་_དཔལ་རུང་	Belnang Woong
Gomdar སྒམ་དར་	Khoyarpangthang Palroong མཁོ་གཡར་སྤང་ཐངས་_དཔལ་རུང་	Khandoma
Gomdar སྒམ་དར་	Khoyarpangthang Palroong མཁོ་གཡར་སྤང་ཐངས་_དཔལ་རུང་	Khoyar PAngthang
Gomdar སྒམ་དར་	Khoyarpangthang Palroong མཁོ་གཡར་སྤང་ཐངས་_དཔལ་རུང་	Palroong
Gomdar སྒམ་དར་	Denchhi བདེན་ཕྱི་	Denchhi
Gomdar སྒམ་དར་	Denchhi བདེན་ཕྱི་	Denchhi Khoyar
Gomdar སྒམ་དར་	Denchhi བདེན་ཕྱི་	Khoyar
Gomdar སྒམ་དར་	Denchhi བདེན་ཕྱི་	Luzor
Gomdar སྒམ་དར་	Denchhi བདེན་ཕྱི་	Rongchanglu
Gomdar སྒམ་དར་	Broomi Chidoongkhar སྦྲུམ་མི་_སྤྱི་གདུང་མཁར་	Bazor
Gomdar སྒམ་དར་	Broomi Chidoongkhar སྦྲུམ་མི་_སྤྱི་གདུང་མཁར་	Broomi
Gomdar སྒམ་དར་	Broomi Chidoongkhar སྦྲུམ་མི་_སྤྱི་གདུང་མཁར་	Chidoongkhar
Gomdar སྒམ་དར་	Broomi Chidoongkhar སྦྲུམ་མི་_སྤྱི་གདུང་མཁར་	Fremi
Langchenphu གླང་ཅན་ཕུ་	Rongchhuthang རོང་ཆུ་ཐང་	Rongchhuthang (Khowrong)
Langchenphu གླང་ཅན་ཕུ་	Rongchhuthang རོང་ཆུ་ཐང་	Chelthang (Kharbandi/Khowrong)
Langchenphu གླང་ཅན་ཕུ་	Agoorthang ཨ་གུར་ཐང་	Agoorthang (Aguritar)
Langchenphu གླང་ཅན་ཕུ་	Agoorthang ཨ་གུར་ཐང་	Damtsang (Daldalay)
Langchenphu གླང་ཅན་ཕུ་	Agoorthang ཨ་གུར་ཐང་	Pagshingkha (Malabasy)
Langchenphu གླང་ཅན་ཕུ་	Agoorthang ཨ་གུར་ཐང་	Dewathang (Nangley)
Langchenphu གླང་ཅན་ཕུ་	Jampani འཇམ་དཔའ་ཎི་	Jampani
Langchenphu གླང་ཅན་ཕུ་	Jampani འཇམ་དཔའ་ཎི་	Jomotshangkha (Daifam Throm)
Langchenphu གླང་ཅན་ཕུ་	Langchenphu གླང་ཅན་ཕུ་	Langchenphu Maed (Lower Hastinapur)
Langchenphu གླང་ཅན་ཕུ་	Langchenphu གླང་ཅན་ཕུ་	Lanchenphu Toed (Upper Hastinapur)
Langchenphu གླང་ཅན་ཕུ་	Jangsa བྱང་ས་	Namchazor (Bajhrangi)
Langchenphu གླང་ཅན་ཕུ་	Jangsa བྱང་ས་	Aumshing (Betholi)
Langchenphu གླང་ཅན་ཕུ་	Jangsa བྱང་ས་	Jangsawom (Lower Golanti)
Langchenphu གླང་ཅན་ཕུ་	Jangsa བྱང་ས་	Jansagom (Upper Golanti)
Lauri ལའུ་རི་	Momring Rolnang མོམ་རིང་_རོལ་ནང་	Momring
Lauri ལའུ་རི་	Momring Rolnang མོམ་རིང་_རོལ་ནང་	Phajo Goenpa
Lauri ལའུ་རི་	Momring Rolnang མོམ་རིང་_རོལ་ནང་	Relnang
Lauri ལའུ་རི་	Lauri ལའུ་རི་	Lauri
Lauri ལའུ་རི་	Lauri ལའུ་རི་	Patpanadang
Lauri ལའུ་རི་	Lauri ལའུ་རི་	Woongthig
Lauri ལའུ་རི་	Betseling Doongmanma སྦས་རྩ་གླིང་_གདུང་མན་མ་	Betseling
Lauri ལའུ་རི་	Betseling Doongmanma སྦས་རྩ་གླིང་_གདུང་མན་མ་	Doongmanma
Lauri ལའུ་རི་	Gonong Zangthig སྒོ་ནོང་_ཟངས་ཐིག་	Gonong
Lauri ལའུ་རི་	Gonong Zangthig སྒོ་ནོང་_ཟངས་ཐིག་	Serzhong
Lauri ལའུ་རི་	Gonong Zangthig སྒོ་ནོང་_ཟངས་ཐིག་	Tashiphu
Lauri ལའུ་རི་	Gonong Zangthig སྒོ་ནོང་_ཟངས་ཐིག་	Tshephu
Lauri ལའུ་རི་	Tshothang མཚོ་ཐངས་	Tshothang
Martshala མར་ཚྭ་ལ་	Chhoedoong Kakani ཆོས་དུང་_ཀ་ཀ་ནི་	Chhoedoong
Martshala མར་ཚྭ་ལ་	Chhoedoong Kakani ཆོས་དུང་_ཀ་ཀ་ནི་	Chongmashing
Martshala མར་ཚྭ་ལ་	Chhoedoong Kakani ཆོས་དུང་_ཀ་ཀ་ནི་	Kakani
Martshala མར་ཚྭ་ལ་	Sarjoong གསར་འབྱུང་	Sarjoong
Martshala མར་ཚྭ་ལ་	Sarjoong གསར་འབྱུང་	Shem Shem
Martshala མར་ཚྭ་ལ་	Martshala མར་ཚྭ་ལ་	Doongmanma
Martshala མར་ཚྭ་ལ་	Martshala མར་ཚྭ་ལ་	Gorthongma
Martshala མར་ཚྭ་ལ་	Martshala མར་ཚྭ་ལ་	Kakpadoong
Martshala མར་ཚྭ་ལ་	Martshala མར་ཚྭ་ལ་	Martshala
Martshala མར་ཚྭ་ལ་	Martshala མར་ཚྭ་ལ་	Thizor
Martshala མར་ཚྭ་ལ་	Galingkhar Wangphoog དགའ་གླིང་མཁར་_ཝང་ཕུག་	Galingkhar
Martshala མར་ཚྭ་ལ་	Galingkhar Wangphoog དགའ་གླིང་མཁར་_ཝང་ཕུག་	Khalingdangre/Galingkhar
Martshala མར་ཚྭ་ལ་	Galingkhar Wangphoog དགའ་གླིང་མཁར་_ཝང་ཕུག་	Wargphoog
Martshala མར་ཚྭ་ལ་	Kaeptang Tsholingkhar ཀེབ་སྟང་_མཚོ་གླིང་མཁར་	Dengshingzor
Martshala མར་ཚྭ་ལ་	Kaeptang Tsholingkhar ཀེབ་སྟང་_མཚོ་གླིང་མཁར་	Kaeptang
Martshala མར་ཚྭ་ལ་	Kaeptang Tsholingkhar ཀེབ་སྟང་_མཚོ་གླིང་མཁར་	Pelrithang
Martshala མར་ཚྭ་ལ་	Kaeptang Tsholingkhar ཀེབ་སྟང་_མཚོ་གླིང་མཁར་	Rechanglu
Martshala མར་ཚྭ་ལ་	Kaeptang Tsholingkhar ཀེབ་སྟང་_མཚོ་གླིང་མཁར་	Tsholingkhar
Martshala མར་ཚྭ་ལ་	Suzor Tshotsalu སུ་ཟོར་_མཚོ་ཙ་ལུ་	Loongbaktang
Martshala མར་ཚྭ་ལ་	Suzor Tshotsalu སུ་ཟོར་_མཚོ་ཙ་ལུ་	Raushing
Martshala མར་ཚྭ་ལ་	Suzor Tshotsalu སུ་ཟོར་_མཚོ་ཙ་ལུ་	Suzor
Martshala མར་ཚྭ་ལ་	Suzor Tshotsalu སུ་ཟོར་_མཚོ་ཙ་ལུ་	Thongpashing
Martshala མར་ཚྭ་ལ་	Suzor Tshotsalu སུ་ཟོར་_མཚོ་ཙ་ལུ་	Tshongpashing
Orong ཨོ་རོང་	Rimoong རི་མུང་	Rimoong
Orong ཨོ་རོང་	Rimoong རི་མུང་	Thungshing
Orong ཨོ་རོང་	Jangchhubling བྱང་ཆུབ་གླིང་	Jangchhubling
Orong ཨོ་རོང་	Jangchhubling བྱང་ཆུབ་གླིང་	Mandar
Orong ཨོ་རོང་	Jangchhubling བྱང་ཆུབ་གླིང་	Phetong
Orong ཨོ་རོང་	Jangchhubling བྱང་ཆུབ་གླིང་	Redumed
Orong ཨོ་རོང་	Nabar Philooma ན་སྦར་_ཕི་ལུ་མ་	Batshoong
Orong ཨོ་རོང་	Nabar Philooma ན་སྦར་_ཕི་ལུ་མ་	Nagzor
Orong ཨོ་རོང་	Nabar Philooma ན་སྦར་_ཕི་ལུ་མ་	Wooling
Orong ཨོ་རོང་	Bilam Orong Suzoong སྦིས་ལམ་_ཨོ་རོང་_བསུ་གཟོངས་	Menchari
Orong ཨོ་རོང་	Bilam Orong Suzoong སྦིས་ལམ་_ཨོ་རོང་_བསུ་གཟོངས་	Bilam
Orong ཨོ་རོང་	Bilam Orong Suzoong སྦིས་ལམ་_ཨོ་རོང་_བསུ་གཟོངས་	Chongti
Orong ཨོ་རོང་	Bilam Orong Suzoong སྦིས་ལམ་_ཨོ་རོང་_བསུ་གཟོངས་	Durtsun
Orong ཨོ་རོང་	Bilam Orong Suzoong སྦིས་ལམ་_ཨོ་རོང་_བསུ་གཟོངས་	Gonminang
Orong ཨོ་རོང་	Bilam Orong Suzoong སྦིས་ལམ་_ཨོ་རོང་_བསུ་གཟོངས་	Jalamwoong
Orong ཨོ་རོང་	Bilam Orong Suzoong སྦིས་ལམ་_ཨོ་རོང་_བསུ་གཟོངས་	Malang
Orong ཨོ་རོང་	Bilam Orong Suzoong སྦིས་ལམ་_ཨོ་རོང་_བསུ་གཟོངས་	Mantsang
Orong ཨོ་རོང་	Bilam Orong Suzoong སྦིས་ལམ་_ཨོ་རོང་_བསུ་གཟོངས་	Milum
Orong ཨོ་རོང་	Bilam Orong Suzoong སྦིས་ལམ་_ཨོ་རོང་_བསུ་གཟོངས་	Mitseshing
Orong ཨོ་རོང་	Bilam Orong Suzoong སྦིས་ལམ་_ཨོ་རོང་_བསུ་གཟོངས་	Suzoong
Orong ཨོ་རོང་	Bilam Orong Suzoong སྦིས་ལམ་_ཨོ་རོང་_བསུ་གཟོངས་	Tershiri
Orong ཨོ་རོང་	Nagzor Wooling གནག་ཟོར་_འུ་གླིང་	Batshoong
Orong ཨོ་རོང་	Nagzor Wooling གནག་ཟོར་_འུ་གླིང་	Nagzor
Orong ཨོ་རོང་	Nagzor Wooling གནག་ཟོར་_འུ་གླིང་	Wooling
Orong ཨོ་རོང་	Morong མོ་རོང་	Morong
Pemathang པདྨ་ཐང་	Uesarna Warong གཡུ་གསར་ན་_ཝ་རོང་	Uesarna (Nainital)
Pemathang པདྨ་ཐང་	Uesarna Warong གཡུ་གསར་ན་_ཝ་རོང་	Lingmayshong (Tarulay)
Pemathang པདྨ་ཐང་	Uesarna Warong གཡུ་གསར་ན་_ཝ་རོང་	Warong (Warang)
Pemathang པདྨ་ཐང་	Raling ར་གླིང་	Raling (Phedi)
Pemathang པདྨ་ཐང་	Pemathang པདྨ་ཐང་	Pemathang (Beldara)
Pemathang པདྨ་ཐང་	Pemathang པདྨ་ཐང་	Pemathang (Dalim)
Pemathang པདྨ་ཐང་	Chirtshosa Loongminang སྤྱིར་འཚོ་ས་_ལུང་མི་ནང་	Loongminang (Gairitar)
Pemathang པདྨ་ཐང་	Chirtshosa Loongminang སྤྱིར་འཚོ་ས་_ལུང་མི་ནང་	Chirtshosa (Kharbandi)
Pemathang པདྨ་ཐང་	Chirtshosa Loongminang སྤྱིར་འཚོ་ས་_ལུང་མི་ནང་	Pyertshosa (Kharbandi)
Pemathang པདྨ་ཐང་	Kathoobdrang Shilinggye དཀའ་ཐུབ་ཀྲང་_ཤི་གླིང་རྒྱས་	Labtshazor (Deorali)
Pemathang པདྨ་ཐང་	Kathoobdrang Shilinggye དཀའ་ཐུབ་ཀྲང་_ཤི་གླིང་རྒྱས་	Kathoobdang (Diklai)
Pemathang པདྨ་ཐང་	Kathoobdrang Shilinggye དཀའ་ཐུབ་ཀྲང་_ཤི་གླིང་རྒྱས་	Doongkarling (Dumpha)
Pemathang པདྨ་ཐང་	Kathoobdrang Shilinggye དཀའ་ཐུབ་ཀྲང་_ཤི་གླིང་རྒྱས་	Dramzeygang (Kataray)
Pemathang པདྨ་ཐང་	Kathoobdrang Shilinggye དཀའ་ཐུབ་ཀྲང་_ཤི་གླིང་རྒྱས་	Bunakha (Majuwa)
Pemathang པདྨ་ཐང་	Kathoobdrang Shilinggye དཀའ་ཐུབ་ཀྲང་_ཤི་གླིང་རྒྱས་	Yuwathang (Nalapara)
Phuntshothang ཕུན་ཚོགས་ཐང་	Minjigang སྨིན་ཇི་སྒང་	Thongjaling (Jagartala)
Phuntshothang ཕུན་ཚོགས་ཐང་	Minjigang སྨིན་ཇི་སྒང་	Selmonang (Koila)
Phuntshothang ཕུན་ཚོགས་ཐང་	Minjigang སྨིན་ཇི་སྒང་	Balamnang (Nakalitar)
Phuntshothang ཕུན་ཚོགས་ཐང་	Minjigang སྨིན་ཇི་སྒང་	Minjigang (Tekree)
Phuntshothang ཕུན་ཚོགས་ཐང་	Samdrupchhoeling བསམ་གྲུབ་ཆོས་གླིང་	Karmaling (Kataray)
Phuntshothang ཕུན་ཚོགས་ཐང་	Samdrupchhoeling བསམ་གྲུབ་ཆོས་གླིང་	Drupchhugang (Kubindey)
Phuntshothang ཕུན་ཚོགས་ཐང་	Samdrupchhoeling བསམ་གྲུབ་ཆོས་གླིང་	Tshogskorling (Majuwa)
Phuntshothang ཕུན་ཚོགས་ཐང་	Samdrupchhoeling བསམ་གྲུབ་ཆོས་གླིང་	Samdrupchhoeling/Raitar
Phuntshothang ཕུན་ཚོགས་ཐང་	Samdrupchhoeling བསམ་གྲུབ་ཆོས་གླིང་	Thhongsigang (Saureney)
Phuntshothang ཕུན་ཚོགས་ཐང་	Samdrupchhoeling བསམ་གྲུབ་ཆོས་གླིང་	Thangchu Goenpa/Chotaytar
Phuntshothang ཕུན་ཚོགས་ཐང་	Phuentshogthang ཕུན་ཚོགས་ཐང་	Phuentshogthang/Bakuli
Phuntshothang ཕུན་ཚོགས་ཐང་	Phuentshogthang ཕུན་ཚོགས་ཐང་	Tsangchutham/U. Mansitar
Phuntshothang ཕུན་ཚོགས་ཐང་	Baylamsharang སྦེ་ལམ་ཤ་རང་	Baylamsharang
Phuntshothang ཕུན་ཚོགས་ཐང་	Baylamsharang སྦེ་ལམ་ཤ་རང་	Shangshingzor
Phuntshothang ཕུན་ཚོགས་ཐང་	Baylamsharang སྦེ་ལམ་ཤ་རང་	Shukuni/Shangshingzor
Phuntshothang ཕུན་ཚོགས་ཐང་	Khamaedthang ཁ་སྨད་ཐང་	Chhumaedthang (Gauthalay)
Phuntshothang ཕུན་ཚོགས་ཐང་	Khamaedthang ཁ་སྨད་ཐང་	Khamaedthang/Mansitar
Phuntshothang ཕུན་ཚོགས་ཐང་	Doongkarling གདུང་དཀར་གླིང་	Tshochoong (Bauney)
Phuntshothang ཕུན་ཚོགས་ཐང་	Doongkarling གདུང་དཀར་གླིང་	Mendrupling (Bhawaney)
Phuntshothang ཕུན་ཚོགས་ཐང་	Doongkarling གདུང་དཀར་གླིང་	Chhoetseyung (Daurey)
Phuntshothang ཕུན་ཚོགས་ཐང་	Doongkarling གདུང་དཀར་གླིང་	Doongkarling/Dumpha/Gangatay
Phuntshothang ཕུན་ཚོགས་ཐང་	Doongkarling གདུང་དཀར་གླིང་	Zomlaythang (Katikay)
Samrang བསམ་རང་	Ngangtshothang Toed ངང་མཚོ་ཐང་སྟོད་	Ngangtshothang Toed
Samrang བསམ་རང་	Ngangtshothang Maed ངང་མཚོ་ཐང་སྨད་	Ngangtshothang Maed
Samrang བསམ་རང་	Damsagang Toed འདམ་ས་སྒང་སྟོད་	Damsagang Toed
Samrang བསམ་རང་	Damsagang Maed འདམ་ས་སྒང་སྨད་	Damsagang Maed (Hillay)
Samrang བསམ་རང་	Tshoduen མཚོ་བདུན་	Tshoduen (Sathpokari)
Serthi གསེར་ཐིག་	Khandophoog Maenjiwoong མཁའ་འགྲོ་ཐུག་_མན་ཇི་འུང་	Chasakhar/Maenjiwoong
Serthi གསེར་ཐིག་	Khandophoog Maenjiwoong མཁའ་འགྲོ་ཐུག་_མན་ཇི་འུང་	Chemari
Serthi གསེར་ཐིག་	Khandophoog Maenjiwoong མཁའ་འགྲོ་ཐུག་_མན་ཇི་འུང་	Dekorwoong/Khanduphoog
Serthi གསེར་ཐིག་	Khandophoog Maenjiwoong མཁའ་འགྲོ་ཐུག་_མན་ཇི་འུང་	Jab/Khanduphoog
Serthi གསེར་ཐིག་	Khandophoog Maenjiwoong མཁའ་འགྲོ་ཐུག་_མན་ཇི་འུང་	Khanduphoog
Serthi གསེར་ཐིག་	Khandophoog Maenjiwoong མཁའ་འགྲོ་ཐུག་_མན་ཇི་འུང་	Maenjiwoong/Khanduphoog
Serthi གསེར་ཐིག་	Khandophoog Maenjiwoong མཁའ་འགྲོ་ཐུག་_མན་ཇི་འུང་	Maenjiwoongpeka/Khanduphoog
Serthi གསེར་ཐིག་	Khandophoog Maenjiwoong མཁའ་འགྲོ་ཐུག་_མན་ཇི་འུང་	Pangthang/Khanduphoog
Serthi གསེར་ཐིག་	Khandophoog Maenjiwoong མཁའ་འགྲོ་ཐུག་_མན་ཇི་འུང་	Phakchu/Khanduphoog
Serthi གསེར་ཐིག་	Khandophoog Maenjiwoong མཁའ་འགྲོ་ཐུག་_མན་ཇི་འུང་	Sakari/Khanduphoog
Serthi གསེར་ཐིག་	Khandophoog Maenjiwoong མཁའ་འགྲོ་ཐུག་_མན་ཇི་འུང་	Tang Phrang/Khanduphoog
Serthi གསེར་ཐིག་	Khandophoog Maenjiwoong མཁའ་འགྲོ་ཐུག་_མན་ཇི་འུང་	Woong/Khanduphoog
Serthi གསེར་ཐིག་	Drenphoog དྲེན་ཕུག་	Drenphoog
Serthi གསེར་ཐིག་	Drenphoog དྲེན་ཕུག་	Deptsang
Serthi གསེར་ཐིག་	Drenphoog དྲེན་ཕུག་	Pemagatshel
Serthi གསེར་ཐིག་	Phagchhog Suskar འཕགས་མཆོག་_སུས་དཀར་	Junme
Serthi གསེར་ཐིག་	Phagchhog Suskar འཕགས་མཆོག་_སུས་དཀར་	Phachhog
Serthi གསེར་ཐིག་	Phagchhog Suskar འཕགས་མཆོག་_སུས་དཀར་	Suskar
Serthi གསེར་ཐིག་	Dangtsho Serthig དངས་མཚོ་_གསེར་ཐིག་	Dangtsho/Serthig
Serthi གསེར་ཐིག་	Dangtsho Serthig དངས་མཚོ་_གསེར་ཐིག་	Lamkhabjay/Serthig
Serthi གསེར་ཐིག་	Dangtsho Serthig དངས་མཚོ་_གསེར་ཐིག་	Lhakhangzor/Serthig
Serthi གསེར་ཐིག་	Dangtsho Serthig དངས་མཚོ་_གསེར་ཐིག་	Pangthang/Serthig
Serthi གསེར་ཐིག་	Dangtsho Serthig དངས་མཚོ་_གསེར་ཐིག་	Tang Frang/Serthig
Serthi གསེར་ཐིག་	Dangtsho Serthig དངས་མཚོ་_གསེར་ཐིག་	Tangngakpa/Serthig
Serthi གསེར་ཐིག་	Dangtsho Serthig དངས་མཚོ་_གསེར་ཐིག་	Tokari Goenpa/Serthig
Serthi གསེར་ཐིག་	Monmola Tashithanggyed མོན་མོ་ལ་_བཀྲིས་ཐང་བརྒྱད་	Barkalangnang
Serthi གསེར་ཐིག་	Monmola Tashithanggyed མོན་མོ་ལ་_བཀྲིས་ཐང་བརྒྱད་	Rebalingbi
Serthi གསེར་ཐིག་	Monmola Tashithanggyed མོན་མོ་ལ་_བཀྲིས་ཐང་བརྒྱད་	Tashithang Gyed
Serthi གསེར་ཐིག་	Monmola Tashithanggyed མོན་མོ་ལ་_བཀྲིས་ཐང་བརྒྱད་	Dhukha/Monmola
Serthi གསེར་ཐིག་	Monmola Tashithanggyed མོན་མོ་ལ་_བཀྲིས་ཐང་བརྒྱད་	Khuwangka/Monmola
Serthi གསེར་ཐིག་	Monmola Tashithanggyed མོན་མོ་ལ་_བཀྲིས་ཐང་བརྒྱད་	Goenpa/Monmola
Serthi གསེར་ཐིག་	Monmola Tashithanggyed མོན་མོ་ལ་_བཀྲིས་ཐང་བརྒྱད་	Pangthang/Monmola
Serthi གསེར་ཐིག་	Monmola Tashithanggyed མོན་མོ་ལ་_བཀྲིས་ཐང་བརྒྱད་	Thujaycheling/Monmola
Serthi གསེར་ཐིག་	Monmola Tashithanggyed མོན་མོ་ལ་_བཀྲིས་ཐང་བརྒྱད་	Zor/Monmola
Wangphu ཝང་ཕུག་	Sachhilo ས་ཆི་ལོ་	Sachhilo
Wangphu ཝང་ཕུག་	Bayuel Pangthang སྦ་གཡུལ་_སྦང་ཐང་	Bayuel
Wangphu ཝང་ཕུག་	Bayuel Pangthang སྦ་གཡུལ་_སྦང་ཐང་	Shoguwoong
Wangphu ཝང་ཕུག་	Bayuel Pangthang སྦ་གཡུལ་_སྦང་ཐང་	Shokshi Pangthang
Wangphu ཝང་ཕུག་	Shogshi ཤོག་ཤི་	Khainorong/Shogshi
Wangphu ཝང་ཕུག་	Shogshi ཤོག་ཤི་	Lingsum/Shogshi
Wangphu ཝང་ཕུག་	Shogshi ཤོག་ཤི་	Manidangre/Shogshi
Wangphu ཝང་ཕུག་	Shogshi ཤོག་ཤི་	Shogshi
Wangphu ཝང་ཕུག་	Serchhenmo Wangphoog གསེར་ཆེན་མོ་_ཝང་ཕུག་	Serchhenmo
Wangphu ཝང་ཕུག་	Serchhenmo Wangphoog གསེར་ཆེན་མོ་_ཝང་ཕུག་	Haila
Wangphu ཝང་ཕུག་	Serchhenmo Wangphoog གསེར་ཆེན་མོ་_ཝང་ཕུག་	Langnang Ringmo/Wangphoog
Wangphu ཝང་ཕུག་	Serchhenmo Wangphoog གསེར་ཆེན་མོ་_ཝང་ཕུག་	Wangphoog
Wangphu ཝང་ཕུག་	Benporong Yarphoog བེན་པོ་རོང་_ཡར་ཐུག་	Benporong
Wangphu ཝང་ཕུག་	Singsiborang	
Wangphu ཝང་ཕུག་	Yarphoog	

=== Samtse District ===
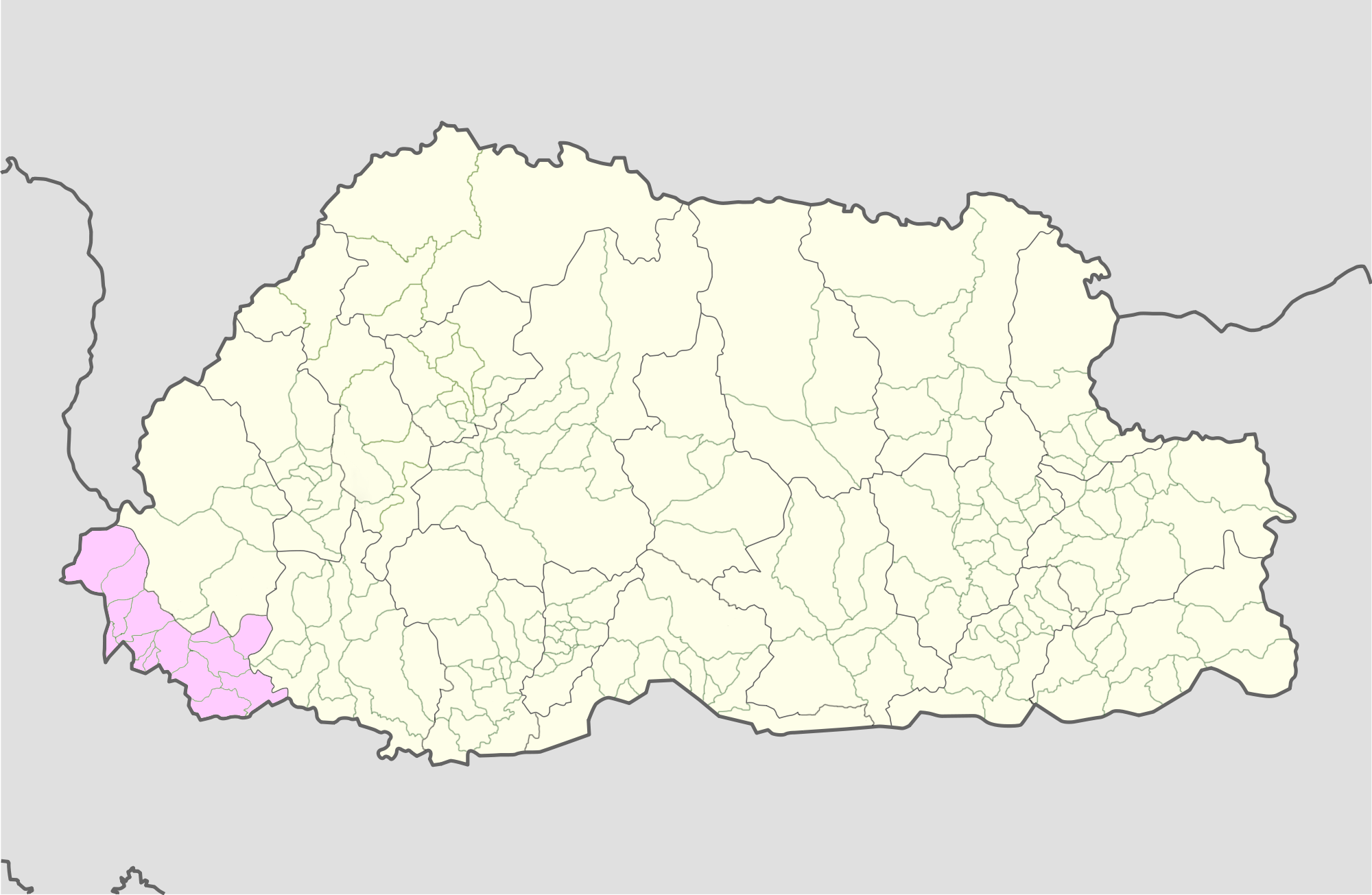
Samtse District

Gewog	Chiwog	Village
Dungtoe གདུང་སྟོད་	Doongtoed Chhewa གདུང་སྟོད་ཆེ་བ་	Doongtoed Chhewa (Thulo Doomtoed)
Dungtoe གདུང་སྟོད་	Doongtoed Chhungwa Jarikha གདུང་སྟོད་ཆུང་བ་_འཇའ་རི་ཁ་	Jarikha (Jaringay)
Dungtoe གདུང་སྟོད་	Doongtoed Chhungwa Jarikha གདུང་སྟོད་ཆུང་བ་_འཇའ་རི་ཁ་	Doomtoed Chhungwa (Sanu Doomtoed)
Dungtoe གདུང་སྟོད་	Maedgang སྨད་སྒང་	Gairigaon
Dungtoe གདུང་སྟོད་	Doongtoed Khaling གདུང་སྟོད་_ཁ་གླིང་	Doomtoed (Daragon)
Dungtoe གདུང་སྟོད་	Doongtoed Khaling གདུང་སྟོད་_ཁ་གླིང་	Khaling (Khaling Goan)
Dungtoe གདུང་སྟོད་	Gebji Kuzhuggang གྱེབ་སྦྱི་_སྐུ་བཞུགས་སྒང་	Kuzhuggang (Kuchey)
Dophoogchen རྡོ་ཕུག་ཅན་	Aringgang Midzomsa ཨ་རིང་སྒང་_མི་འཛོམས་ས་	Gangtokha (Daragaon)
Dophoogchen རྡོ་ཕུག་ཅན་	Aringgang Midzomsa ཨ་རིང་སྒང་_མི་འཛོམས་ས་	Bamengang (Mithun)
Dophoogchen རྡོ་ཕུག་ཅན་	Aringgang Midzomsa ཨ་རིང་སྒང་_མི་འཛོམས་ས་	Mizomsa (Somlachen)
Dophoogchen རྡོ་ཕུག་ཅན་	Aringgang Midzomsa ཨ་རིང་སྒང་_མི་འཛོམས་ས་	Aringgang (Tarigaon)
Dophoogchen རྡོ་ཕུག་ཅན་	Dangreyboog Ngagang དྭངས་རས་སྦུག་_རྔ་སྒང་	Dangreyboog Ka (Beachgaon A)
Dophoogchen རྡོ་ཕུག་ཅན་	Dangreyboog Ngagang དྭངས་རས་སྦུག་_རྔ་སྒང་	Dangreyboog Kha (Beachgoan)
Dophoogchen རྡོ་ཕུག་ཅན་	Dangreyboog Ngagang དྭངས་རས་སྦུག་_རྔ་སྒང་	Chilumchen (Chelumchen)
Dophoogchen རྡོ་ཕུག་ཅན་	Dangreyboog Ngagang དྭངས་རས་སྦུག་_རྔ་སྒང་	Ngagang (Damphuchen)
Dophoogchen རྡོ་ཕུག་ཅན་	Dangreyboog Ngagang དྭངས་རས་སྦུག་_རྔ་སྒང་	Dokarkha Ka (Dorokha A)
Dophoogchen རྡོ་ཕུག་ཅན་	Dangreyboog Ngagang དྭངས་རས་སྦུག་_རྔ་སྒང་	Dokarkha Kha (DorokhaB)
Dophoogchen རྡོ་ཕུག་ཅན་	Dangreyboog Ngagang དྭངས་རས་སྦུག་_རྔ་སྒང་	Dokarkha Ga (Dorokha C)
Dophoogchen རྡོ་ཕུག་ཅན་	Dangreyboog Ngagang དྭངས་རས་སྦུག་_རྔ་སྒང་	Namchu
Dophoogchen རྡོ་ཕུག་ཅན་	Manigang Thingyersa མ་ཎི་སྒང་_ཐིང་གཡེར་ས་	Chhuka (Basantey)
Dophoogchen རྡོ་ཕུག་ཅན་	Manigang Thingyersa མ་ཎི་སྒང་_ཐིང་གཡེར་ས་	Manigang (Maney A)
Dophoogchen རྡོ་ཕུག་ཅན་	Manigang Thingyersa མ་ཎི་སྒང་_ཐིང་གཡེར་ས་	Manigang (Maney B)
Dophoogchen རྡོ་ཕུག་ཅན་	Manigang Thingyersa མ་ཎི་སྒང་_ཐིང་གཡེར་ས་	Thingyersa (Timburey)
Dophoogchen རྡོ་ཕུག་ཅན་	Manigang Thingyersa མ་ཎི་སྒང་_ཐིང་གཡེར་ས་	Dograp (Dogap)
Dophoogchen རྡོ་ཕུག་ཅན་	Melonggang Thuloonggang མེ་ལོང་སྒང་_མཐུ་ལུང་སྒང་	Melonggang (Sebichang)
Dophoogchen རྡོ་ཕུག་ཅན་	Melonggang Thuloonggang མེ་ལོང་སྒང་_མཐུ་ལུང་སྒང་	Thuloonggang
Dophoogchen རྡོ་ཕུག་ཅན་	Sangloong Senteng གསང་ལུང་_སེང་སྟེང་	Legpagang (Lapchey Goan)
Dophoogchen རྡོ་ཕུག་ཅན་	Sangloong Senteng གསང་ལུང་_སེང་སྟེང་	Tengdelshong (Satakha)
Dophoogchen རྡོ་ཕུག་ཅན་	Sangloong Senteng གསང་ལུང་_སེང་སྟེང་	Sengteng
Dophoogchen རྡོ་ཕུག་ཅན་	Sangloong Senteng གསང་ལུང་_སེང་སྟེང་	Sangloong
Dophoogchen རྡོ་ཕུག་ཅན་	Singye སེ་དྒེ་	Jigme
Dophoogchen རྡོ་ཕུག་ཅན་	Singye སེ་དྒེ་	Singye
Dophoogchen རྡོ་ཕུག་ཅན་	Singye སེ་དྒེ་	Wangchuck
Duenchukha བདུམ་ཅུ་ཁ་	Biloong Pongthra བི་ལུང་_སྤུངས་ཁྲ་	Benyekha (Benekha)
Duenchukha བདུམ་ཅུ་ཁ་	Biloong Pongthra བི་ལུང་_སྤུངས་ཁྲ་	Poongthra A
Duenchukha བདུམ་ཅུ་ཁ་	Biloong Pongthra བི་ལུང་_སྤུངས་ཁྲ་	Poongthra B
Duenchukha བདུམ་ཅུ་ཁ་	Gesarling Yomdeling གེ་སར་གླིང་_གཡོ་མེད་གླིང་	Drameling (Dhamiley)
Duenchukha བདུམ་ཅུ་ཁ་	Gesarling Yomdeling གེ་སར་གླིང་_གཡོ་མེད་གླིང་	Yomeling (Mayona)
Duenchukha བདུམ་ཅུ་ཁ་	Gesarling Yomdeling གེ་སར་གླིང་_གཡོ་མེད་གླིང་	Mayona (Dhamiley)
Duenchukha བདུམ་ཅུ་ཁ་	Gesarling Yomdeling གེ་སར་གླིང་_གཡོ་མེད་གླིང་	Gesarling (Boribotey)
Duenchukha བདུམ་ཅུ་ཁ་	Dhuenchhukha Gabji བདུན་ཅུ་ཁ་_དགའ་སྦྱིས་	Duenchhukha (Denchukha)
Duenchukha བདུམ་ཅུ་ཁ་	Dhuenchhukha Gabji བདུན་ཅུ་ཁ་_དགའ་སྦྱིས་	Gabji
Duenchukha བདུམ་ཅུ་ཁ་	Dhuenchhukha Gabji བདུན་ཅུ་ཁ་_དགའ་སྦྱིས་	Duenchhukha (Gajbee)
Duenchukha བདུམ་ཅུ་ཁ་	Domchhukha Shitakha དོམ་ཆུ་ཁ་_ཤི་ཏ་ཁ་	Domchhukha (Bhalukhola)
Duenchukha བདུམ་ཅུ་ཁ་	Domchhukha Shitakha དོམ་ཆུ་ཁ་_ཤི་ཏ་ཁ་	Relukha
Duenchukha བདུམ་ཅུ་ཁ་	Domchhukha Shitakha དོམ་ཆུ་ཁ་_ཤི་ཏ་ཁ་	Shetakha
Duenchukha བདུམ་ཅུ་ཁ་	Gawaling Karzhing དགའ་བ་གླིང་_དཀར་ཞིང་	Gawaling (Baseni)
Duenchukha བདུམ་ཅུ་ཁ་	Gawaling Karzhing དགའ་བ་གླིང་_དཀར་ཞིང་	Phazhing (Beteni)
Duenchukha བདུམ་ཅུ་ཁ་	Gawaling Karzhing དགའ་བ་གླིང་_དཀར་ཞིང་	Damji (Damjee)
Duenchukha བདུམ་ཅུ་ཁ་	Gawaling Karzhing དགའ་བ་གླིང་_དཀར་ཞིང་	Kharzhing (Kadori)
Duenchukha བདུམ་ཅུ་ཁ་	Gawaling Karzhing དགའ་བ་གླིང་_དཀར་ཞིང་	Khempaling (Khempa)
Namgaychhoeling རྣམ་རྒྱས་ཆོས་གླིང་	Gyalposhing Satsangsa རྒྱལ་པོ་ཤིང་_ས་གཙང་ས་	Gyalposhing (Raja Rukh)
Namgaychhoeling རྣམ་རྒྱས་ཆོས་གླིང་	Gyalposhing Satsangsa རྒྱལ་པོ་ཤིང་_ས་གཙང་ས་	Satsangsa (Majuwa)
Namgaychhoeling རྣམ་རྒྱས་ཆོས་གླིང་	Sernyagang Tsholingkhar གསེར་ཉ་སྒང་_མཚོ་གླིང་མཁར་	Gangtog (Gyanthok)
Namgaychhoeling རྣམ་རྒྱས་ཆོས་གླིང་	Sernyagang Tsholingkhar གསེར་ཉ་སྒང་_མཚོ་གླིང་མཁར་	Sernyagang (Kholakharka)
Namgaychhoeling རྣམ་རྒྱས་ཆོས་གླིང་	Sernyagang Tsholingkhar གསེར་ཉ་སྒང་_མཚོ་གླིང་མཁར་	Tsholingkhar (Pokhari Dara)
Namgaychhoeling རྣམ་རྒྱས་ཆོས་གླིང་	Chhunaggang Chhoedleling ཆུ་ནག་སྒང་_ཆོས་སྡེ་གླིང་	Chhoedagling (Choksa)
Namgaychhoeling རྣམ་རྒྱས་ཆོས་གླིང་	Chhunaggang Chhoedleling ཆུ་ནག་སྒང་_ཆོས་སྡེ་གླིང་	Chhunaggang (Kalikhola)
Namgaychhoeling རྣམ་རྒྱས་ཆོས་གླིང་	Pagshingkha Tshachhugang སྤག་ཤིང་ཁ་_ཚྭ་ཆུ་སྒང་	Pagshingkha (Malbasay)
Namgaychhoeling རྣམ་རྒྱས་ཆོས་གླིང་	Pagshingkha Tshachhugang སྤག་ཤིང་ཁ་_ཚྭ་ཆུ་སྒང་	Tshachhungang (Noonpani)
Namgaychhoeling རྣམ་རྒྱས་ཆོས་གླིང་	Pagshingkha Tshachhugang སྤག་ཤིང་ཁ་_ཚྭ་ཆུ་སྒང་	Tshosarling (Rangedara)
Namgaychhoeling རྣམ་རྒྱས་ཆོས་གླིང་	Namgaychhoeling རྣམ་རྒྱས་ཆོས་གླིང་	Namgay Chhoeling
Norbugang ནོར་བུ་སྒང་	Lambi Lamjosa ལམ་སྦིས་_ལམ་འགྱོ་ས་	Labmi (Lamjee)
Norbugang ནོར་བུ་སྒང་	Lambi Lamjosa ལམ་སྦིས་_ལམ་འགྱོ་ས་	Lamjosa (Lamjumsa)
Norbugang ནོར་བུ་སྒང་	Lambi Lamjosa ལམ་སྦིས་_ལམ་འགྱོ་ས་	Jarigang (Merik)
Norbugang ནོར་བུ་སྒང་	Lambi Lamjosa ལམ་སྦིས་_ལམ་འགྱོ་ས་	Tsheringang (Nangla Dang)
Norbugang ནོར་བུ་སྒང་	Dramzedgang Maedgang བྲམ་ཟེ་སྒང་_སྨད་སྒང་	Madgang (Gairigaon)
Norbugang ནོར་བུ་སྒང་	Dramzedgang Maedgang བྲམ་ཟེ་སྒང་_སྨད་སྒང་	Kyidtsaling (Dhapper)
Norbugang ནོར་བུ་སྒང་	Khangduzhi Kyidsa ཁང་གྲུ་བཞི་_སྐྱིང་ས་	Khangduzhi (Kopchey)
Norbugang ནོར་བུ་སྒང་	Khangduzhi Kyidsa ཁང་གྲུ་བཞི་_སྐྱིང་ས་	Kyidsa (Kirney)
Norbugang ནོར་བུ་སྒང་	Khangduzhi Kyidsa ཁང་གྲུ་བཞི་_སྐྱིང་ས་	Kyedsa (Kothidara/Kirney)
Norbugang ནོར་བུ་སྒང་	Dawaling Yangphelthang ཟླ་བ་གླིང་_གཡང་འཕེལ་ཐང་	Gangtosa (Kothidara)
Norbugang ནོར་བུ་སྒང་	Dawaling Yangphelthang ཟླ་བ་གླིང་_གཡང་འཕེལ་ཐང་	Dramzigang (Kataray)
Norbugang ནོར་བུ་སྒང་	Dawaling Yangphelthang ཟླ་བ་གླིང་_གཡང་འཕེལ་ཐང་	Tshongduekha (Hatkhola)
Norbugang ནོར་བུ་སྒང་	Dawaling Yangphelthang ཟླ་བ་གླིང་_གཡང་འཕེལ་ཐང་	Dawaling (Maghay)
Norbugang ནོར་བུ་སྒང་	Dawaling Yangphelthang ཟླ་བ་གླིང་_གཡང་འཕེལ་ཐང་	Yangphilthang (Bhimtar)
Norbugang ནོར་བུ་སྒང་	Damzhagsa Tsaphelthang བསྡང་བཞག་ས་_ཙྭ་འཕེལ་ཐང་	Damzagsa (Dipujora)
Norbugang ནོར་བུ་སྒང་	Damzhagsa Tsaphelthang བསྡང་བཞག་ས་_ཙྭ་འཕེལ་ཐང་	Thorila Thumkey
Norbugang ནོར་བུ་སྒང་	Damzhagsa Tsaphelthang བསྡང་བཞག་ས་_ཙྭ་འཕེལ་ཐང་	Norboogang (Tinteray)
Norbugang ནོར་བུ་སྒང་	Damzhagsa Tsaphelthang བསྡང་བཞག་ས་_ཙྭ་འཕེལ་ཐང་	Tsaphelthang (Nabukharka)
Norgaygang ནོར་རྒྱས་སྒང་	Chongzhu Tshachhu བཅོང་་བཞ་_ཚྭ་ཆུ་	Tshachhu
Norgaygang ནོར་རྒྱས་སྒང་	Chongzhu Tshachhu བཅོང་་བཞ་_ཚྭ་ཆུ་	Chongzhu
Norgaygang ནོར་རྒྱས་སྒང་	Chhugoo Phendegang ཆུ་འགུ་_ཕན་སྡེ་སྒང་	Chhu Goo (Chingu)
Norgaygang ནོར་རྒྱས་སྒང་	Chhugoo Phendegang ཆུ་འགུ་_ཕན་སྡེ་སྒང་	Phendegang (Fenchi)
Norgaygang ནོར་རྒྱས་སྒང་	Khabaabgang Noryog ཁ་འབབ་སྒང་_ནོར་གཡོག་	Noryog
Norgaygang ནོར་རྒྱས་སྒང་	Khabaabgang Noryog ཁ་འབབ་སྒང་_ནོར་གཡོག་	Khababgang (Thika)
Norgaygang ནོར་རྒྱས་སྒང་	Joenpang Lingarnang མགྱོན་སྤང་_གླིང་གར་ནང་	Joenpang
Norgaygang ནོར་རྒྱས་སྒང་	Joenpang Lingarnang མགྱོན་སྤང་_གླིང་གར་ནང་	Linggarnang (Lingtam)
Norgaygang ནོར་རྒྱས་སྒང་	Joenpang Lingarnang མགྱོན་སྤང་_གླིང་གར་ནང་	Satsangma (Majuwa)
Norgaygang ནོར་རྒྱས་སྒང་	Dangreyboog Patshaling དྭངས་རས་སྦུག་_སྤ་ཚ་གླིང་	Patshaling (Beteni)
Norgaygang ནོར་རྒྱས་སྒང་	Dangreyboog Patshaling དྭངས་རས་སྦུག་_སྤ་ཚ་གླིང་	Dangreyboog (Bich Gaon)
Norgaygang ནོར་རྒྱས་སྒང་	Dangreyboog Patshaling དྭངས་རས་སྦུག་_སྤ་ཚ་གླིང་	Ghundagaon
Norgaygang ནོར་རྒྱས་སྒང་	Dangreyboog Patshaling དྭངས་རས་སྦུག་_སྤ་ཚ་གླིང་	Guengaling (Ghunday Gaon)
Norgaygang ནོར་རྒྱས་སྒང་	Dangreyboog Patshaling དྭངས་རས་སྦུག་_སྤ་ཚ་གླིང་	Zhendebgang (Mukheni Gaon)
Norgaygang ནོར་རྒྱས་སྒང་	Miphelgang Samphelgang མི་འཕེལ་སྒང་_མསམ་འཕེལ་སྒང་	Migphelgang (Dhakalgang)
Norgaygang ནོར་རྒྱས་སྒང་	Miphelgang Samphelgang མི་འཕེལ་སྒང་_མསམ་འཕེལ་སྒང་	Karmaling (Kamigoan)
Norgaygang ནོར་རྒྱས་སྒང་	Miphelgang Samphelgang མི་འཕེལ་སྒང་_མསམ་འཕེལ་སྒང་	Samphelgang (Lepchagaon)
Norgaygang ནོར་རྒྱས་སྒང་	Miphelgang Samphelgang མི་འཕེལ་སྒང་_མསམ་འཕེལ་སྒང་	Norgeygang (Lower Bara)
Pemaling པདྨ་གླིང་	Thangchhennang Damtshangna ཐང་ཆེན་ནང་_དམ་ཚང་ན་	Damtshangna (Ahaley)
Pemaling པདྨ་གླིང་	Thangchhennang Damtshangna ཐང་ཆེན་ནང་_དམ་ཚང་ན་	Balsathang (Bimirey)
Pemaling པདྨ་གླིང་	Thangchhennang Damtshangna ཐང་ཆེན་ནང་_དམ་ཚང་ན་	Tamchhaabsa (Birukhola)
Pemaling པདྨ་གླིང་	Thangchhennang Damtshangna ཐང་ཆེན་ནང་_དམ་ཚང་ན་	Thangchhenang (Birutar)
Pemaling པདྨ་གླིང་	Thangchhennang Damtshangna ཐང་ཆེན་ནང་_དམ་ཚང་ན་	Chhujugthang (Chhetritar)
Pemaling པདྨ་གླིང་	Thangchhennang Damtshangna ཐང་ཆེན་ནང་_དམ་ཚང་ན་	Ngadoongsa (Dhengrey)
Pemaling པདྨ་གླིང་	Thangchhennang Damtshangna ཐང་ཆེན་ནང་_དམ་ཚང་ན་	Phagsamthang (Ghondeytar)
Pemaling པདྨ་གླིང་	Thangchhennang Damtshangna ཐང་ཆེན་ནང་_དམ་ཚང་ན་	Darzhingthng (Jagatar)
Pemaling པདྨ་གླིང་	Thangchhennang Damtshangna ཐང་ཆེན་ནང་_དམ་ཚང་ན་	Yurungthang (Khopitar)
Pemaling པདྨ་གླིང་	Thangchhennang Damtshangna ཐང་ཆེན་ནང་_དམ་ཚང་ན་	Lamaithang (Lamatar)
Pemaling པདྨ་གླིང་	Thangchhennang Damtshangna ཐང་ཆེན་ནང་_དམ་ཚང་ན་	Zamthangnang (Sagutar)
Pemaling པདྨ་གླིང་	Thangchhennang Damtshangna ཐང་ཆེན་ནང་_དམ་ཚང་ན་	Gomsumposa (Tinratey)
Pemaling པདྨ་གླིང་	Thangchhennang Damtshangna ཐང་ཆེན་ནང་_དམ་ཚང་ན་	Pekarling (Toribari)
Pemaling པདྨ་གླིང་	Chhusilgang Dramedsa ཆུ་བསིལ་སྒང་_དགྲ་མེད་ས་	Jureygang (Bararay)
Pemaling པདྨ་གླིང་	Chhusilgang Dramedsa ཆུ་བསིལ་སྒང་_དགྲ་མེད་ས་	Khangzhima (Chargharey)
Pemaling པདྨ་གླིང་	Chhusilgang Dramedsa ཆུ་བསིལ་སྒང་_དགྲ་མེད་ས་	Chhusilgang (Chisopani)
Pemaling པདྨ་གླིང་	Chhusilgang Dramedsa ཆུ་བསིལ་སྒང་_དགྲ་མེད་ས་	Tsajnsa Ka (Hatikhara A)
Pemaling པདྨ་གླིང་	Chhusilgang Dramedsa ཆུ་བསིལ་སྒང་_དགྲ་མེད་ས་	Tsajnsa Kha (Hatikhara B)
Pemaling པདྨ་གླིང་	Chhusilgang Dramedsa ཆུ་བསིལ་སྒང་_དགྲ་མེད་ས་	Pemaling (Kamigaon)
Pemaling པདྨ་གླིང་	Chhusilgang Dramedsa ཆུ་བསིལ་སྒང་_དགྲ་མེད་ས་	Dramzeling (Kataray)
Pemaling པདྨ་གླིང་	Chhusilgang Dramedsa ཆུ་བསིལ་སྒང་_དགྲ་མེད་ས་	Dechengang (Sarki Gaon)
Pemaling པདྨ་གླིང་	Chhusilgang Dramedsa ཆུ་བསིལ་སྒང་_དགྲ་མེད་ས་	Chhoekorling (Schooley)
Pemaling པདྨ་གླིང་	Chhusilgang Dramedsa ཆུ་བསིལ་སྒང་_དགྲ་མེད་ས་	Dramedsa (Sepeni)
Pemaling པདྨ་གླིང་	Chhusilgang Dramedsa ཆུ་བསིལ་སྒང་_དགྲ་མེད་ས་	Lungsirma (Sirisey)
Pemaling པདྨ་གླིང་	Chhusilgang Dramedsa ཆུ་བསིལ་སྒང་_དགྲ་མེད་ས་	Chhoetenkha (Deorali)
Pemaling པདྨ་གླིང་	Norgeyling Singdregang ནོར་རྒྱལ་གླིང་_ཤིང་འབྲས་སྒང་	Komaling (Balsey)
Pemaling པདྨ་གླིང་	Norgeyling Singdregang ནོར་རྒྱལ་གླིང་_ཤིང་འབྲས་སྒང་	Singdregang (Jyamirkot)
Pemaling པདྨ་གླིང་	Norgeyling Singdregang ནོར་རྒྱལ་གླིང་_ཤིང་འབྲས་སྒང་	Nyadoesa (Katley)
Pemaling པདྨ་གླིང་	Norgeyling Singdregang ནོར་རྒྱལ་གླིང་_ཤིང་འབྲས་སྒང་	Shing Ngarma (Khamarey)
Pemaling པདྨ་གླིང་	Norgeyling Singdregang ནོར་རྒྱལ་གླིང་_ཤིང་འབྲས་སྒང་	Beyulgang (Kopchey)
Pemaling པདྨ་གླིང་	Norgeyling Singdregang ནོར་རྒྱལ་གླིང་_ཤིང་འབྲས་སྒང་	Tsakethang (Samatar)
Pemaling པདྨ་གླིང་	Norgeyling Singdregang ནོར་རྒྱལ་གླིང་_ཤིང་འབྲས་སྒང་	Lungtensa (Saureni)
Pemaling པདྨ་གླིང་	Norgeyling Singdregang ནོར་རྒྱལ་གླིང་_ཤིང་འབྲས་སྒང་	Norgyeling (Taley)
Pemaling པདྨ་གླིང་	Dizanggang Nakeyling དྲི་བཟང་སྒང་_ནགས་སྐྱེས་གླིང་	Dizanggang (Kophi)
Pemaling པདྨ་གླིང་	Dizanggang Nakeyling དྲི་བཟང་སྒང་_ནགས་སྐྱེས་གླིང་	Nakeyling (Nigurey)
Pemaling པདྨ་གླིང་	Dizanggang Nakeyling དྲི་བཟང་སྒང་_ནགས་སྐྱེས་གླིང་	Neydagling (Dhamigaon)
Pemaling པདྨ་གླིང་	Manigang Tashithang མ་ཎི་སྒང་_བཀྲ་ཤིས་ཐང་	Nyachhabsa (Gangtey)
Pemaling པདྨ་གླིང་	Manigang Tashithang མ་ཎི་སྒང་_བཀྲ་ཤིས་ཐང་	Pangthangjug (Thandey)
Pemaling པདྨ་གླིང་	Manigang Tashithang མ་ཎི་སྒང་_བཀྲ་ཤིས་ཐང་	Manidara
Pemaling པདྨ་གླིང་	Manigang Tashithang མ་ཎི་སྒང་_བཀྲ་ཤིས་ཐང་	Manigang (Manidara/Gangtey)
Pemaling པདྨ་གླིང་	Manigang Tashithang མ་ཎི་སྒང་_བཀྲ་ཤིས་ཐང་	Gatsheling (Baraney)
Pemaling པདྨ་གླིང་	Manigang Tashithang མ་ཎི་སྒང་_བཀྲ་ཤིས་ཐང་	Tashithang (Tachey)
Phuentshogpelri ཕུན་ཚོགས་དབལ་རི་	Gashingma Ketshaelgang Thongjabi དགའ་ཤིང་མ་_སྐྱེད་ཚལ་སྐང་_མཐོང་རྒྱ་སྦི་	Gashingma (Gashing)
Phuentshogpelri ཕུན་ཚོགས་དབལ་རི་	Gashingma Ketshaelgang Thongjabi དགའ་ཤིང་མ་_སྐྱེད་ཚལ་སྐང་_མཐོང་རྒྱ་སྦི་	Goenpakha (Gombadara)
Phuentshogpelri ཕུན་ཚོགས་དབལ་རི་	Gashingma Ketshaelgang Thongjabi དགའ་ཤིང་མ་_སྐྱེད་ཚལ་སྐང་_མཐོང་རྒྱ་སྦི་	Samerchen (Ratey)
Phuentshogpelri ཕུན་ཚོགས་དབལ་རི་	Gashingma Ketshaelgang Thongjabi དགའ་ཤིང་མ་_སྐྱེད་ཚལ་སྐང་_མཐོང་རྒྱ་སྦི་	Ketshaelgang (Thotney)
Phuentshogpelri ཕུན་ཚོགས་དབལ་རི་	Gashingma Ketshaelgang Thongjabi དགའ་ཤིང་མ་_སྐྱེད་ཚལ་སྐང་_མཐོང་རྒྱ་སྦི་	Thongjabi (Thumkey)
Phuentshogpelri ཕུན་ཚོགས་དབལ་རི་	Tashilakha Uelgyalling བཀྲ་ཤིས་ལ་ཁ་_གཡུལ་རྐྱལ་གླིང་	Dewathang (Banstar)
Phuentshogpelri ཕུན་ཚོགས་དབལ་རི་	Tashilakha Uelgyalling བཀྲ་ཤིས་ལ་ཁ་_གཡུལ་རྐྱལ་གླིང་	Uelgyalling (Dolomthang)
Phuentshogpelri ཕུན་ཚོགས་དབལ་རི་	Tashilakha Uelgyalling བཀྲ་ཤིས་ལ་ཁ་_གཡུལ་རྐྱལ་གླིང་	Tashitshe (Lechi)
Phuentshogpelri ཕུན་ཚོགས་དབལ་རི་	Tashilakha Uelgyalling བཀྲ་ཤིས་ལ་ཁ་_གཡུལ་རྐྱལ་གླིང་	Tashilakha (Numilakha)
Phuentshogpelri ཕུན་ཚོགས་དབལ་རི་	Jangchhogling Lachhungthang བྱང་ཕྱོགས་གླིང་_ལ་ཆུང་ཐང་	Doleg (Dholay)
Phuentshogpelri ཕུན་ཚོགས་དབལ་རི་	Jangchhogling Lachhungthang བྱང་ཕྱོགས་གླིང་_ལ་ཆུང་ཐང་	Peldenling (Gomtu)
Phuentshogpelri ཕུན་ཚོགས་དབལ་རི་	Jangchhogling Lachhungthang བྱང་ཕྱོགས་གླིང་_ལ་ཆུང་ཐང་	Lachhuthang (Lahatar)
Phuentshogpelri ཕུན་ཚོགས་དབལ་རི་	Jangchhogling Lachhungthang བྱང་ཕྱོགས་གླིང་_ལ་ཆུང་ཐང་	Jangchhogling (Uttarey)
Phuentshogpelri ཕུན་ཚོགས་དབལ་རི་	Chhunag Doomshinggang ཆུ་གནག་_དུམ་ཤིང་སྒང་	Doomshinggang (Dumshidara)
Phuentshogpelri ཕུན་ཚོགས་དབལ་རི་	Chhunag Doomshinggang ཆུ་གནག་_དུམ་ཤིང་སྒང་	Chhunag (Kalapani)
Phuentshogpelri ཕུན་ཚོགས་དབལ་རི་	Chhunag Doomshinggang ཆུ་གནག་_དུམ་ཤིང་སྒང་	Satorma (Panray)
Phuentshogpelri ཕུན་ཚོགས་དབལ་རི་	Chhunag Doomshinggang ཆུ་གནག་_དུམ་ཤིང་སྒང་	Chhutharsum (Tindharey)
Phuentshogpelri ཕུན་ཚོགས་དབལ་རི་	Nyoenpaling Tingtingma སྨྱོན་པ་གླིང་_ཏིང་ཏིང་མ་	Gaden (Bhotaykharka)
Phuentshogpelri ཕུན་ཚོགས་དབལ་རི་	Nyoenpaling Tingtingma སྨྱོན་པ་གླིང་_ཏིང་ཏིང་མ་	Neygang (Damdara)
Phuentshogpelri ཕུན་ཚོགས་དབལ་རི་	Nyoenpaling Tingtingma སྨྱོན་པ་གླིང་_ཏིང་ཏིང་མ་	Satergang (Khanigaon)
Phuentshogpelri ཕུན་ཚོགས་དབལ་རི་	Nyoenpaling Tingtingma སྨྱོན་པ་གླིང་_ཏིང་ཏིང་མ་	Nyoenpaling
Phuentshogpelri ཕུན་ཚོགས་དབལ་རི་	Nyoenpaling Tingtingma སྨྱོན་པ་གླིང་_ཏིང་ཏིང་མ་	Nyoenpaling
Phuentshogpelri ཕུན་ཚོགས་དབལ་རི་	Nyoenpaling Tingtingma སྨྱོན་པ་གླིང་_ཏིང་ཏིང་མ་	Nyoenpaling
Phuentshogpelri ཕུན་ཚོགས་དབལ་རི་	Nyoenpaling Tingtingma སྨྱོན་པ་གླིང་_ཏིང་ཏིང་མ་	Tingtingma (Titi)
Sangngagchhoeling གསང་སྔགས་ཆོས་གླིང་	Ngoedroobling དངོས་གྲུབ་གླིང་	Ngoedroobling (Sombek A)
Sangngagchhoeling གསང་སྔགས་ཆོས་གླིང་	Ngoedroobling དངོས་གྲུབ་གླིང་	Ngoedroobling (Sombek B)
Sangngagchhoeling གསང་སྔགས་ཆོས་གླིང་	Ngoedroobling དངོས་གྲུབ་གླིང་	Ngoedroobling (Sombek C)
Sangngagchhoeling གསང་སྔགས་ཆོས་གླིང་	Chhuchhungsa Karseling ཆུ་ཆུང་ས་_དཀར་སེལ་གླིང་	Chhuchhungsa (Jitti A)
Sangngagchhoeling གསང་སྔགས་ཆོས་གླིང་	Chhuchhungsa Karseling ཆུ་ཆུང་ས་_དཀར་སེལ་གླིང་	Chhuchhungsa (Jitti B)
Sangngagchhoeling གསང་སྔགས་ཆོས་གླིང་	Chhuchhungsa Karseling ཆུ་ཆུང་ས་_དཀར་སེལ་གླིང་	Chhuchhungsa (Jitti C)
Sangngagchhoeling གསང་སྔགས་ཆོས་གླིང་	Chhuchhungsa Karseling ཆུ་ཆུང་ས་_དཀར་སེལ་གླིང་	Kharselling (Mongargaon)
Sangngagchhoeling གསང་སྔགས་ཆོས་གླིང་	Chhuchhungsa Karseling ཆུ་ཆུང་ས་_དཀར་སེལ་གླིང་	Tharpung (Tharphu)
Sangngagchhoeling གསང་སྔགས་ཆོས་གླིང་	Chhuchhungsa Karseling ཆུ་ཆུང་ས་_དཀར་སེལ་གླིང་	Khangthongsumpa (Tintalay)
Sangngagchhoeling གསང་སྔགས་ཆོས་གླིང་	Joenlegsa Sangngangchhoeling བྱོན་ལེགས་ས་_གསང་སྔགས་ཆོས་གླིང་	Bumpathang (Bahunitar)
Sangngagchhoeling གསང་སྔགས་ཆོས་གླིང་	Joenlegsa Sangngangchhoeling བྱོན་ལེགས་ས་_གསང་སྔགས་ཆོས་གླིང་	Saduzhima (Chargharay A)
Sangngagchhoeling གསང་སྔགས་ཆོས་གླིང་	Joenlegsa Sangngangchhoeling བྱོན་ལེགས་ས་_གསང་སྔགས་ཆོས་གླིང་	Shaduzhima (Cargharay B)
Sangngagchhoeling གསང་སྔགས་ཆོས་གླིང་	Joenlegsa Sangngangchhoeling བྱོན་ལེགས་ས་_གསང་སྔགས་ཆོས་གླིང་	Khangchunggang (Pakhadura)
Sangngagchhoeling གསང་སྔགས་ཆོས་གླིང་	Joenlegsa Sangngangchhoeling བྱོན་ལེགས་ས་_གསང་སྔགས་ཆོས་གླིང་	Joenlegsa (Setipekha)
Sangngagchhoeling གསང་སྔགས་ཆོས་གླིང་	Dephellingtoed Namseling བདེ་འཕེལ་གླིང་_རྣམ་གསལ་གླིང་	Chungthung
Sangngagchhoeling གསང་སྔགས་ཆོས་གླིང་	Dephellingtoed Namseling བདེ་འཕེལ་གླིང་_རྣམ་གསལ་གླིང་	Depheling Toed (Gathiya A)
Sangngagchhoeling གསང་སྔགས་ཆོས་གླིང་	Dephellingtoed Namseling བདེ་འཕེལ་གླིང་_རྣམ་གསལ་གླིང་	Namseling
Sangngagchhoeling གསང་སྔགས་ཆོས་གླིང་	Dephellingmaed Khangzangling བདེ་འཕེལ་གླིང་སྨད་_ཁང་བཟང་གླིང་	Dephelling (Gathiya B)
Sangngagchhoeling གསང་སྔགས་ཆོས་གླིང་	Dephellingmaed Khangzangling བདེ་འཕེལ་གླིང་སྨད་_ཁང་བཟང་གླིང་	Dephelling (Gathiya C)
Sangngagchhoeling གསང་སྔགས་ཆོས་གླིང་	Dephellingmaed Khangzangling བདེ་འཕེལ་གླིང་སྨད་_ཁང་བཟང་གླིང་	Dephelling (Gathiya D)
Sangngagchhoeling གསང་སྔགས་ཆོས་གླིང་	Dephellingmaed Khangzangling བདེ་འཕེལ་གླིང་སྨད་_ཁང་བཟང་གླིང་	Khangzangling (Labarbot)
Sangngagchhoeling གསང་སྔགས་ཆོས་གླིང་	Dephellingmaed Khangzangling བདེ་འཕེལ་གླིང་སྨད་_ཁང་བཟང་གླིང་	Tsangchushong (Latakhola)
Sangngagchhoeling གསང་སྔགས་ཆོས་གླིང་	Dephellingmaed Khangzangling བདེ་འཕེལ་གླིང་སྨད་_ཁང་བཟང་གླིང་	Lingthang (Lengthey)
Sangngagchhoeling གསང་སྔགས་ཆོས་གླིང་	Dephellingmaed Khangzangling བདེ་འཕེལ་གླིང་སྨད་_ཁང་བཟང་གླིང་	Khamzangling (Satvaiya)
Samtse བསམ་རྩེ་	Dewathang Lamaithang བདེ་བ་ཐང་_བླ་མའི་ཐང་	Dewathang (Banstar)
Samtse བསམ་རྩེ་	Dewathang Lamaithang བདེ་བ་ཐང་_བླ་མའི་ཐང་	Serthang (Khalingtar)
Samtse བསམ་རྩེ་	Dewathang Lamaithang བདེ་བ་ཐང་_བླ་མའི་ཐང་	Lamaithang (Lamitar)
Samtse བསམ་རྩེ་	Dewathang Lamaithang བདེ་བ་ཐང་_བླ་མའི་ཐང་	Chathakgang (Sangla)
Samtse བསམ་རྩེ་	Nyimaling Chhirlogsa ཉི་མ་གླིང་_ཕྱིར་ལོག་ས་	Chhirlogsa (Chiloo)
Samtse བསམ་རྩེ་	Nyimaling Chhirlogsa ཉི་མ་གླིང་_ཕྱིར་ལོག་ས་	Nyimaling (Saureni)
Samtse བསམ་རྩེ་	Nyimaling Chhirlogsa ཉི་མ་གླིང་_ཕྱིར་ལོག་ས་	Jangchhogling (Uttary)
Samtse བསམ་རྩེ་	Damtshangma Khandothang དམ་ཚང་མ་_མཁའ་འགྲོ་ཐང་	Damtshangma (Ahalay)
Samtse བསམ་རྩེ་	Damtshangma Khandothang དམ་ཚང་མ་_མཁའ་འགྲོ་ཐང་	Majathang (Budhuney)
Samtse བསམ་རྩེ་	Damtshangma Khandothang དམ་ཚང་མ་_མཁའ་འགྲོ་ཐང་	Dungkarling (Choilicoop)
Samtse བསམ་རྩེ་	Damtshangma Khandothang དམ་ཚང་མ་_མཁའ་འགྲོ་ཐང་	Goenpazor (Gombadara)
Samtse བསམ་རྩེ་	Damtshangma Khandothang དམ་ཚང་མ་_མཁའ་འགྲོ་ཐང་	Khandothang (Mechetar)
Samtse བསམ་རྩེ་	Satshamchhu Tshongdzonm ས་མཚམས་ཆུ_ཚོང་འཛོམས་	Yulu Toed (Bukay A)
Samtse བསམ་རྩེ་	Satshamchhu Tshongdzonm ས་མཚམས་ཆུ_ཚོང་འཛོམས་	Yulu Maed (Bukay B)
Samtse བསམ་རྩེ་	Satshamchhu Tshongdzonm ས་མཚམས་ཆུ_ཚོང་འཛོམས་	Shatshamchhu (Duarpani)
Samtse བསམ་རྩེ་	Satshamchhu Tshongdzonm ས་མཚམས་ཆུ_ཚོང་འཛོམས་	Tshongdzom (Malbasay)
Samtse བསམ་རྩེ་	Satshamchhu Tshongdzonm ས་མཚམས་ཆུ_ཚོང་འཛོམས་	Gawadong (Sukraty)
Samtse བསམ་རྩེ་	Satshamchhu Tshongdzonm ས་མཚམས་ཆུ_ཚོང་འཛོམས་	Kipadong (Sukraty/Bauwandara)
Samtse བསམ་རྩེ་	Satshamchhu Tshongdzonm ས་མཚམས་ཆུ_ཚོང་འཛོམས་	Bugtognang (Bukkay)
Samtse བསམ་རྩེ་	Lingmaithang Taserpo གླིང་མའི་ཐང་_རྟ་སེར་པོ་	Lingmaithang (Lamatar)
Samtse བསམ་རྩེ་	Lingmaithang Taserpo གླིང་མའི་ཐང་_རྟ་སེར་པོ་	Lhakhangpong (Manderlin)
Samtse བསམ་རྩེ་	Lingmaithang Taserpo གླིང་མའི་ཐང་_རྟ་སེར་པོ་	Tsapero (Tasim)
Tading རྟ་སྡིང་	Dangreyboong Nyindooglakha དྭངས་རས་སྦུག་_ཉིན་གདུགས་ལ་ཁ་	Domtshang (Balukoray)
Tading རྟ་སྡིང་	Dangreyboong Nyindooglakha དྭངས་རས་སྦུག་_ཉིན་གདུགས་ལ་ཁ་	Dangraybug (Beachgaon)
Tading རྟ་སྡིང་	Dangreyboong Nyindooglakha དྭངས་རས་སྦུག་_ཉིན་གདུགས་ལ་ཁ་	Gangtokha (Daragaon)
Tading རྟ་སྡིང་	Dangreyboong Nyindooglakha དྭངས་རས་སྦུག་_ཉིན་གདུགས་ལ་ཁ་	Lapchakha
Tading རྟ་སྡིང་	Dangreyboong Nyindooglakha དྭངས་རས་སྦུག་_ཉིན་གདུགས་ལ་ཁ་	Nyindooglakha
Tading རྟ་སྡིང་	Khempagang Panzhing ཁེམ་པ་སྒང་_པཱན་ཞིང་	Khempagang (Khempa Gaon)
Tading རྟ་སྡིང་	Khempagang Panzhing ཁེམ་པ་སྒང་_པཱན་ཞིང་	Panzhing Wogma (Lower Panbari)
Tading རྟ་སྡིང་	Khempagang Panzhing ཁེམ་པ་སྒང་_པཱན་ཞིང་	Damzhagsa (Thunuwa)
Tading རྟ་སྡིང་	Khempagang Panzhing ཁེམ་པ་སྒང་_པཱན་ཞིང་	Panzhing Ghongma (Upper Phanbari)
Tading རྟ་སྡིང་	Thongsa Tobchhenthang མཐོང་ས་_སྟོབས་ཆེནཐང་	Tobchhenthang (Borbotey)
Tading རྟ་སྡིང་	Thongsa Tobchhenthang མཐོང་ས་_སྟོབས་ཆེནཐང་	Sherabling (Jenchu Gaon)
Tading རྟ་སྡིང་	Thongsa Tobchhenthang མཐོང་ས་_སྟོབས་ཆེནཐང་	Thongsa (Ramitey)
Tading རྟ་སྡིང་	Thongsa Tobchhenthang མཐོང་ས་_སྟོབས་ཆེནཐང་	Tababgang (Tabagaon)
Tading རྟ་སྡིང་	Norjangsa Zochhaling ནོར་བྱང་ས་_ཟོ་ཆ་གླིང་	Bugkha (Bucca)
Tading རྟ་སྡིང་	Norjangsa Zochhaling ནོར་བྱང་ས་_ཟོ་ཆ་གླིང་	Jinpathang (Deotey)
Tading རྟ་སྡིང་	Norjangsa Zochhaling ནོར་བྱང་ས་_ཟོ་ཆ་གླིང་	Norjangsa Dangpa (Gairigaon Ek)
Tading རྟ་སྡིང་	Norjangsa Zochhaling ནོར་བྱང་ས་_ཟོ་ཆ་གླིང་	Norjangsa Nyipa (Gairigaon Dho)
Tading རྟ་སྡིང་	Norjangsa Zochhaling ནོར་བྱང་ས་_ཟོ་ཆ་གླིང་	Zochhaling (Sisney)
Tading རྟ་སྡིང་	Tading Tenpaling རྟ་སྡིང་_བསྟེན་པ་གླིང་	Tenpaling (Titring)
Tading རྟ་སྡིང་	Tading Tenpaling རྟ་སྡིང་_བསྟེན་པ་གླིང་	Doogpoling (Kamai Banjang)
Tading རྟ་སྡིང་	Tading Tenpaling རྟ་སྡིང་_བསྟེན་པ་གླིང་	Tading
Tashicholing བཀྲིས་ཙོས་གླིང་	Daaling Gangjoog དངས་གླིང་_གངས་འཇུག་	Gangjoog (Chebju)
Tashicholing བཀྲིས་ཙོས་གླིང་	Daaling Gangjoog དངས་གླིང་_གངས་འཇུག་	Daangling (Pakhagaon)
Tashicholing བཀྲིས་ཙོས་གླིང་	Dewachen Zhiwaling བདེ་བ་ཅན་_ཞི་བ་གླིང་	Zhiwaling (Kothigaon)
Tashicholing བཀྲིས་ཙོས་གླིང་	Dewachen Zhiwaling བདེ་བ་ཅན་_ཞི་བ་གླིང་	Dewachen (Shivalaya)
Tashicholing བཀྲིས་ཙོས་གླིང་	Baepoteng Kangdoongphug སྦས་པོ་སྟེང་_རྐང་དུང་ཕུག་	Bepoteng (Belbotey)
Tashicholing བཀྲིས་ཙོས་གླིང་	Baepoteng Kangdoongphug སྦས་པོ་སྟེང་_རྐང་དུང་ཕུག་	Kangdoongphug (Jogimara)
Tashicholing བཀྲིས་ཙོས་གླིང་	Norjangsa Peljorling ནོར་བྱང་ས་_དཔལ་འབྱོར་གླིང་	Norjangsa (Girigaon)
Tashicholing བཀྲིས་ཙོས་གླིང་	Norjangsa Peljorling ནོར་བྱང་ས་_དཔལ་འབྱོར་གླིང་	Peljorling Toed
Tashicholing བཀྲིས་ཙོས་གླིང་	Norjangsa Peljorling ནོར་བྱང་ས་_དཔལ་འབྱོར་གླིང་	Peljorling Maed
Tashicholing བཀྲིས་ཙོས་གླིང་	Norjangsa Peljorling ནོར་བྱང་ས་_དཔལ་འབྱོར་གླིང་	Jamcholing (Sajbotey)
Tashicholing བཀྲིས་ཙོས་གླིང་	Tashichhoeling བཀྲིས་ཆོས་གླིང་	Tashichhoeling (Sipsu)
Tendruk བསྟང་འབྲུག་	Miglamthang Thagpzosa མིག་ལམ་ཐང་_ཐགཔ་བཟོ་ས་	Miglamthang (N. Bindu)
Tendruk བསྟང་འབྲུག་	Miglamthang Thagpzosa མིག་ལམ་ཐང་_ཐགཔ་བཟོ་ས་	Domdongsa (Balukhop)
Tendruk བསྟང་འབྲུག་	Miglamthang Thagpzosa མིག་ལམ་ཐང་_ཐགཔ་བཟོ་ས་	Miglamthang (N. Bindu)
Tendruk བསྟང་འབྲུག་	Khengtong Targothang ཁེང་སྟོང་_སྟར་གོ་ཐང་	Dangreybug (Bichgaon)
Tendruk བསྟང་འབྲུག་	Khengtong Targothang ཁེང་སྟོང་_སྟར་གོ་ཐང་	Chhermaling (Fita)
Tendruk བསྟང་འབྲུག་	Khengtong Targothang ཁེང་སྟོང་_སྟར་གོ་ཐང་	Khengtong
Tendruk བསྟང་འབྲུག་	Khengtong Targothang ཁེང་སྟོང་_སྟར་གོ་ཐང་	Targothang (Okhar Botey)
Tendruk བསྟང་འབྲུག་	Nyizergang Tendruk ཉི་ཟེར་སྒང་_བསྟན་འབརུག་	Thagpzosa (Dhoreni)
Tendruk བསྟང་འབྲུག་	Nyizergang Tendruk ཉི་ཟེར་སྒང་_བསྟན་འབརུག་	Nyizergang (Ningalay)
Tendruk བསྟང་འབྲུག་	Nyizergang Tendruk ཉི་ཟེར་སྒང་_བསྟན་འབརུག་	Tendruk
Tendruk བསྟང་འབྲུག་	Nyizergang Tendruk ཉི་ཟེར་སྒང་_བསྟན་འབརུག་	Tendrukthang (Tendu Tar)
Tendruk བསྟང་འབྲུག་	Kachhen Kuchhen ཀ་ཆེན་_སྐུ་ཆེན་	Dawthongsa (Jumsiligaon)
Tendruk བསྟང་འབྲུག་	Kachhen Kuchhen ཀ་ཆེན་_སྐུ་ཆེན་	Kuchhengang (Kuchin Parkha)
Tendruk བསྟང་འབྲུག་	Kachhen Kuchhen ཀ་ཆེན་_སྐུ་ཆེན་	Kuchhenthang (Kuchin Tar)
Tendruk བསྟང་འབྲུག་	Kachhen Kuchhen ཀ་ཆེན་_སྐུ་ཆེན་	Kuchhentoed (Kuchin Upper)
Tendruk བསྟང་འབྲུག་	Kachhen Kuchhen ཀ་ཆེན་_སྐུ་ཆེན་	Kachhen (Kachin)
Tendruk བསྟང་འབྲུག་	Dawathang Kuengaling ཟླ་བ་ཐང་_ཀུན་དགའ་གླིང་	Silwaithang (Bakbakey)
Tendruk བསྟང་འབྲུག་	Dawathang Kuengaling ཟླ་བ་ཐང་_ཀུན་དགའ་གླིང་	Dzongsar
Tendruk བསྟང་འབྲུག་	Dawathang Kuengaling ཟླ་བ་ཐང་_ཀུན་དགའ་གླིང་	Dawathang (Jumsatar)
Tendruk བསྟང་འབྲུག་	Dawathang Kuengaling ཟླ་བ་ཐང་_ཀུན་དགའ་གླིང་	Kuengaling (Pakpay)
Tendruk བསྟང་འབྲུག་	Dawathang Kuengaling ཟླ་བ་ཐང་_ཀུན་དགའ་གླིང་	Denpajong (Soureney)
Tendruk བསྟང་འབྲུག་	Dawathang Kuengaling ཟླ་བ་ཐང་_ཀུན་དགའ་གླིང་	Kangzhima (Chargarey)
Tendruk བསྟང་འབྲུག་	Dawathang Kuengaling ཟླ་བ་ཐང་_ཀུན་དགའ་གླིང་	Rangthagling (Jatey)
Ugentse ཨྱོན་རྩེ་	Nyimalung Tharpaling ཉི་མ་ལུང་_ཐར་པ་གླིང་	Serigang (Bhotaykharka)
Ugentse ཨྱོན་རྩེ་	Nyimalung Tharpaling ཉི་མ་ལུང་_ཐར་པ་གླིང་	Nyimalung (Bhotaykharka)
Ugentse ཨྱོན་རྩེ་	Nyimalung Tharpaling ཉི་མ་ལུང་_ཐར་པ་གླིང་	Tharpaling (Majuwa)
Ugentse ཨྱོན་རྩེ་	Dangkarling Dechhengang དངས་དཀར་གླིང་_བདེ་ཆེན་སྒང་	Dangkharling (Bahun Gaon)
Ugentse ཨྱོན་རྩེ་	Dangkarling Dechhengang དངས་དཀར་གླིང་_བདེ་ཆེན་སྒང་	Dechhengang (Rai Gaon)
Ugentse ཨྱོན་རྩེ་	Dangkarling Dechhengang དངས་དཀར་གླིང་_བདེ་ཆེན་སྒང་	Lhendupling (Thakuri Gaon)
Ugentse ཨྱོན་རྩེ་	Kardog དཀར་མདོག་	Kardog
Ugentse ཨྱོན་རྩེ་	Kardog དཀར་མདོག་	Kardog
Ugentse ཨྱོན་རྩེ་	Kardog དཀར་མདོག་	Kardog
Ugentse ཨྱོན་རྩེ་	Dangreyboog Rigpailing དྭངས་རས་སྦུག་_རིག་པའི་གླིང་	Dangreyboog (Bich Gaon A)
Ugentse ཨྱོན་རྩེ་	Dangreyboog Rigpailing དྭངས་རས་སྦུག་_རིག་པའི་གླིང་	Dangreyboog (Bich Gaon)/Khar
Ugentse ཨྱོན་རྩེ་	Dangreyboog Rigpailing དྭངས་རས་སྦུག་_རིག་པའི་གླིང་	Dangreyboog (Bich Gaon)/Tashiding
Ugentse ཨྱོན་རྩེ་	Dangreyboog Rigpailing དྭངས་རས་སྦུག་_རིག་པའི་གླིང་	Dangreyboog (Bich Gaon B)
Ugentse ཨྱོན་རྩེ་	Dangreyboog Rigpailing དྭངས་རས་སྦུག་_རིག་པའི་གླིང་	Rigpaling (Schooldara)
Ugentse ཨྱོན་རྩེ་	Dangreyboog Rigpailing དྭངས་རས་སྦུག་_རིག་པའི་གླིང་	Schooldara/Tashiding
Ugentse ཨྱོན་རྩེ་	Jarithang རྒྱ་རི་ཐང་	Dangreyboog (Bich Gaon A)/Jangsa
Ugentse ཨྱོན་རྩེ་	Jarithang རྒྱ་རི་ཐང་	Jarithang Toed (Jarip A)
Ugentse ཨྱོན་རྩེ་	Jarithang རྒྱ་རི་ཐང་	Jarithang Maed (Jarip B)
Ugentse ཨྱོན་རྩེ་	Jarithang རྒྱ་རི་ཐང་	Jarithang (Jarip C)
Ugentse ཨྱོན་རྩེ་	Jarithang རྒྱ་རི་ཐང་	Jarip/Ngatshang
Yoeseltse འོད་གསལ་རྩེ་	Zurigang Jigmedthang ཟུར་རི་སྒང་_འཇིགས་མེད་ཐང་	Zurigang (Ghalley Gaon)
Yoeseltse འོད་གསལ་རྩེ་	Zurigang Jigmedthang ཟུར་རི་སྒང་_འཇིགས་མེད་ཐང་	Jigmedthang (Lamitar)
Yoeseltse འོད་གསལ་རྩེ་	Zurigang Jigmedthang ཟུར་རི་སྒང་_འཇིགས་མེད་ཐང་	Sengeyling (Singidara)
Yoeseltse འོད་གསལ་རྩེ་	Pelkithang Rangjoongling དཔལ་སྐྱིད་ཐང་_རང་འབྱུང་གླིང་	Pelkithang (Kataharey)
Yoeseltse འོད་གསལ་རྩེ་	Pelkithang Rangjoongling དཔལ་སྐྱིད་ཐང་_རང་འབྱུང་གླིང་	Ranjoongling (Suntalabari)
Yoeseltse འོད་གསལ་རྩེ་	Dungkar དུང་དཀར་	Samtenchhu (Khola Ghari)
Yoeseltse འོད་གསལ་རྩེ་	Dungkar དུང་དཀར་	Tsakaling (Ghumauney A)
Yoeseltse འོད་གསལ་རྩེ་	Dungkar དུང་དཀར་	Tsakaling
Yoeseltse འོད་གསལ་རྩེ་	Dungkar དུང་དཀར་	Choekiling (Gairigaon)
Yoeseltse འོད་གསལ་རྩེ་	Dungkar དུང་དཀར་	Dungkar (Khumaune B)
Yoeseltse འོད་གསལ་རྩེ་	Koenchhogling Soenakha དཀོན་མཆོག་གླིང་_བསོད་ན་མཁར་	Koenchogling (Kuchi Daina)
Yoeseltse འོད་གསལ་རྩེ་	Koenchhogling Soenakha དཀོན་མཆོག་གླིང་_བསོད་ན་མཁར་	Guma (Nau Number)
Yoeseltse འོད་གསལ་རྩེ་	Koenchhogling Soenakha དཀོན་མཆོག་གླིང་_བསོད་ན་མཁར་	Soenakhar
Yoeseltse འོད་གསལ་རྩེ་	Rinchhenphoog Samtenchhu རིན་ཆེན་ཕུག་_བསམ་གཏན་ཆུ་	Richhenphoog (Kharbandi)
Yoeseltse འོད་གསལ་རྩེ་	Rinchhenphoog Samtenchhu རིན་ཆེན་ཕུག་_བསམ་གཏན་ཆུ་	Kinzangling
Yoeseltse འོད་གསལ་རྩེ་	Rinchhenphoog Samtenchhu རིན་ཆེན་ཕུག་_བསམ་གཏན་ཆུ་	Zoepaling (Jarip)

=== Sarpang District ===
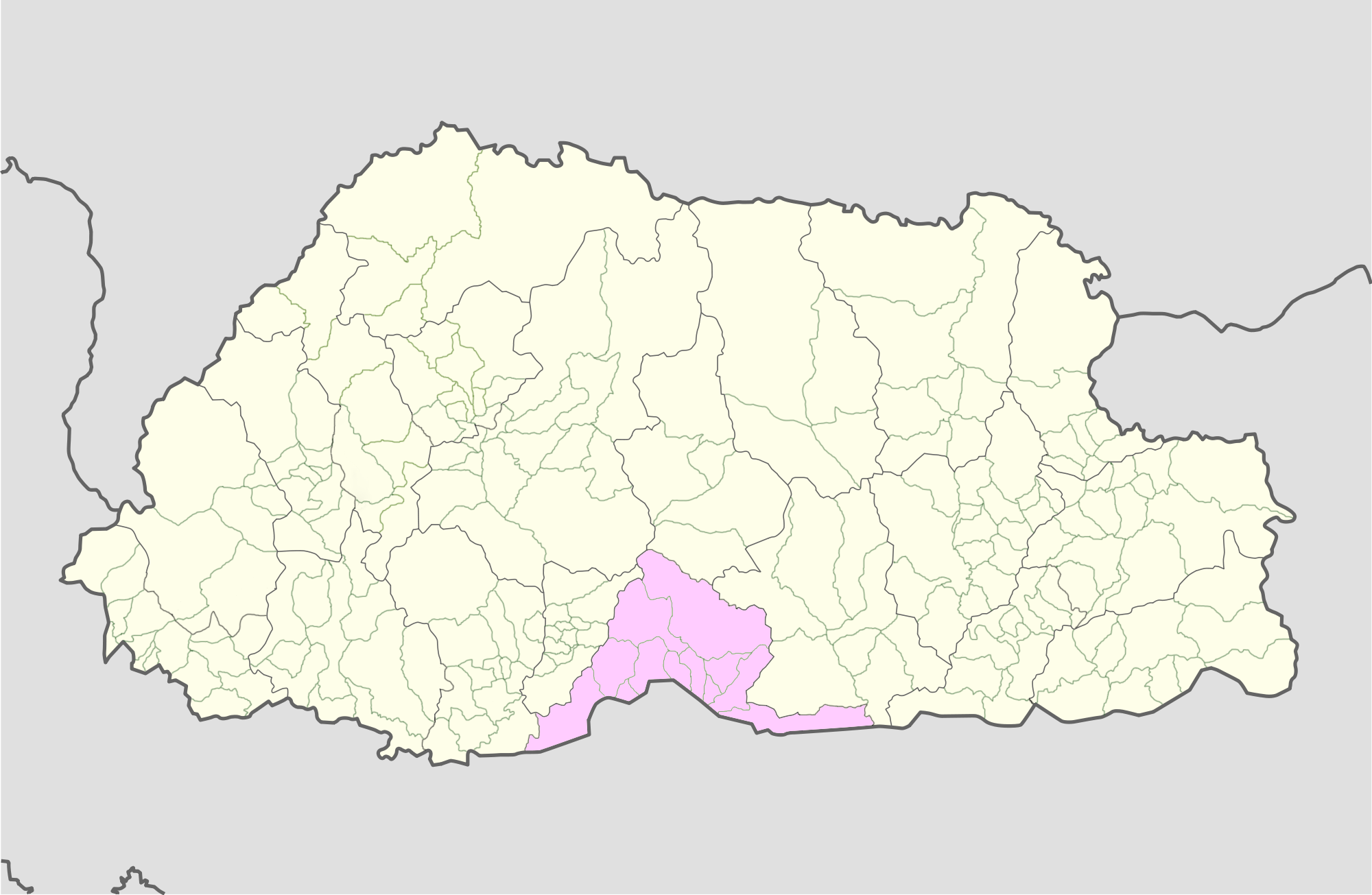
Sarpang District

Gewog	Chiwog	Village
Chhuzagang ཆུ་འཛག་སྒང་	Chagsakhar ལྕགས་ས་མཁར་	Chagsakhar
Chhuzagang ཆུ་འཛག་སྒང་	Chagsakhar ལྕགས་ས་མཁར་	Chagsakhar (Danabari)
Chhuzagang ཆུ་འཛག་སྒང་	Chagsakhar ལྕགས་ས་མཁར་	Chagsakhar (Dawathang)
Chhuzagang ཆུ་འཛག་སྒང་	Chagsakhar ལྕགས་ས་མཁར་	Chagsakhar (Kalikhola)
Chhuzagang ཆུ་འཛག་སྒང་	Chagsakhar ལྕགས་ས་མཁར་	Chagsakhar (Limbutar)
Chhuzagang ཆུ་འཛག་སྒང་	Chagsakhar ལྕགས་ས་མཁར་	Chagsakhar (Somitar)
Chhuzagang ཆུ་འཛག་སྒང་	Chagsakhar ལྕགས་ས་མཁར་	Chagsakhar (Thewar)
Chhuzagang ཆུ་འཛག་སྒང་	Pangzor སྤང་ཟོར་	Pangzor
Chhuzagang ཆུ་འཛག་སྒང་	Pangzor སྤང་ཟོར་	Pangzor (Danabari)
Chhuzagang ཆུ་འཛག་སྒང་	Pangzor སྤང་ཟོར་	Pangzor (Daragoan)
Chhuzagang ཆུ་འཛག་སྒང་	Pangzor སྤང་ཟོར་	Pangzor (Kalikhola)
Chhuzagang ཆུ་འཛག་སྒང་	Pangzor སྤང་ཟོར་	Pangzor (Upper Phanphaney)
Chhuzagang ཆུ་འཛག་སྒང་	Thongjabi Yueling མཐོང་རྒྱ་སྦིས་_ཡུལ་གླིང་	Yueling
Chhuzagang ཆུ་འཛག་སྒང་	Thongjabi Yueling མཐོང་རྒྱ་སྦིས་_ཡུལ་གླིང་	Yueling (Danabari)
Chhuzagang ཆུ་འཛག་སྒང་	Thongjabi Yueling མཐོང་རྒྱ་སྦིས་_ཡུལ་གླིང་	Yueling (Daragoan)
Chhuzagang ཆུ་འཛག་སྒང་	Thongjabi Yueling མཐོང་རྒྱ་སྦིས་_ཡུལ་གླིང་	Yueling (Lower Phanphaney)
Chhuzagang ཆུ་འཛག་སྒང་	Thongjabi Yueling མཐོང་རྒྱ་སྦིས་_ཡུལ་གླིང་	Zombabi (Daragoan)
Chhuzagang ཆུ་འཛག་སྒང་	Thongjabi Yueling མཐོང་རྒྱ་སྦིས་_ཡུལ་གླིང་	Tongjabi
Chhuzagang ཆུ་འཛག་སྒང་	Thongjabi Yueling མཐོང་རྒྱ་སྦིས་_ཡུལ་གླིང་	Tongjabi (Danabari)
Chhuzagang ཆུ་འཛག་སྒང་	Thongjabi Yueling མཐོང་རྒྱ་སྦིས་_ཡུལ་གླིང་	Tongjabi (Daragoan)
Chhuzagang ཆུ་འཛག་སྒང་	Thongjabi Yueling མཐོང་རྒྱ་སྦིས་_ཡུལ་གླིང་	Tongjabi (Lower Phanphaney)
Chhuzagang ཆུ་འཛག་སྒང་	Thongjabi Yueling མཐོང་རྒྱ་སྦིས་_ཡུལ་གླིང་	Tshojan (Lower Phanphaney)
Chhuzagang ཆུ་འཛག་སྒང་	Nyimaling Shawapong ཉི་མ་གླིང་_ཤ་ཝ་སྤོང་	Chaskhar (Daragoan)
Chhuzagang ཆུ་འཛག་སྒང་	Nyimaling Shawapong ཉི་མ་གླིང་_ཤ་ཝ་སྤོང་	Nyimaling
Chhuzagang ཆུ་འཛག་སྒང་	Nyimaling Shawapong ཉི་མ་གླིང་_ཤ་ཝ་སྤོང་	Nyimaling (Daragoan)
Chhuzagang ཆུ་འཛག་སྒང་	Nyimaling Shawapong ཉི་མ་གླིང་_ཤ་ཝ་སྤོང་	Nyimaling (Lower Phanphaney)
Chhuzagang ཆུ་འཛག་སྒང་	Nyimaling Shawapong ཉི་མ་གླིང་_ཤ་ཝ་སྤོང་	Shawaphoong
Chhuzagang ཆུ་འཛག་སྒང་	Nyimaling Shawapong ཉི་མ་གླིང་_ཤ་ཝ་སྤོང་	Shawaphoong (Daragoan)
Chhuzagang ཆུ་འཛག་སྒང་	Nyimaling Shawapong ཉི་མ་གླིང་_ཤ་ཝ་སྤོང་	Shawaphoong (Lower Phanphaney)
Chhuzagang ཆུ་འཛག་སྒང་	Barthang བར་ཐང་	Barthang
Chhuzagang ཆུ་འཛག་སྒང་	Barthang བར་ཐང་	Barthang (Daragoan)
Chhuzagang ཆུ་འཛག་སྒང་	Barthang བར་ཐང་	Tshojan
Chhuzagang ཆུ་འཛག་སྒང་	Barthang བར་ཐང་	Zambabi
Chhuzagang ཆུ་འཛག་སྒང་	Barthang བར་ཐང་	Zambabi (Danabari)
Chhudzom ཆུ་འཛོམས་	Sherabling ཤེས་རབ་གླིང་	Chunyethang (Baragaray)
Chhudzom ཆུ་འཛོམས་	Sherabling ཤེས་རབ་གླིང་	Norbugang (Khargaon)
Chhudzom ཆུ་འཛོམས་	Sherabling ཤེས་རབ་གླིང་	Mongarling (Mongergaon)
Chhudzom ཆུ་འཛོམས་	Sherabling ཤེས་རབ་གླིང་	Sherabling (Pathibara)
Chhudzom ཆུ་འཛོམས་	Sherabling ཤེས་རབ་གླིང་	Thongjabi (Tarkharkha)
Chhudzom ཆུ་འཛོམས་	Gaalegthang དགའ་ལེགས་ཐང་	Thselithang (Bhimirey)
Chhudzom ཆུ་འཛོམས་	Gaalegthang དགའ་ལེགས་ཐང་	Samtenphu (Daragaon)
Chhudzom ཆུ་འཛོམས་	Gaalegthang དགའ་ལེགས་ཐང་	Chhibigang (Gairigaon)
Chhudzom ཆུ་འཛོམས་	Gaalegthang དགའ་ལེགས་ཐང་	Galegthang (Ghunring)
Chhudzom ཆུ་འཛོམས་	Gaalegthang དགའ་ལེགས་ཐང་	Pelrigang (Rametey)
Chhudzom ཆུ་འཛོམས་	Jangchhubling བྱང་ཆུབ་གླིང་	Chhudzomsa (Dovan)
Chhudzom ཆུ་འཛོམས་	Jangchhubling བྱང་ཆུབ་གླིང་	Jangchhubling (Pankhey)
Chhudzom ཆུ་འཛོམས་	Jangchhubling བྱང་ཆུབ་གླིང་	Mautsangchhu (Maukhola)
Chhudzom ཆུ་འཛོམས་	Jangchhubling བྱང་ཆུབ་གླིང་	Bachhuthang (Bechkhola)
Chhudzom ཆུ་འཛོམས་	Jangchhubling བྱང་ཆུབ་གླིང་	Nyachhu (Machukhola)
Chhudzom ཆུ་འཛོམས་	Jangchhubling བྱང་ཆུབ་གླིང་	Dechenling (Nunpani)
Chhudzom ཆུ་འཛོམས་	Jangchhubling བྱང་ཆུབ་གླིང་	Azhethang (Ranikhop)
Chhudzom ཆུ་འཛོམས་	Dragchhu བྲག་ཆུ་	Rijugang (Fedi)
Chhudzom ཆུ་འཛོམས་	Dragchhu བྲག་ཆུ་	Dragchhu (Tirkhola)
Chhudzom ཆུ་འཛོམས་	Lhayuel ལྷ་གཡུལ་	Lhayuel (Mougaon)
Dekiling བདེ་སྐྱིད་གླིང་	Jigmedling འཇིགས་མེད་གླིང་	Mendelgang (Bichpani)
Dekiling བདེ་སྐྱིད་གླིང་	Jigmedling འཇིགས་མེད་གླིང་	Jigmedling (Chuwabari)
Dekiling བདེ་སྐྱིད་གླིང་	Jigmedling འཇིགས་མེད་གླིང་	Dolongang (Gairegoan)
Dekiling བདེ་སྐྱིད་གླིང་	Jigmedling འཇིགས་མེད་གླིང་	Menchhuthang (Rateygoan)
Dekiling བདེ་སྐྱིད་གླིང་	Jigmedling འཇིགས་མེད་གླིང་	Rateypani (Dekiling)
Dekiling བདེ་སྐྱིད་གླིང་	Nubgang ནུབ་སྒང་	Nubgang (Dolpani)
Dekiling བདེ་སྐྱིད་གླིང་	Dekidling བདེ་སྐྱིད་གླིང་	Darbithang (Sukhatar)
Dekiling བདེ་སྐྱིད་གླིང་	Dekidling བདེ་སྐྱིད་གླིང་	Dekidling (Leopani)
Dekiling བདེ་སྐྱིད་གླིང་	Dekidling བདེ་སྐྱིད་གླིང་	Hamlingphu (Leokhop)
Dekiling བདེ་སྐྱིད་གླིང་	Dekidling བདེ་སྐྱིད་གླིང་	Lungtenbi (Sukhatar)
Dekiling བདེ་སྐྱིད་གླིང་	Dekidling བདེ་སྐྱིད་གླིང་	Dabithang (Sukhatar)
Dekiling བདེ་སྐྱིད་གླིང་	Dekidling བདེ་སྐྱིད་གླིང་	Tashiling (Lampatey)
Dekiling བདེ་སྐྱིད་གླིང་	Gawaithang དགའ་བའི་ཐང་	Gawaithang (Kafleytar)
Dekiling བདེ་སྐྱིད་གླིང་	Gawaithang དགའ་བའི་ཐང་	Norbuthang (Kafleytar)
Dekiling བདེ་སྐྱིད་གླིང་	Gawaithang དགའ་བའི་ཐང་	Yangchenphu (Kafleytar)
Dekiling བདེ་སྐྱིད་གླིང་	Chhoekhorling ཆོས་འཁོར་གླིང་	Chhoekhorling (Toribari)
Gakiling དགའ་སྐྱིད་གླིང་	Maenchhulam སྨན་ཆུ་ལམ་	Balchhangchhu (Belkhola)
Gakiling དགའ་སྐྱིད་གླིང་	Maenchhulam སྨན་ཆུ་ལམ་	Dragphuchhen (Gangatey)
Gakiling དགའ་སྐྱིད་གླིང་	Maenchhulam སྨན་ཆུ་ལམ་	Maenchhulam (Kharpani/Hilley)
Gakiling དགའ་སྐྱིད་གླིང་	Sangkha སང་ཁ་	Jachhu (Muga)
Gakiling དགའ་སྐྱིད་གླིང་	Sangkha སང་ཁ་	Sangkha (Rateypani/Hilley)
Gakiling དགའ་སྐྱིད་གླིང་	Rilangthang རི་གླང་ཐང་	Ralingthang (Noonpani)
Gakiling དགའ་སྐྱིད་གླིང་	Getemkha དགེ་སྟེམ་ཁ་	Chursini (Kagatey)
Gakiling དགའ་སྐྱིད་གླིང་	Getemkha དགེ་སྟེམ་ཁ་	Getemkha (Laring)
Gakiling དགའ་སྐྱིད་གླིང་	Gakidling དགའ་སྐྱིད་གླིང་	Bunakha (Bitsy)
Gakiling དགའ་སྐྱིད་གླིང་	Gakidling དགའ་སྐྱིད་གླིང་	Gakidling (Hilley)
Gakiling དགའ་སྐྱིད་གླིང་	Gakidling དགའ་སྐྱིད་གླིང་	Omchhunang (Kwapani)
Gelephu དགེ་ལེགས་ཕུ་	Pelrithang Khatoed དཔལ་རི་ཐང་ཁ་སྟོད་	Pelrithang (Lodrai)
Gelephu དགེ་ལེགས་ཕུ་	Pelrithang Khatoed དཔལ་རི་ཐང་ཁ་སྟོད་	Pelrithang (Somitar)
Gelephu དགེ་ལེགས་ཕུ་	Pelrithang Khamaed དཔལ་རི་ཐང་ཁ་སྨད་	Pelrithang
Gelephu དགེ་ལེགས་ཕུ་	Pelrithang Khamaed དཔལ་རི་ཐང་ཁ་སྨད་	Pelrithang (Mainatar)
Gelephu དགེ་ལེགས་ཕུ་	Dzamlingthang འཛམ་གླིང་ཐང་	Dzamlingthang (Mainator)
Gelephu དགེ་ལེགས་ཕུ་	Pemathang པདྨ་ཐང་	Pemathang (Somitar)
Gelephu དགེ་ལེགས་ཕུ་	Lekidthang ལས་སྐྱིད་ཐང་	Lekidthang (Lakitar)
Jigmechholing འཇིགས་མེད་ཆོས་གླིང་	Gongtsekha གོང་རྩེ་ཁ་	Tagjogang (Babjungay)
Jigmechholing འཇིགས་མེད་ཆོས་གླིང་	Gongtsekha གོང་རྩེ་ཁ་	Doringphu (Dungay)
Jigmechholing འཇིགས་མེད་ཆོས་གླིང་	Gongtsekha གོང་རྩེ་ཁ་	Hokaling (Gairigaon)
Jigmechholing འཇིགས་མེད་ཆོས་གླིང་	Gongtsekha གོང་རྩེ་ཁ་	Gongtsekha (Gongdara)
Jigmechholing འཇིགས་མེད་ཆོས་གླིང་	Gongtsekha གོང་རྩེ་ཁ་	Moenchhukga (Mongergaon)
Jigmechholing འཇིགས་མེད་ཆོས་གླིང་	Gongduegang དགོངས་འདུས་སྒང་	Serbugang (Ashiney)
Jigmechholing འཇིགས་མེད་ཆོས་གླིང་	Gongduegang དགོངས་འདུས་སྒང་	Mendrelgang (Bhirgaon)
Jigmechholing འཇིགས་མེད་ཆོས་གླིང་	Gongduegang དགོངས་འདུས་སྒང་	Gongduegang (Gong Gaon)
Jigmechholing འཇིགས་མེད་ཆོས་གླིང་	Gongduegang དགོངས་འདུས་སྒང་	Gakidling (Kholatar)
Jigmechholing འཇིགས་མེད་ཆོས་གླིང་	Gongduegang དགོངས་འདུས་སྒང་	Riti (Reti)
Jigmechholing འཇིགས་མེད་ཆོས་གླིང་	Gongduegang དགོངས་འདུས་སྒང་	Galegchhu (Galeychu)
Jigmechholing འཇིགས་མེད་ཆོས་གླིང་	Gongduegang དགོངས་འདུས་སྒང་	Shingkharthang (Samkhara)
Jigmechholing འཇིགས་མེད་ཆོས་གླིང་	Chhoetenkhar ཆོས་རྟེན་མཁར་	Pemagang (Pakhey)
Jigmechholing འཇིགས་མེད་ཆོས་གླིང་	Chhoetenkhar ཆོས་རྟེན་མཁར་	Chhoetenkhar (Sukumbasi)
Jigmechholing འཇིགས་མེད་ཆོས་གླིང་	Chhoetenkhar ཆོས་རྟེན་མཁར་	Tormaphoog (Tormay)
Jigmechholing འཇིགས་མེད་ཆོས་གླིང་	Khamaed ཁ་སྨད་	Tashigatshel (Chakpai)
Jigmechholing འཇིགས་མེད་ཆོས་གླིང་	Khamaed ཁ་སྨད་	Chungsing
Jigmechholing འཇིགས་མེད་ཆོས་གླིང་	Khamaed ཁ་སྨད་	Bartsham Ka (Bichgaon A)
Jigmechholing འཇིགས་མེད་ཆོས་གླིང་	Khamaed ཁ་སྨད་	Bartsham Kha (Bichgaon B)
Jigmechholing འཇིགས་མེད་ཆོས་གླིང་	Khamaed ཁ་སྨད་	Khamaed (Daragaon)
Jigmechholing འཇིགས་མེད་ཆོས་གླིང་	Khamaed ཁ་སྨད་	Khamaed
Jigmechholing འཇིགས་མེད་ཆོས་གླིང་	Khamaed ཁ་སྨད་	Khamo
Jigmechholing འཇིགས་མེད་ཆོས་གླིང་	Khatoed ཁ་སྟོད་	Khatoed
Jigmechholing འཇིགས་མེད་ཆོས་གླིང་	Khatoed ཁ་སྟོད་	Jungchhurgang (Saudalay)
Jigmechholing འཇིགས་མེད་ཆོས་གླིང་	Khatoed ཁ་སྟོད་	Khatoed (Sirangaon)
Jigmechholing འཇིགས་མེད་ཆོས་གླིང་	Khatoed ཁ་སྟོད་	Silsagang (Casey)
Jigmechholing འཇིགས་མེད་ཆོས་གླིང་	Khatoed ཁ་སྟོད་	Tshachhu (Tatopani)
Jigmechholing འཇིགས་མེད་ཆོས་གླིང་	Samkhar བསམ་ཁར་	Lungselgang
Jigmechholing འཇིགས་མེད་ཆོས་གླིང་	Samkhar བསམ་ཁར་	Pachhakha (Beteni)
Jigmechholing འཇིགས་མེད་ཆོས་གླིང་	Samkhar བསམ་ཁར་	Samkhara
Samtenling བསམ་གཏན་གླིང་	Samteling བསམ་གྷཏན་གླིང་	Samtenling (Bhur)
Samtenling བསམ་གཏན་གླིང་	Khenpagang མཁན་པ་སྒང་	Khenpagang (Dungmindra)
Samtenling བསམ་གཏན་གླིང་	Khenpagang མཁན་པ་སྒང་	Dungkharling
Samtenling བསམ་གཏན་གླིང་	Samthenthang བསམ་གཏན་ཐང་	Samtenthang (Juprey)
Samtenling བསམ་གཏན་གླིང་	Samthenthang བསམ་གཏན་ཐང་	Samtenthang (Jupreydara)
Samtenling བསམ་གཏན་གླིང་	Dechhenpelri བདེ་ཆེན་དཔལ་རི་	Dechhenpelri (Jaruwa)
Samtenling བསམ་གཏན་གླིང་	Chhoekhorling Dechhenpelri ཆོས་འཁོར་གླིང་_བདེ་ཆེན་དཔལ་རི་	Dechenpelri (Jaruwa)
Samtenling བསམ་གཏན་གླིང་	Chhoekhorling Dechhenpelri ཆོས་འཁོར་གླིང་_བདེ་ཆེན་དཔལ་རི་	Chhoekhorling (Majuwa)
Senggey སེ་ངྒེ་	Rishong རི་ཤོང་	Rishong (Sistykhopan)
Senggey སེ་ངྒེ་	Rishong རི་ཤོང་	Tashitsel (Labarbotay)
Senggey སེ་ངྒེ་	Nyenyul སྙན་ཡུལ་	Nenyul (Sisty)
Senggey སེ་ངྒེ་	Labtsakha ལབ་རྩ་ཁ་	Yuejug (Chotatsirang)
Senggey སེ་ངྒེ་	Labtsakha ལབ་རྩ་ཁ་	Labtsakha
Senggey སེ་ངྒེ་	Yarpheling ཡར་འཕེལ་གླིང་	Sahariphu (Balatung)
Senggey སེ་ངྒེ་	Yarpheling ཡར་འཕེལ་གླིང་	Peljorling (Kopchey)
Senggey སེ་ངྒེ་	Yarpheling ཡར་འཕེལ་གླིང་	Yarpheling (Toemba)
Senggey སེ་ངྒེ་	Sangyethang སངས་རྒྱས་ཐང་	Wangchuling (Phibsoo)
Senggey སེ་ངྒེ་	Sangyethang སངས་རྒྱས་ཐང་	Chiwaling (Pingkhuwa)
Senggey སེ་ངྒེ་	Sangyethang སངས་རྒྱས་ཐང་	Singhi
Sherzhong གསེར་གཞོང་	Sherzhong གསེར་གཞོང་	Sherzhong
Sherzhong གསེར་གཞོང་	Barshong བར་གཤོང་	Barshong (Thaewar)
Sherzhong གསེར་གཞོང་	Pemayoedling པདྨ་འོད་གླིང་	Kapung (Somitar)
Sherzhong གསེར་གཞོང་	Pemayoedling པདྨ་འོད་གླིང་	Pangkhar (Somitar)
Sherzhong གསེར་གཞོང་	Pemayoedling པདྨ་འོད་གླིང་	Pemayoedling
Sherzhong གསེར་གཞོང་	Norbuling ནོར་བུ་གླིང་	Norbuling
Sherzhong གསེར་གཞོང་	Tashiphoog བཀྲིས་ཕུག་	Tashiphoog
Shompangkha ཤོམ་སྤང་ཁ་	Shompangkha ཤོམ་སྤང་ཁ་	Shompangkha (Sarpangtar)
Shompangkha ཤོམ་སྤང་ཁ་	Shompangkha ཤོམ་སྤང་ཁ་	Gadanchholing (Sarpangbazar)
Shompangkha ཤོམ་སྤང་ཁ་	Dargyethang དར་རྒྱས་ཐང་	Dargyethang (Patabari)
Shompangkha ཤོམ་སྤང་ཁ་	Dargyethang དར་རྒྱས་ཐང་	Norbugang (Akhow)
Shompangkha ཤོམ་སྤང་ཁ་	Koenchhogling དཀོན་མཆོག་གླིང་	Koenchhogling (Kharpanitar)
Shompangkha ཤོམ་སྤང་ཁ་	Koenchhogling དཀོན་མཆོག་གླིང་	Thongjazor (Parkheygoan)
Shompangkha ཤོམ་སྤང་ཁ་	Gomchola སྒོམ་ལྕོ་ལ་	Gomchola Ka (Chaar)
Shompangkha ཤོམ་སྤང་ཁ་	Gomchola སྒོམ་ལྕོ་ལ་	Gomchola Kha (Kharey Pakhey)
Shompangkha ཤོམ་སྤང་ཁ་	Risoomgang རི་གསུམ་སྒང་	Risoomgang (Tinjurey)
Tareythang རྟ་རས་ཐང་	Tashichhoeling བཀྲིས་ཆོས་གླིང་	Tashichhoeling (Krasheschholing)
Tareythang རྟ་རས་ཐང་	Yoedzergang འོད་ཟེར་སྒང་	Yoed Zergang (Rangadara)
Tareythang རྟ་རས་ཐང་	Pemahhoeling པདྨ་ཆོས་གླིང་	Pemachholing (Dragaon)
Tareythang རྟ་རས་ཐང་	Pemahhoeling པདྨ་ཆོས་གླིང་	Garkhola
Tareythang རྟ་རས་ཐང་	Pemahhoeling པདྨ་ཆོས་གླིང་	Khamartari
Tareythang རྟ་རས་ཐང་	Pemahhoeling པདྨ་ཆོས་གླིང་	Lamitar
Tareythang རྟ་རས་ཐང་	Pemahhoeling པདྨ་ཆོས་གླིང་	Singhi Dap
Tareythang རྟ་རས་ཐང་	Pemahhoeling པདྨ་ཆོས་གླིང་	Singhi Dara
Tareythang རྟ་རས་ཐང་	Dorjitse རྡོ་རྗེ་རྩེ་	Dorjitse (Chargery)
Tareythang རྟ་རས་ཐང་	Woongchhiloo འུང་ཆི་ལུ་	Woongchhilu (Limbutar)
Tareythang རྟ་རས་ཐང་	Woongchhiloo འུང་ཆི་ལུ་	Tashichholing
Umling ཨུམ་གླིང་	Tashithang བཀྲིས་ཐང་	Tashithang
Umling ཨུམ་གླིང་	Tashithang བཀྲིས་ཐང་	Thongjazor
Umling ཨུམ་གླིང་	Tashithang བཀྲིས་ཐང་	Chubarthang (Chesopani)
Umling ཨུམ་གླིང་	Daangling དང་གླིང་	Daangling
Umling ཨུམ་གླིང་	Daangling དང་གླིང་	Daangling (Dhoray)
Umling ཨུམ་གླིང་	Daangling དང་གླིང་	Daangling (Katesey)
Umling ཨུམ་གླིང་	Doongmin དུང་མིན་	Dungmin
Umling ཨུམ་གླིང་	Doongmin དུང་མིན་	Dungmin (Baraytar)
Umling ཨུམ་གླིང་	Doongmin དུང་མིན་	Dungmin (Bawanitar)
Umling ཨུམ་གླིང་	Doongmin དུང་མིན་	Dungmin (Bichpany)
Umling ཨུམ་གླིང་	Doongmin དུང་མིན་	Dungmin (Bistadara)
Umling ཨུམ་གླིང་	Doongmin དུང་མིན་	Dungmin (Gobritar)
Umling ཨུམ་གླིང་	Doongmin དུང་མིན་	Dungmin (Gurungtar)
Umling ཨུམ་གླིང་	Doongmin དུང་མིན་	Dungmin (Salbandi)
Umling ཨུམ་གླིང་	Rijoog རི་འཇུག་	Lingar
Umling ཨུམ་གླིང་	Rijoog རི་འཇུག་	Lingar (Bistadara)
Umling ཨུམ་གླིང་	Rijoog རི་འཇུག་	Rijoog
Umling ཨུམ་གླིང་	Rijoog རི་འཇུག་	Rijoog
Umling ཨུམ་གླིང་	Rijoog རི་འཇུག་	Rijoog (Largkhar)
Umling ཨུམ་གླིང་	Rijoog རི་འཇུག་	Rijoog (Tamkuley)
Umling ཨུམ་གླིང་	Gaden དགའ་ལྡན་	Gaden
Umling ཨུམ་གླིང་	Gaden དགའ་ལྡན་	Gaden (Proper Lalai)
Umling ཨུམ་གླིང་	Gaden དགའ་ལྡན་	Gaden (School Dara)
Umling ཨུམ་གླིང་	Gaden དགའ་ལྡན་	Gaden (Upper Lalai)
Umling ཨུམ་གླིང་	Gaden དགའ་ལྡན་	Gaden (Upper Lalaidhap)

=== Thimphu District ===
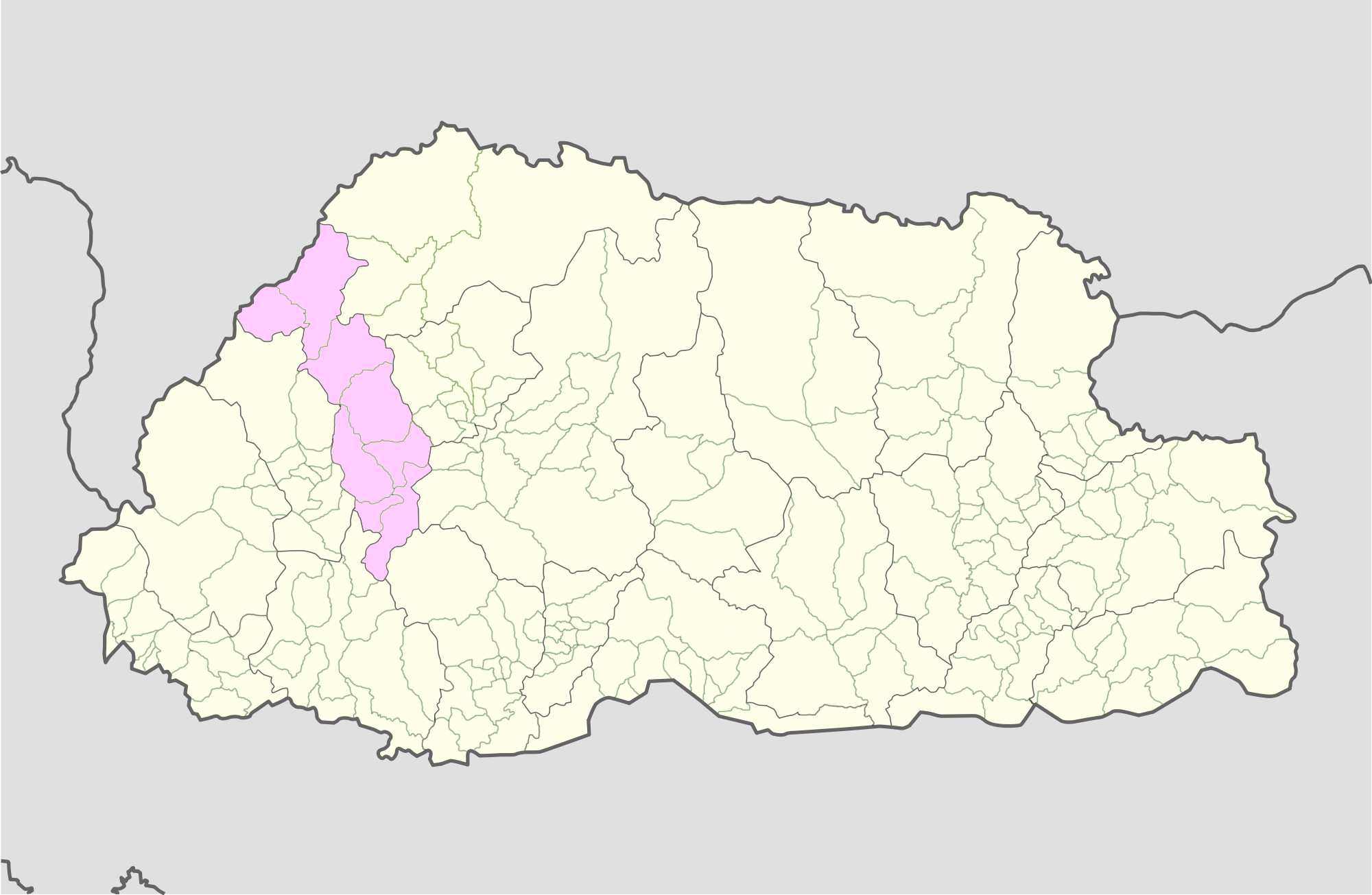
Thimphu District

Gewog	Chiwog	Village
Chang ལྕང་	Lhoongtsho Tashigang ལྷུང་འཚོ་_བཀྲིས་སྒང་	Lhoongtsho
Chang ལྕང་	Yoedselpang འོད་གསལ་སྤང་	Yoedselpang
Chang ལྕང་	Yoedselpang འོད་གསལ་སྤང་	Babi Chorten
Chang ལྕང་	Changyokha Debsid ལྕང་ཡོ་ཁ་_སྡེབ་སྲིད་	Debsid
Chang ལྕང་	Changyokha Debsid ལྕང་ཡོ་ཁ་_སྡེབ་སྲིད་	Ngachuphakha
Chang ལྕང་	Changyokha Debsid ལྕང་ཡོ་ཁ་_སྡེབ་སྲིད་	Sarbethang
Chang ལྕང་	Ramtogtog Tsangrina རམ་རྟོག་རྟོག_གཙང་རི་ན་	Jumo
Chang ལྕང་	Ramtogtog Tsangrina རམ་རྟོག་རྟོག_གཙང་རི་ན་	Rama
Chang ལྕང་	Gangchhe Talakha སྒང་ཆེ་_རྟ་ལ་ཁ་	Gangchhe
Chang ལྕང་	Gangchhe Talakha སྒང་ཆེ་_རྟ་ལ་ཁ་	Nezeylhakhang
Darkala དར་དཀར་ལ་	Chamgang Maed ལྕམ་སྒང་སྨད་	Chamgang
Darkala དར་དཀར་ལ་	Chamgang Toed ལྕམ་སྒང་སྟོད་	Chamgang Toed
Darkala དར་དཀར་ལ་	Doongdrog འདུང་འབྲོག་	Doongdrog
Darkala དར་དཀར་ལ་	Wangdrog ཝང་འབྲོག་	Wangdrog
Darkala དར་དཀར་ལ་	Gyaltala རྒྱལ་བལྟ་ལ་	Gyaltala
Genye དགེ་བསྙེན་	Wangbama ཝང་བ་མ་	Wangbama
Genye དགེ་བསྙེན་	Chizhi སྤྱི་གཞི་	Chizhi Goenpa
Genye དགེ་བསྙེན་	Zanglegkha ཟངས་ལེགས་ཁ་	Zanglegkha
Genye དགེ་བསྙེན་	Genyenkha དགེ་བསྙེན་ཁ་	Ge-Nyenkha
Genye དགེ་བསྙེན་	Tshochhenkha Zamtog མཚོ་ཆེན་ཁ་_ཟམ་ཏོག་	Tsho-Chhenkha
Kawang ཀ་ཝང་	Boegarna Dodennang བོད་སྒར་ན་_རྡོ་གདན་ནང་	Boegarna
Kawang ཀ་ཝང་	Boegarna Dodennang བོད་སྒར་ན་_རྡོ་གདན་ནང་	Dodennang
Kawang ཀ་ཝང་	Boegarna Dodennang བོད་སྒར་ན་_རྡོ་གདན་ནང་	Janazampa
Kawang ཀ་ཝང་	Kuzhugchen སྐུ་བཞུགས་ཅན་	Kuzhugchen
Kawang ཀ་ཝང་	Kuzhugchen སྐུ་བཞུགས་ཅན་	Wangkawog
Kawang ཀ་ཝང་	Chhandagang Chhoekortse Phajoding ཕྱག་མདའ་སྒང་_ཆོས་འཁོར་ཙེ_ཕ་ཇོ་སྡིང་	Deling Goenpa
Kawang ཀ་ཝང་	Chhandagang Chhoekortse Phajoding ཕྱག་མདའ་སྒང་_ཆོས་འཁོར་ཙེ_ཕ་ཇོ་སྡིང་	Tashiding
Kawang ཀ་ཝང་	Chhandagang Chhoekortse Phajoding ཕྱག་མདའ་སྒང་_ཆོས་འཁོར་ཙེ_ཕ་ཇོ་སྡིང་	Dechenphu
Kawang ཀ་ཝང་	Chhandagang Chhoekortse Phajoding ཕྱག་མདའ་སྒང་_ཆོས་འཁོར་ཙེ_ཕ་ཇོ་སྡིང་	Chhandragang
Kawang ཀ་ཝང་	Chhagminang Chhoekhor ཕྱག་མི་ནང་_ཆོས་འཁོར་	Chhagminang
Kawang ཀ་ཝང་	Chhagminang Chhoekhor ཕྱག་མི་ནང་_ཆོས་འཁོར་	Chhoekhor
Kawang ཀ་ཝང་	Dazhi Zhoshuel མདའ་གཞི་_ཞོ་ཤུལ་	Dazhi
Kawang ཀ་ཝང་	Dazhi Zhoshuel མདའ་གཞི་_ཞོ་ཤུལ་	Kabisa
Kawang ཀ་ཝང་	Dazhi Zhoshuel མདའ་གཞི་_ཞོ་ཤུལ་	Zhoshuel
Lingzhi གླིང་གཞི་	Chhuzarkha ཆུ་ཟར་ཁ་	Chhuzarkha
Lingzhi གླིང་གཞི་	Khangkidyuel ཁང་སྐྱིད་ཡུལ་	Khangkid Yuel
Lingzhi གླིང་གཞི་	Gangyuel སྒང་ཡུལ་	Gang Yuel
Lingzhi གླིང་གཞི་	Shayuel ཤ་ཡུལ་	Sha Yuel
Lingzhi གླིང་གཞི་	Chagphu ལྕགས་ཕུ་	Chagphu
Mewang སྨད་ཝང་	Tshaloongna ཚ་ལུང་ན་	Jadingkha
Mewang སྨད་ཝང་	Tshaloongna ཚ་ལུང་ན་	Tshaloongna
Mewang སྨད་ཝང་	Jiminang སྦྱིས་མི་ནང་	Bemegasa
Mewang སྨད་ཝང་	Jiminang སྦྱིས་མི་ནང་	Doklaisa
Mewang སྨད་ཝང་	Jiminang སྦྱིས་མི་ནང་	Dolepchen
Mewang སྨད་ཝང་	Jiminang སྦྱིས་མི་ནང་	Chimithangka
Mewang སྨད་ཝང་	Jiminang སྦྱིས་མི་ནང་	Gida
Mewang སྨད་ཝང་	Jiminang སྦྱིས་མི་ནང་	Goenwog
Mewang སྨད་ཝང་	Jiminang སྦྱིས་མི་ནང་	Jampel
Mewang སྨད་ཝང་	Jiminang སྦྱིས་མི་ནང་	Jiminang
Mewang སྨད་ཝང་	Jiminang སྦྱིས་མི་ནང་	Kepaithang
Mewang སྨད་ཝང་	Jiminang སྦྱིས་མི་ནང་	Lamwog
Mewang སྨད་ཝང་	Jiminang སྦྱིས་མི་ནང་	Lingzhipharka
Mewang སྨད་ཝང་	Jiminang སྦྱིས་མི་ནང་	Puleona
Mewang སྨད་ཝང་	Jiminang སྦྱིས་མི་ནང་	Silidraphu
Mewang སྨད་ཝང་	Jiminang སྦྱིས་མི་ནང་	Siluna
Mewang སྨད་ཝང་	Danglo Namsaeling དངས་ལོ_རྣམ་སྲས་གླིང་	Danglo
Mewang སྨད་ཝང་	Danglo Namsaeling དངས་ལོ_རྣམ་སྲས་གླིང་	Chudingkha
Mewang སྨད་ཝང་	Danglo Namsaeling དངས་ལོ_རྣམ་སྲས་གླིང་	Dramesa
Mewang སྨད་ཝང་	Danglo Namsaeling དངས་ལོ_རྣམ་སྲས་གླིང་	Nyenzerkha
Mewang སྨད་ཝང་	Danglo Namsaeling དངས་ལོ_རྣམ་སྲས་གླིང་	Simu
Mewang སྨད་ཝང་	Danglo Namsaeling དངས་ལོ_རྣམ་སྲས་གླིང་	Walunang
Mewang སྨད་ཝང་	Khasdrapchu ཁ་ས་ཁྲབ་ཅུ་	Zhingsagang
Mewang སྨད་ཝང་	Khasdrapchu ཁ་ས་ཁྲབ་ཅུ་	Jamdo
Mewang སྨད་ཝང་	Khasdrapchu ཁ་ས་ཁྲབ་ཅུ་	Jamdo Goma
Mewang སྨད་ཝང་	Khasdrapchu ཁ་ས་ཁྲབ་ཅུ་	Jamdo Woma
Mewang སྨད་ཝང་	Khasdrapchu ཁ་ས་ཁྲབ་ཅུ་	Khasadrapchu
Mewang སྨད་ཝང་	Khasdrapchu ཁ་ས་ཁྲབ་ཅུ་	Khasakha
Mewang སྨད་ཝང་	Khasdrapchu ཁ་ས་ཁྲབ་ཅུ་	Langdro
Mewang སྨད་ཝང་	Khasdrapchu ཁ་ས་ཁྲབ་ཅུ་	Samakha
Mewang སྨད་ཝང་	Khasdrapchu ཁ་ས་ཁྲབ་ཅུ་	Sigay
Mewang སྨད་ཝང་	Khasdrapchu ཁ་ས་ཁྲབ་ཅུ་	Tshaphu
Mewang སྨད་ཝང་	Sisinang སི་སི་ནང་	Dalukha
Mewang སྨད་ཝང་	Sisinang སི་སི་ནང་	Dongkarla
Mewang སྨད་ཝང་	Sisinang སི་སི་ནང་	Kharibji
Mewang སྨད་ཝང་	Sisinang སི་སི་ནང་	Kharphu
Mewang སྨད་ཝང་	Sisinang སི་སི་ནང་	Patsekha
Mewang སྨད་ཝང་	Sisinang སི་སི་ནང་	Pungzhi
Mewang སྨད་ཝང་	Sisinang སི་སི་ནང་	Sengyelna/Karphu
Mewang སྨད་ཝང་	Sisinang སི་སི་ནང་	Selaykha
Mewang སྨད་ཝང་	Sisinang སི་སི་ནང་	Sisinang
Naro ན་རོ་	Moentsiphoog སྨོན་རྕི་ཕུག་	Gangbu
Naro ན་རོ་	Moentsiphoog སྨོན་རྕི་ཕུག་	Moentshiphoog
Naro ན་རོ་	Moentsiphoog སྨོན་རྕི་ཕུག་	Zigu
Naro ན་རོ་	Barshong Nango བར་ཤོང_ནང་སྒོ་	Barshong
Naro ན་རོ་	Zhomthang ཞོམ་ཐང་	Gunglona
Naro ན་རོ་	Zhomthang ཞོམ་ཐང་	Goedshog
Naro ན་རོ་	Zhomthang ཞོམ་ཐང་	Sipchu
Naro ན་རོ་	Zhomthang ཞོམ་ཐང་	Walithang
Naro ན་རོ་	Zhomthang ཞོམ་ཐང་	Waza
Naro ན་རོ་	Zhomthang ཞོམ་ཐང་	Zhomthang
Naro ན་རོ་	Pagoed པ་རྒོད་	Jagoethang
Naro ན་རོ་	Pagoed པ་རྒོད་	Chungdulo
Naro ན་རོ་	Pagoed པ་རྒོད་	Naro
Naro ན་རོ་	Pagoed པ་རྒོད་	Khasho
Naro ན་རོ་	Pagoed པ་རྒོད་	Pagoed
Naro ན་རོ་	Tagsidthang སྟག་སྲིད་ཐང་	Tagsidthang
Naro ན་རོ་	Tagsidthang སྟག་སྲིད་ཐང་	Lhayulhaetoed
Soe སྲོས་	Jangothang བྱང་སྒོ་ཐང་	Gadraten
Soe སྲོས་	Jangothang བྱང་སྒོ་ཐང་	Jangothang
Soe སྲོས་	Damgochong གདམ་སྒོ་སྐྱོང་	Damgochong
Soe སྲོས་	Dotaapaithang རྡོ་སྟབས་པའི་ཐང་	Dotaapaithang
Soe སྲོས་	Dotaapaithang རྡོ་སྟབས་པའི་ཐང་	Toepgoethang
Soe སྲོས་	Tozotoen རྟོ་བཟོ་སྟོན་	Dozotoen
Soe སྲོས་	Jomphu འཇོམ་ཕུ་	Jomphu
Soe སྲོས་	Jomphu འཇོམ་ཕུ་	Changmatasa

=== Trashigang District ===
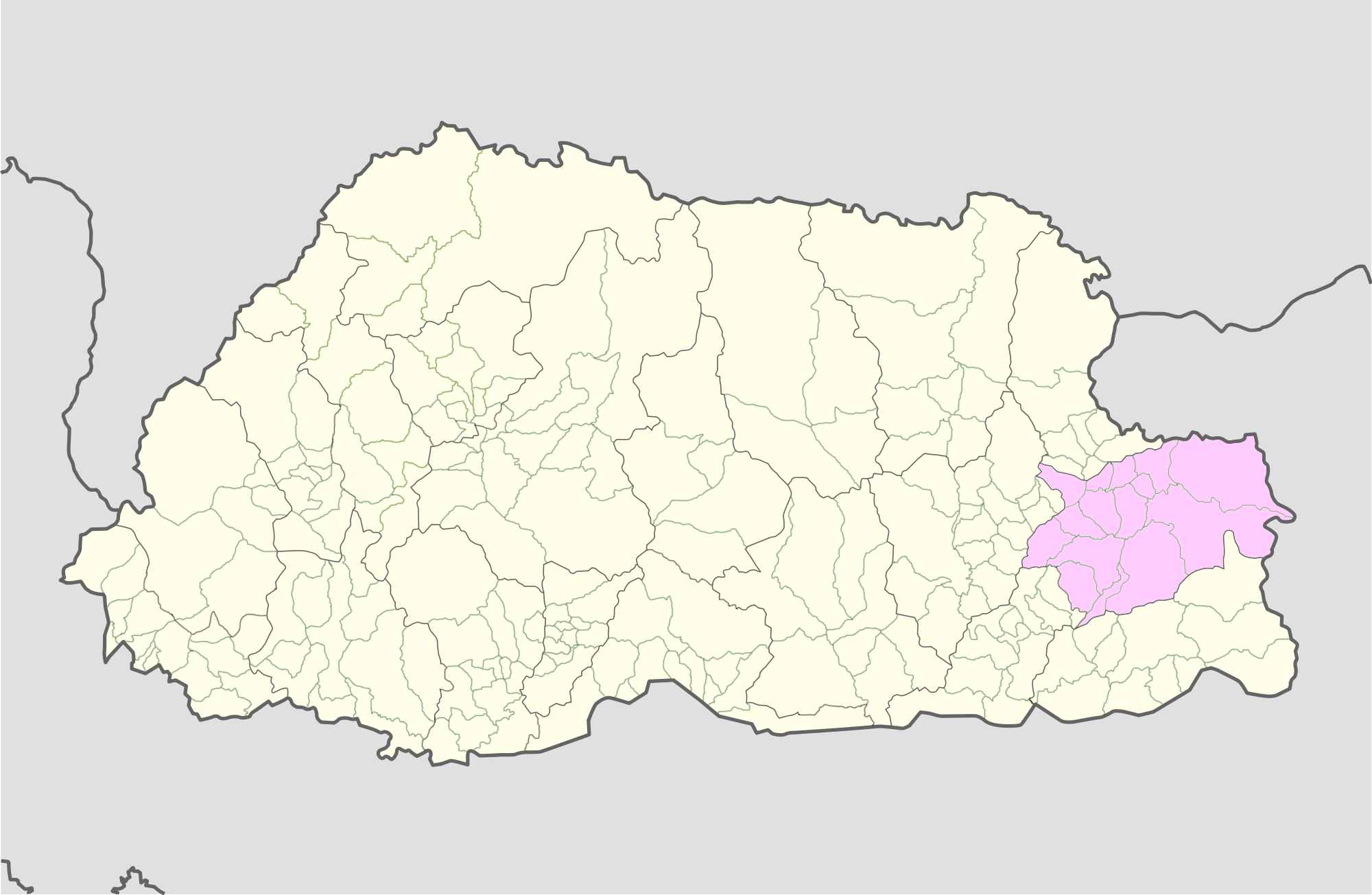
Trashigang District

Gewog	Chiwog	Village
Bartsham བར་མཚམས་	Trashang བཀྲ་ཤང་	Thangchey
Bartsham བར་མཚམས་	Trashang བཀྲ་ཤང་	Maentshang
Bartsham བར་མཚམས་	Trashang བཀྲ་ཤང་	Trashang
Bartsham བར་མཚམས་	Bainangkhar Nangkhar བའི་ནང་མཁར་_སྣངས་མཁར་	Bargoen
Bartsham བར་མཚམས་	Bainangkhar Nangkhar བའི་ནང་མཁར་_སྣངས་མཁར་	Bainangkhar
Bartsham བར་མཚམས་	Bainangkhar Nangkhar བའི་ནང་མཁར་_སྣངས་མཁར་	Bumling
Bartsham བར་མཚམས་	Bainangkhar Nangkhar བའི་ནང་མཁར་_སྣངས་མཁར་	Chaod Lhakang wog
Bartsham བར་མཚམས་	Bainangkhar Nangkhar བའི་ནང་མཁར་_སྣངས་མཁར་	Majadoong
Bartsham བར་མཚམས་	Bainangkhar Nangkhar བའི་ནང་མཁར་_སྣངས་མཁར་	Nagtshang
Bartsham བར་མཚམས་	Bainangkhar Nangkhar བའི་ནང་མཁར་_སྣངས་མཁར་	Pangthang
Bartsham བར་མཚམས་	Bainangkhar Nangkhar བའི་ནང་མཁར་_སྣངས་མཁར་	Tashi Teng
Bartsham བར་མཚམས་	Bainangkhar Nangkhar བའི་ནང་མཁར་_སྣངས་མཁར་	Zoor
Bartsham བར་མཚམས་	Bainangkhar Nangkhar བའི་ནང་མཁར་_སྣངས་མཁར་	Soortshong
Bartsham བར་མཚམས་	Jamoong Kumoong ཇ་མུང་_སྐུ་མུང་	Jamoong
Bartsham བར་མཚམས་	Jamoong Kumoong ཇ་མུང་_སྐུ་མུང་	Kedpoong
Bartsham བར་མཚམས་	Jamoong Kumoong ཇ་མུང་_སྐུ་མུང་	Kumoong
Bartsham བར་མཚམས་	Jamoong Kumoong ཇ་མུང་_སྐུ་མུང་	Rophoong
Bartsham བར་མཚམས་	Jamoong Kumoong ཇ་མུང་_སྐུ་མུང་	Resengma
Bartsham བར་མཚམས་	Jamoong Kumoong ཇ་མུང་_སྐུ་མུང་	Reygang
Bartsham བར་མཚམས་	Jamoong Kumoong ཇ་མུང་_སྐུ་མུང་	Yangkhar
Bartsham བར་མཚམས་	Jamoong Kumoong ཇ་མུང་_སྐུ་མུང་	Pam
Bartsham བར་མཚམས་	Jamoong Kumoong ཇ་མུང་_སྐུ་མུང་	Zhingom
Bartsham བར་མཚམས་	Dzongthong Menchhari རྫོང་མཐོང་_མེན་ཆ་རི་	Sershing
Bartsham བར་མཚམས་	Dzongthong Menchhari རྫོང་མཐོང་_མེན་ཆ་རི་	Dzong Goen
Bartsham བར་མཚམས་	Dzongthong Menchhari རྫོང་མཐོང་_མེན་ཆ་རི་	Dzong Thong
Bartsham བར་མཚམས་	Dzongthong Menchhari རྫོང་མཐོང་_མེན་ཆ་རི་	Ngaloong
Bartsham བར་མཚམས་	Moogtangkhar མུག་སྟངས་མཁར་	Moogkhar
Bartsham བར་མཚམས་	Moogtangkhar མུག་སྟངས་མཁར་	Ngaloong Gang
Bidung སྦིས་གདུང་	Khairi Saling ཁའི་རི་_ས་གླིང་	Gaygoen
Bidung སྦིས་གདུང་	Khairi Saling ཁའི་རི་_ས་གླིང་	Khairi
Bidung སྦིས་གདུང་	Khairi Saling ཁའི་རི་_ས་གླིང་	Dodrom
Bidung སྦིས་གདུང་	Khairi Saling ཁའི་རི་_ས་གླིང་	Daling
Bidung སྦིས་གདུང་	Lemphang ལེམ་ཕང་	Bargoen (Bidung)
Bidung སྦིས་གདུང་	Lemphang ལེམ་ཕང་	Takseri
Bidung སྦིས་གདུང་	Lemphang ལེམ་ཕང་	Limphang
Bidung སྦིས་གདུང་	Tsigtoom ཙིག་སྟུང་	Tsigtoom
Bidung སྦིས་གདུང་	Tsigtoom ཙིག་སྟུང་	Jaloong
Bidung སྦིས་གདུང་	Tsekhar ཚེ་མཁར་	Tsekhar
Bidung སྦིས་གདུང་	Tsekhar ཚེ་མཁར་	Perthong
Bidung སྦིས་གདུང་	Tsekhar ཚེ་མཁར་	Dori (Bidung)
Bidung སྦིས་གདུང་	Kakaniwog ཀ་ཀ་ནི་འོག་	Kakaniwog
Bidung སྦིས་གདུང་	Kakaniwog ཀ་ཀ་ནི་འོག་	Retsang Peg
Kanglung བཀང་ལུང་	Pangthang Ritsangdoong སྤང་ཐང་_རི་གཙང་གདུང་	Pangthang
Kanglung བཀང་ལུང་	Pangthang Ritsangdoong སྤང་ཐང་_རི་གཙང་གདུང་	Ritsangdoong
Kanglung བཀང་ལུང་	Maanthong སྨན་འཐོང་	Maanthong
Kanglung བཀང་ལུང་	Mertsham Thragom མེར་མཚམས་_ཁྲ་སྒོམ་	Mertsham
Kanglung བཀང་ལུང་	Mertsham Thragom མེར་མཚམས་_ཁྲ་སྒོམ་	Thargom
Kanglung བཀང་ལུང་	Yonphoogla ཡོན་ཕུག་ལ་	Yonphoogla
Kanglung བཀང་ལུང་	Yonphoogla ཡོན་ཕུག་ལ་	Yonphoogpam
Kanglung བཀང་ལུང་	Rongthoong Shingchen རོང་ཐུང་_ཤིང་ཅན་	Rongthoong
Kangpar རྐང་པར་	Kangpar Lamyong རྐང་པར་_ལམ་ཡོངས་	Doyam Chema
Kangpar རྐང་པར་	Kangpar Lamyong རྐང་པར་_ལམ་ཡོངས་	Dangna
Kangpar རྐང་པར་	Kangpar Lamyong རྐང་པར་_ལམ་ཡོངས་	Gangpar
Kangpar རྐང་པར་	Kangpar Lamyong རྐང་པར་_ལམ་ཡོངས་	Kheri
Kangpar རྐང་པར་	Kangpar Lamyong རྐང་པར་_ལམ་ཡོངས་	Kheshing
Kangpar རྐང་པར་	Kangpar Lamyong རྐང་པར་_ལམ་ཡོངས་	Lamyong
Kangpar རྐང་པར་	Kangpar Lamyong རྐང་པར་_ལམ་ཡོངས་	Neyling
Kangpar རྐང་པར་	Kangpar Lamyong རྐང་པར་_ལམ་ཡོངས་	Chorphoog
Kangpar རྐང་པར་	Kangpar Lamyong རྐང་པར་_ལམ་ཡོངས་	Langnang
Kangpar རྐང་པར་	Kangpar Lamyong རྐང་པར་_ལམ་ཡོངས་	Sarong
Kangpar རྐང་པར་	Passaphoog Peydoong སྤས་ས་ཕུག་_དཔེ་རྡུང་	Madeywa
Kangpar རྐང་པར་	Passaphoog Peydoong སྤས་ས་ཕུག་_དཔེ་རྡུང་	Passaphoog
Kangpar རྐང་པར་	Passaphoog Peydoong སྤས་ས་ཕུག་_དཔེ་རྡུང་	Peydoong
Kangpar རྐང་པར་	Passaphoog Peydoong སྤས་ས་ཕུག་_དཔེ་རྡུང་	Drumshari
Kangpar རྐང་པར་	Passaphoog Peydoong སྤས་ས་ཕུག་_དཔེ་རྡུང་	Ribalingmi
Kangpar རྐང་པར་	Zordoong ཟོར་གདུང་	Zordoong
Kangpar རྐང་པར་	Threlphoog ཐྲལ་ཕུག་	Threlphoog
Kangpar རྐང་པར་	Bedengphoog Merdag སྦེ་སྡེང་ཐུག་_མེར་བདག་	Bedengphoog
Kangpar རྐང་པར་	Bedengphoog Merdag སྦེ་སྡེང་ཐུག་_མེར་བདག་	Merdag
Kangpar རྐང་པར་	Bedengphoog Merdag སྦེ་སྡེང་ཐུག་_མེར་བདག་	Lagoen
Kangpar རྐང་པར་	Bedengphoog Merdag སྦེ་སྡེང་ཐུག་_མེར་བདག་	Yungney
Khaling ཁ་གླིང་	Khaling ཁ་གླིང་	Daksa
Khaling ཁ་གླིང་	Khaling ཁ་གླིང་	Daktsheng
Khaling ཁ་གླིང་	Khaling ཁ་གླིང་	Douzor
Khaling ཁ་གླིང་	Khaling ཁ་གླིང་	Goenpa
Khaling ཁ་གླིང་	Khaling ཁ་གླིང་	Jibechhu
Khaling ཁ་གླིང་	Khaling ཁ་གླིང་	Mongkhorla
Khaling ཁ་གླིང་	Khaling ཁ་གླིང་	Rashuwoong
Khaling ཁ་གླིང་	Khaling ཁ་གླིང་	Thripang Goenpa
Khaling ཁ་གླིང་	Khaling ཁ་གླིང་	Wangachema
Khaling ཁ་གླིང་	Brekha Meringzor བྲེ་ཁ་_མེ་རིང་ཟོར་	Brekha
Khaling ཁ་གླིང་	Brekha Meringzor བྲེ་ཁ་_མེ་རིང་ཟོར་	Dregoen
Khaling ཁ་གླིང་	Brekha Meringzor བྲེ་ཁ་_མེ་རིང་ཟོར་	Meringzor
Khaling ཁ་གླིང་	Bayphoog Togkaphu སྦས་ཕུག་_རྟོགས་ཀ་ཕུ་	Bayphoog (Khaling)
Khaling ཁ་གླིང་	Bayphoog Togkaphu སྦས་ཕུག་_རྟོགས་ཀ་ཕུ་	Bayphoog Shiri
Khaling ཁ་གླིང་	Bayphoog Togkaphu སྦས་ཕུག་_རྟོགས་ཀ་ཕུ་	Doongthopay
Khaling ཁ་གླིང་	Bayphoog Togkaphu སྦས་ཕུག་_རྟོགས་ཀ་ཕུ་	Brekha Doongtshopay
Khaling ཁ་གླིང་	Bayphoog Togkaphu སྦས་ཕུག་_རྟོགས་ཀ་ཕུ་	Thrimkhar
Khaling ཁ་གླིང་	Bayphoog Togkaphu སྦས་ཕུག་_རྟོགས་ཀ་ཕུ་	Tokaphu
Khaling ཁ་གླིང་	Gomchhu Kholdoong སྒོམ་ཆུ་_འཁོལ་གདུང་	Dangre
Khaling ཁ་གླིང་	Gomchhu Kholdoong སྒོམ་ཆུ་_འཁོལ་གདུང་	Dreywoong
Khaling ཁ་གླིང་	Gomchhu Kholdoong སྒོམ་ཆུ་_འཁོལ་གདུང་	Gomchhu
Khaling ཁ་གླིང་	Gomchhu Kholdoong སྒོམ་ཆུ་_འཁོལ་གདུང་	Khochiphaye
Khaling ཁ་གླིང་	Gomchhu Kholdoong སྒོམ་ཆུ་_འཁོལ་གདུང་	Kholdoong
Khaling ཁ་གླིང་	Gomchhu Kholdoong སྒོམ་ཆུ་_འཁོལ་གདུང་	Lemang
Khaling ཁ་གླིང་	Gomchhu Kholdoong སྒོམ་ཆུ་_འཁོལ་གདུང་	Tshangpo
Khaling ཁ་གླིང་	Barshong བར་ཤོང་	Barshong
Khaling ཁ་གླིང་	Jiri Lemi ཇི་རི་_ལེ་མི་	Jiri
Khaling ཁ་གླིང་	Jiri Lemi ཇི་རི་_ལེ་མི་	Lemi
Khaling ཁ་གླིང་	Jiri Lemi ཇི་རི་_ལེ་མི་	Lemi Chhamzor
Khaling ཁ་གླིང་	Jiri Lemi ཇི་རི་_ལེ་མི་	Liza
Lumang ཀླུ་མང་	Drubkhang Lumang གྲུབ་ཁང་_ཀླུ་རྨང་	Dori
Lumang ཀླུ་མང་	Drubkhang Lumang གྲུབ་ཁང་_ཀླུ་རྨང་	Dori Tsano
Lumang ཀླུ་མང་	Drubkhang Lumang གྲུབ་ཁང་_ཀླུ་རྨང་	Goenzor
Lumang ཀླུ་མང་	Drubkhang Lumang གྲུབ་ཁང་_ཀླུ་རྨང་	Lumang
Lumang ཀླུ་མང་	Drubkhang Lumang གྲུབ་ཁང་_ཀླུ་རྨང་	Lumang Goenzor
Lumang ཀླུ་མང་	Drubkhang Lumang གྲུབ་ཁང་_ཀླུ་རྨང་	Lumang Gomtshang
Lumang ཀླུ་མང་	Drubkhang Lumang གྲུབ་ཁང་_ཀླུ་རྨང་	Lumang Shachari
Lumang ཀླུ་མང་	Drubkhang Lumang གྲུབ་ཁང་_ཀླུ་རྨང་	Shachari
Lumang ཀླུ་མང་	Drubkhang Lumang གྲུབ་ཁང་_ཀླུ་རྨང་	Tsano
Lumang ཀླུ་མང་	Drubkhang Lumang གྲུབ་ཁང་_ཀླུ་རྨང་	Bargoenpa (Lumang)
Lumang ཀླུ་མང་	Drubkhang Lumang གྲུབ་ཁང་_ཀླུ་རྨང་	Daroong Wadrangzor
Lumang ཀླུ་མང་	Drubkhang Lumang གྲུབ་ཁང་_ཀླུ་རྨང་	Dubkhang
Lumang ཀླུ་མང་	Drubkhang Lumang གྲུབ་ཁང་_ཀླུ་རྨང་	Dubkhang Goenpa
Lumang ཀླུ་མང་	Drubkhang Lumang གྲུབ་ཁང་_ཀླུ་རྨང་	Jabgoen
Lumang ཀླུ་མང་	Drubkhang Lumang གྲུབ་ཁང་_ཀླུ་རྨང་	Jabgoenpa
Lumang ཀླུ་མང་	Drubkhang Lumang གྲུབ་ཁང་_ཀླུ་རྨང་	Khomin
Lumang ཀླུ་མང་	Drubkhang Lumang གྲུབ་ཁང་_ཀླུ་རྨང་	Omshari
Lumang ཀླུ་མང་	Drubkhang Lumang གྲུབ་ཁང་_ཀླུ་རྨང་	Rizang
Lumang ཀླུ་མང་	Drubkhang Lumang གྲུབ་ཁང་_ཀླུ་རྨང་	Thrimla
Lumang ཀླུ་མང་	Drubkhang Lumang གྲུབ་ཁང་_ཀླུ་རྨང་	Wadrangzor
Lumang ཀླུ་མང་	Chhengri Doongmanma ཆེངས་རི་_གདུང་མན་མ་	Bamshing
Lumang ཀླུ་མང་	Chhengri Doongmanma ཆེངས་རི་_གདུང་མན་མ་	Beamri
Lumang ཀླུ་མང་	Chhengri Doongmanma ཆེངས་རི་_གདུང་མན་མ་	Chengri
Lumang ཀླུ་མང་	Chhengri Doongmanma ཆེངས་རི་_གདུང་མན་མ་	Doomgmanma
Lumang ཀླུ་མང་	Chhengri Doongmanma ཆེངས་རི་_གདུང་མན་མ་	Khaphe
Lumang ཀླུ་མང་	Chhengri Doongmanma ཆེངས་རི་_གདུང་མན་མ་	Ragea
Lumang ཀླུ་མང་	Chhengri Doongmanma ཆེངས་རི་_གདུང་མན་མ་	Sayuel
Lumang ཀླུ་མང་	Kharphoog Kurchhilo མཁར་ཕུག་_སྐུར་ཆི་ལོ་	Darnang
Lumang ཀླུ་མང་	Kharphoog Kurchhilo མཁར་ཕུག་_སྐུར་ཆི་ལོ་	Daroong
Lumang ཀླུ་མང་	Kharphoog Kurchhilo མཁར་ཕུག་_སྐུར་ཆི་ལོ་	Deno
Lumang ཀླུ་མང་	Kharphoog Kurchhilo མཁར་ཕུག་_སྐུར་ཆི་ལོ་	Khargoen
Lumang ཀླུ་མང་	Kharphoog Kurchhilo མཁར་ཕུག་_སྐུར་ཆི་ལོ་	Kharphoo
Lumang ཀླུ་མང་	Kharphoog Kurchhilo མཁར་ཕུག་_སྐུར་ཆི་ལོ་	Kharphoogoenpa
Lumang ཀླུ་མང་	Kharphoog Kurchhilo མཁར་ཕུག་_སྐུར་ཆི་ལོ་	Kurchilo
Lumang ཀླུ་མང་	Riserboo Tsangpo རི་སེར་བུ་_གཙང་པོ་	Deno
Lumang ཀླུ་མང་	Riserboo Tsangpo རི་སེར་བུ་_གཙང་པོ་	Gaphoo
Lumang ཀླུ་མང་	Riserboo Tsangpo རི་སེར་བུ་_གཙང་པོ་	Habla
Lumang ཀླུ་མང་	Riserboo Tsangpo རི་སེར་བུ་_གཙང་པོ་	Kheri (Lumang)
Lumang ཀླུ་མང་	Riserboo Tsangpo རི་སེར་བུ་_གཙང་པོ་	Kheshing (Lumang)
Lumang ཀླུ་མང་	Riserboo Tsangpo རི་སེར་བུ་_གཙང་པོ་	Kheshing Reserbu
Lumang ཀླུ་མང་	Riserboo Tsangpo རི་སེར་བུ་_གཙང་པོ་	Kheshing Roamzor
Lumang ཀླུ་མང་	Riserboo Tsangpo རི་སེར་བུ་_གཙང་པོ་	Kheshingserbu
Lumang ཀླུ་མང་	Riserboo Tsangpo རི་སེར་བུ་_གཙང་པོ་	Reserbu
Lumang ཀླུ་མང་	Riserboo Tsangpo རི་སེར་བུ་_གཙང་པོ་	Rushingye
Lumang ཀླུ་མང་	Riserboo Tsangpo རི་སེར་བུ་_གཙང་པོ་	Sangmari
Lumang ཀླུ་མང་	Riserboo Tsangpo རི་སེར་བུ་_གཙང་པོ་	Sethang
Lumang ཀླུ་མང་	Riserboo Tsangpo རི་སེར་བུ་_གཙང་པོ་	Tashichoedling
Lumang ཀླུ་མང་	Riserboo Tsangpo རི་སེར་བུ་_གཙང་པོ་	Tshangpo
Lumang ཀླུ་མང་	Riserboo Tsangpo རི་སེར་བུ་_གཙང་པོ་	Woongang
Lumang ཀླུ་མང་	Moochhu Wakhar མུ་ཆུ་_ཝ་མཁར་	Moochhu
Lumang ཀླུ་མང་	Tshogoenpa མཚོ་དགོན་པ་	Khinying Manma
Lumang ཀླུ་མང་	Tshogoenpa མཚོ་དགོན་པ་	Thrumnang
Lumang ཀླུ་མང་	Tshogoenpa མཚོ་དགོན་པ་	Thrumnang Lishingzor
Lumang ཀླུ་མང་	Tshogoenpa མཚོ་དགོན་པ་	Wamrong
Merag མེ་རག་	Merag Toed མེ་རག་སྟོད་	Merag Toed
Merag མེ་རག་	Merag Maed མེ་རག་སྨད་	Merag Maed
Merag མེ་རག་	Gyengo གྱེན་འགོ་	Gyengo
Merag མེ་རག་	Khashateng ཁ་ཤཱ་སྟེངས་	Khashateng
Merag མེ་རག་	Khiliphoo ཁི་ལི་ཕུ་	Khiliphoo
Merag མེ་རག་	Khiliphoo ཁི་ལི་ཕུ་	Chelephoo
Phongmed ཕོངས་མེད་	Phongmed ཕོངས་མེད་	Bargoenpa
Phongmed ཕོངས་མེད་	Phongmed ཕོངས་མེད་	Bumtang
Phongmed ཕོངས་མེད་	Phongmed ཕོངས་མེད་	Dorshing
Phongmed ཕོངས་མེད་	Phongmed ཕོངས་མེད་	Lhakhang
Phongmed ཕོངས་མེད་	Phongmed ཕོངས་མེད་	Momnangkhar
Phongmed ཕོངས་མེད་	Phongmed ཕོངས་མེད་	Shingchaloo
Phongmed ཕོངས་མེད་	Phongmed ཕོངས་མེད་	Shingringmo
Phongmed ཕོངས་མེད་	Phongmed ཕོངས་མེད་	Shingkhang
Phongmed ཕོངས་མེད་	Phongmed ཕོངས་མེད་	Tathrang
Phongmed ཕོངས་མེད་	Phongmed ཕོངས་མེད་	Thrang
Phongmed ཕོངས་མེད་	Phongmed ཕོངས་མེད་	Soelkhar
Phongmed ཕོངས་མེད་	Phongmed ཕོངས་མེད་	Yerchiloo
Phongmed ཕོངས་མེད་	Thongrong མཐོང་རོང་	Banyalting
Phongmed ཕོངས་མེད་	Thongrong མཐོང་རོང་	Brang
Phongmed ཕོངས་མེད་	Thongrong མཐོང་རོང་	Thongrong
Phongmed ཕོངས་མེད་	Lem གླེམ་	Demkhar
Phongmed ཕོངས་མེད་	Lem གླེམ་	Gadzari
Phongmed ཕོངས་མེད་	Lem གླེམ་	Karmagoenpa
Phongmed ཕོངས་མེད་	Lem གླེམ་	Kharpa
Phongmed ཕོངས་མེད་	Lem གླེམ་	Lem
Phongmed ཕོངས་མེད་	Yabrang ཡ་བྲང་	Janyema
Phongmed ཕོངས་མེད་	Yabrang ཡ་བྲང་	Pengtse
Phongmed ཕོངས་མེད་	Yabrang ཡ་བྲང་	Yabrang
Phongmed ཕོངས་མེད་	Phimshong ཕིམ་ཤོང་	Phimshong
Radi ར་དི་	Pakaling པ་ཀ་གླིང་	Chamang
Radi ར་དི་	Pakaling པ་ཀ་གླིང་	Doongsam
Radi ར་དི་	Pakaling པ་ཀ་གླིང་	Khudumpang
Radi ར་དི་	Pakaling པ་ཀ་གླིང་	Pakaling
Radi ར་དི་	Dekidling Tsenkhar བདེ་སྐྱིད་གླིང་_བཙན་མཁར་	Doongshing/Tshatshey
Radi ར་དི་	Dekidling Tsenkhar བདེ་སྐྱིད་གླིང་_བཙན་མཁར་	Joenla Tshetshe
Radi ར་དི་	Dekidling Tsenkhar བདེ་སྐྱིད་གླིང་_བཙན་མཁར་	Joenlapam
Radi ར་དི་	Dekidling Tsenkhar བདེ་སྐྱིད་གླིང་_བཙན་མཁར་	Dekidling
Radi ར་དི་	Dekidling Tsenkhar བདེ་སྐྱིད་གླིང་_བཙན་མཁར་	Deling
Radi ར་དི་	Dekidling Tsenkhar བདེ་སྐྱིད་གླིང་_བཙན་མཁར་	Pangthang
Radi ར་དི་	Dekidling Tsenkhar བདེ་སྐྱིད་གླིང་_བཙན་མཁར་	Radhi Pangthang
Radi ར་དི་	Dekidling Tsenkhar བདེ་སྐྱིད་གླིང་_བཙན་མཁར་	Tsengkhar
Radi ར་དི་	Tonglingpam སྟོངས་གླིང་སྤམ་	Doon Goen
Radi ར་དི་	Tonglingpam སྟོངས་གླིང་སྤམ་	Thangthrang
Radi ར་དི་	Tonglingpam སྟོངས་གླིང་སྤམ་	Tongling Pam
Radi ར་དི་	Tonglingpam སྟོངས་གླིང་སྤམ་	Tongling Pangthang
Radi ར་དི་	Tonglingpam སྟོངས་གླིང་སྤམ་	Tongling Tangthrang
Radi ར་དི་	Tonglingpam སྟོངས་གླིང་སྤམ་	Tongling Thrang
Radi ར་དི་	Kadam བཀའ་དམ་	Kadam
Radi ར་དི་	Kadam བཀའ་དམ་	Tongling Khatoe
Radi ར་དི་	Kadam བཀའ་དམ་	Langteng
Radi ར་དི་	Kadam བཀའ་དམ་	Tongling Kadam
Radi ར་དི་	Kadam བཀའ་དམ་	Boongmaen
Radi ར་དི་	Kadam བཀའ་དམ་	Chhima
Radi ར་དི་	Kadam བཀའ་དམ་	Melongkhar
Radi ར་དི་	Nagtshang Togshingmang སྣག་ཚང་_རྟོག་ཤིང་མང་	Nagtshang
Radi ར་དི་	Nagtshang Togshingmang སྣག་ཚང་_རྟོག་ཤིང་མང་	Pajogoenpa
Radi ར་དི་	Nagtshang Togshingmang སྣག་ཚང་_རྟོག་ཤིང་མང་	Togshingmang
Sagteng སག་སྟེང་	Sagteng སག་སྟེང་	Sagteng
Sagteng སག་སྟེང་	Joenkhar Moorbi བྱོང་ཁར་_མུར་སྦི་	Burnlog
Sagteng སག་སྟེང་	Joenkhar Moorbi བྱོང་ཁར་_མུར་སྦི་	Melam Thoong
Sagteng སག་སྟེང་	Joenkhar Moorbi བྱོང་ཁར་_མུར་སྦི་	Moorbi
Sagteng སག་སྟེང་	Joenkhar Moorbi བྱོང་ཁར་_མུར་སྦི་	Sagteng Joenkhar
Sagteng སག་སྟེང་	Joenkhar Moorbi བྱོང་ཁར་_མུར་སྦི་	Tholong
Sagteng སག་སྟེང་	Joenkhar Moorbi བྱོང་ཁར་_མུར་སྦི་	Youngbazor
Sagteng སག་སྟེང་	Thagthri ཁྲག་ཁྲི་	Sagteng Thagthri
Sagteng སག་སྟེང་	Borangmang Borangtse སྦོ་རང་རྨང་_་སྦོ་རང་རྩེ་	Borangmang
Sagteng སག་སྟེང་	Borangmang Borangtse སྦོ་རང་རྨང་_་སྦོ་རང་རྩེ་	Borangtse
Sagteng སག་སྟེང་	Borangmang Borangtse སྦོ་རང་རྨང་_་སྦོ་རང་རྩེ་	Sagteng Manirong
Sagteng སག་སྟེང་	Pusa Tenmang སྤུ་ས་_རྟེན་མང་	Sagteng Pusa
Sagteng སག་སྟེང་	Pusa Tenmang སྤུ་ས་_རྟེན་མང་	Sagteng Tenmang
Samkhar བསམ་མཁར་	Maelphel Samkhar མེལ་འཕེལ་_བསམ་མཁར་	Maelphel
Samkhar བསམ་མཁར་	Maelphel Samkhar མེལ་འཕེལ་_བསམ་མཁར་	Samkhar
Samkhar བསམ་མཁར་	Khabti Lungtenzampa ཁབས་སྟི་_ལུང་བསྟང་ཟམ་པ་	Khabti
Samkhar བསམ་མཁར་	Bikhar Domkhar བི་མཁར་_དོན་མཁར་	Bikhar
Samkhar བསམ་མཁར་	Kapang Yenangdrangsa ཀ་སྤང་_ཡེ་ནང་བྲང་ས་	Yenangbrangsa
Samkhar བསམ་མཁར་	Rangzhikhar Serdrang རང་གཞི་མཁར་_སེར་བྲང་	Rangshinkhar
Samkhar བསམ་མཁར་	Chagzam Pam ལྕགས་ཟམ་_སྤམ་	Pam
Shongphoog ཤོང་ཕུག་	Dramin Shongphoog བྲ་མིན་_ཤོང་ཕུག་	Shongphoog
Shongphoog ཤོང་ཕུག་	Chhangmi Rangjoong འཆང་མི་_རང་འབྱུང་	Chhangmi
Shongphoog ཤོང་ཕུག་	Chhangmi Rangjoong འཆང་མི་_རང་འབྱུང་	Rangjoong
Shongphoog ཤོང་ཕུག་	Galing དགའ་གླིང་	Galing
Shongphoog ཤོང་ཕུག་	Gongtsephangma Yobinang གོང་རྩེ་ཕང་མ་_ཡོ་སྦི་ནང་	Gongtshephangma
Shongphoog ཤོང་ཕུག་	Gongtsephangma Yobinang གོང་རྩེ་ཕང་མ་_ཡོ་སྦི་ནང་	Yobinang
Shongphoog ཤོང་ཕུག་	Chaling སྐྱ་གླིང་	Chaling
Thrimshing ཁྲིམས་ཤིང་	Thrimshing ཁྲིམས་ཤིང་	Thrimshing
Thrimshing ཁྲིམས་ཤིང་	Doongsingma Tsangpo གདུང་སིང་མ་_གཙང་པོ་	Lhakhang Jab
Thrimshing ཁྲིམས་ཤིང་	Doongsingma Tsangpo གདུང་སིང་མ་_གཙང་པོ་	Tsangpo
Thrimshing ཁྲིམས་ཤིང་	Bongzor Phegpari སྦོང་ཟོར་_ཕེགས་པ་རི་	Bongzor
Thrimshing ཁྲིམས་ཤིང་	Bongzor Phegpari སྦོང་ཟོར་_ཕེགས་པ་རི་	Lam Pangthang
Thrimshing ཁྲིམས་ཤིང་	Bongzor Phegpari སྦོང་ཟོར་_ཕེགས་པ་རི་	Phakpari
Thrimshing ཁྲིམས་ཤིང་	Bongzor Phegpari སྦོང་ཟོར་_ཕེགས་པ་རི་	Bayphu
Thrimshing ཁྲིམས་ཤིང་	Ramchongma Yemkhar རམ་སྐྱོང་མ་_ཡེམ་མཁར་	Phungshing
Thrimshing ཁྲིམས་ཤིང་	Ramchongma Yemkhar རམ་སྐྱོང་མ་_ཡེམ་མཁར་	Ramchong Ma
Thrimshing ཁྲིམས་ཤིང་	Ramchongma Yemkhar རམ་སྐྱོང་མ་_ཡེམ་མཁར་	Ramchongma
Thrimshing ཁྲིམས་ཤིང་	Ramchongma Yemkhar རམ་སྐྱོང་མ་_ཡེམ་མཁར་	Yemkhar
Thrimshing ཁྲིམས་ཤིང་	Ramchongma Yemkhar རམ་སྐྱོང་མ་_ཡེམ་མཁར་	Sako
Thrimshing ཁྲིམས་ཤིང་	Berdoongma Thoongkhar སྦེར་གདུང་མ་_འཐུང་མཁར་	Thoongkhar
Thrimshing ཁྲིམས་ཤིང་	Berdoongma Thoongkhar སྦེར་གདུང་མ་_འཐུང་མཁར་	Berdoongma
Thrimshing ཁྲིམས་ཤིང་	Berdoongma Thoongkhar སྦེར་གདུང་མ་_འཐུང་མཁར་	Youngdhir
Uzorong ཨུ་མཛོ་རོང་	Benshingmo Jomtsang སྦེན་ཤིང་མོ་_འཇོམས་གཙང་	Benshingmo
Uzorong ཨུ་མཛོ་རོང་	Benshingmo Jomtsang སྦེན་ཤིང་མོ་_འཇོམས་གཙང་	Jomtshang
Uzorong ཨུ་མཛོ་རོང་	Chhiya ཕྱི་ཡ་	Chhiya
Uzorong ཨུ་མཛོ་རོང་	Rizor Yerchhilo རི་ཟོར་_གཡེལ་ཆི་ལོ་	Gongtsheri
Uzorong ཨུ་མཛོ་རོང་	Rizor Yerchhilo རི་ཟོར་_གཡེལ་ཆི་ལོ་	Mongka
Uzorong ཨུ་མཛོ་རོང་	Rizor Yerchhilo རི་ཟོར་_གཡེལ་ཆི་ལོ་	Mongyea
Uzorong ཨུ་མཛོ་རོང་	Rizor Yerchhilo རི་ཟོར་_གཡེལ་ཆི་ལོ་	Rizor
Uzorong ཨུ་མཛོ་རོང་	Rizor Yerchhilo རི་ཟོར་_གཡེལ་ཆི་ལོ་	Tshedoong
Uzorong ཨུ་མཛོ་རོང་	Rizor Yerchhilo རི་ཟོར་_གཡེལ་ཆི་ལོ་	Yerchhilo
Uzorong ཨུ་མཛོ་རོང་	Barkazor Maenkhar བར་ཀ་ཟོར་_སྨན་མཁར་	Barkazor
Uzorong ཨུ་མཛོ་རོང་	Barkazor Maenkhar བར་ཀ་ཟོར་_སྨན་མཁར་	Dayphoog
Uzorong ཨུ་མཛོ་རོང་	Barkazor Maenkhar བར་ཀ་ཟོར་_སྨན་མཁར་	Dengtsalo
Uzorong ཨུ་མཛོ་རོང་	Barkazor Maenkhar བར་ཀ་ཟོར་_སྨན་མཁར་	Lenche
Uzorong ཨུ་མཛོ་རོང་	Barkazor Maenkhar བར་ཀ་ཟོར་_སྨན་མཁར་	Maenkhar
Uzorong ཨུ་མཛོ་རོང་	Baepam སྦས་སྦམ་	Baepam
Uzorong ཨུ་མཛོ་རོང་	Baepam སྦས་སྦམ་	Dangrong
Uzorong ཨུ་མཛོ་རོང་	Baepam སྦས་སྦམ་	Geangkhar
Yangnyer ཡངས་ཉེར་	Daliphang Ragshigo ད་ལི་ཐང་_ཏག་ཤི་གོ་	Daliphang
Yangnyer ཡངས་ཉེར་	Duroong Ngambinlang དུ་རུང་_ངམ་སྦི་ནང་	Dambinang
Yangnyer ཡངས་ཉེར་	Duroong Ngambinlang དུ་རུང་_ངམ་སྦི་ནང་	Duroong
Yangnyer ཡངས་ཉེར་	Khardza Leyphoog མཁར་ཛ་_ལེ་ཕུག་	Khardza
Yangnyer ཡངས་ཉེར་	Khardza Leyphoog མཁར་ཛ་_ལེ་ཕུག་	Leyphoog
Yangnyer ཡངས་ཉེར་	Shokang Tagtagpa ཤོ་བཀང་_ཏག་ཏག་པ་	Shokang
Yangnyer ཡངས་ཉེར་	Dargyeling Kharthoong དར་རྒྱས་གླིང་_མཁར་ཐུང་	Changzoe
Yangnyer ཡངས་ཉེར་	Dargyeling Kharthoong དར་རྒྱས་གླིང་_མཁར་ཐུང་	Dargyeling
Yangnyer ཡངས་ཉེར་	Dargyeling Kharthoong དར་རྒྱས་གླིང་_མཁར་ཐུང་	Karthoong
Yangnyer ཡངས་ཉེར་	Dargyeling Kharthoong དར་རྒྱས་གླིང་_མཁར་ཐུང་	Kheri

=== Trashiyangtse District ===
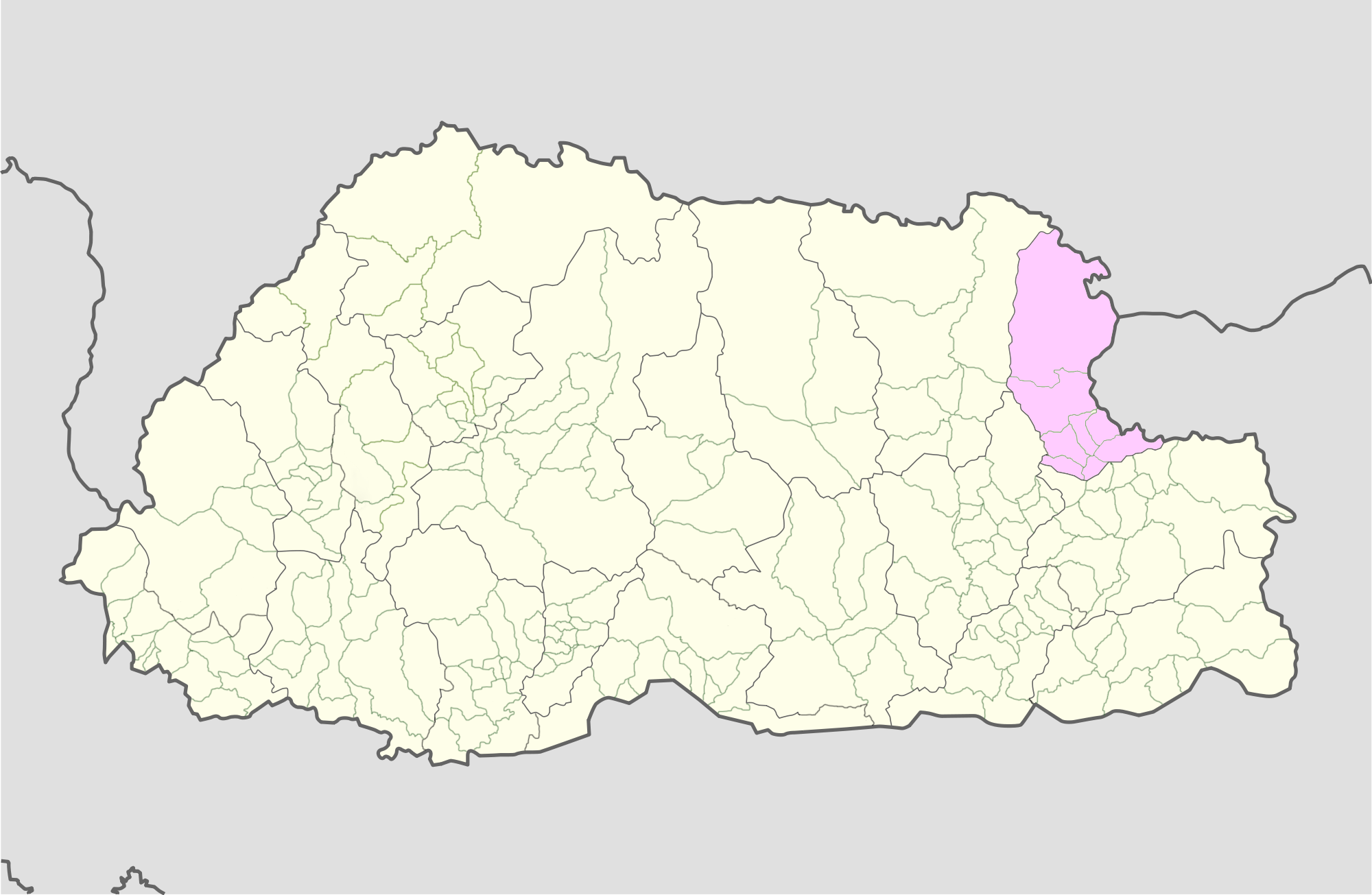
Trashiyangtse District

Gewog	Chiwog	Village
Bumdeling བུམ་སྡེ་གླིང་	Pangkhar Taphel སྤང་མཁར་_རྟ་འཕེལ་	Pangkhar
Bumdeling བུམ་སྡེ་གླིང་	Pangkhar Taphel སྤང་མཁར་_རྟ་འཕེལ་	Panglewog
Bumdeling བུམ་སྡེ་གླིང་	Pangkhar Taphel སྤང་མཁར་_རྟ་འཕེལ་	Taphel
Bumdeling བུམ་སྡེ་གླིང་	Bomdir Wogmanang སྦོམ་འདིར་_འོག་མ་ནང་	Bomdir
Bumdeling བུམ་སྡེ་གླིང་	Bomdir Wogmanang སྦོམ་འདིར་_འོག་མ་ནང་	Wogmanang
Bumdeling བུམ་སྡེ་གླིང་	Betsamang སྦེ་རྩ་མང་	Betsamang
Bumdeling བུམ་སྡེ་གླིང་	Ngalimang Phanteng ང་ལི་མང་_ཕན་སྟེང་	Ngalimang
Bumdeling བུམ་སྡེ་གླིང་	Ngalimang Phanteng ང་ལི་མང་_ཕན་སྟེང་	Phanteng
Bumdeling བུམ་སྡེ་གླིང་	Gangkhardoong Tshaling སྒང་མཁར་དུང་_ཚྭ་གླིང་	Gangkhardoong
Bumdeling བུམ་སྡེ་གླིང་	Gangkhardoong Tshaling སྒང་མཁར་དུང་_ཚྭ་གླིང་	Tshaling
Jamkhar འཇམ་མཁར་	Laishoom Largyab ལའི་ཤུམ་_ལར་རྒྱབ་	Largyab
Jamkhar འཇམ་མཁར་	Chhema Tagchhema ཕྱེ་མ་_སྟག་ཕྱེ་མ་	Chhema (Jamkhar)
Jamkhar འཇམ་མཁར་	Chhema Tagchhema ཕྱེ་མ་_སྟག་ཕྱེ་མ་	Tag Chhema
Jamkhar འཇམ་མཁར་	Neydrag Pachhu གནས་བྲག་_སྤ་ཆུ་	Neydrag
Jamkhar འཇམ་མཁར་	Neydrag Pachhu གནས་བྲག་_སྤ་ཆུ་	Pachhu
Jamkhar འཇམ་མཁར་	Shingkhar Tongla ཤིང་མཁར་_སྟོང་ལ་	Shingkhar
Jamkhar འཇམ་མཁར་	Shingkhar Tongla ཤིང་མཁར་_སྟོང་ལ་	Tongla
Jamkhar འཇམ་མཁར་	Rijoong Yoob རི་འབྱུང་_ཡུབ་	Rijoong
Jamkhar འཇམ་མཁར་	Rijoong Yoob རི་འབྱུང་_ཡུབ་	Yoob
Jamkhar འཇམ་མཁར་	Rijoong Yoob རི་འབྱུང་_ཡུབ་	Domshing
Jamkhar འཇམ་མཁར་	Rijoong Yoob རི་འབྱུང་_ཡུབ་	Zor (Jamkhar)
Khamdang ཁམས་དྭངས་	Dungtse Lengkhar དུང་རྩེ་_གླེང་མཁར་	Lengkhar
Khamdang ཁམས་དྭངས་	Dungtse Lengkhar དུང་རྩེ་_གླེང་མཁར་	Paychateng
Khamdang ཁམས་དྭངས་	Domtshang Karmazom དོམ་ཚང་_ཀརྨ་འཛོམས་	Domtshang
Khamdang ཁམས་དྭངས་	Domtshang Karmazom དོམ་ཚང་_ཀརྨ་འཛོམས་	Gardung
Khamdang ཁམས་དྭངས་	Domtshang Karmazom དོམ་ཚང་_ཀརྨ་འཛོམས་	Karmazom
Khamdang ཁམས་དྭངས་	Domtshang Karmazom དོམ་ཚང་_ཀརྨ་འཛོམས་	Kilkhorchen
Khamdang ཁམས་དྭངས་	Domtshang Karmazom དོམ་ཚང་_ཀརྨ་འཛོམས་	Rabdeling
Khamdang ཁམས་དྭངས་	Domtshang Karmazom དོམ་ཚང་_ཀརྨ་འཛོམས་	Shakshing
Khamdang ཁམས་དྭངས་	Domtshang Karmazom དོམ་ཚང་_ཀརྨ་འཛོམས་	Daka
Khamdang ཁམས་དྭངས་	Serpang Shalli གསེར་སྤང་_ཤ་ལི་	Dengloom
Khamdang ཁམས་དྭངས་	Serpang Shalli གསེར་སྤང་_ཤ་ལི་	Koenchobling
Khamdang ཁམས་དྭངས་	Serpang Shalli གསེར་སྤང་_ཤ་ལི་	Ngalamang
Khamdang ཁམས་དྭངས་	Serpang Shalli གསེར་སྤང་_ཤ་ལི་	Pam
Khamdang ཁམས་དྭངས་	Serpang Shalli གསེར་སྤང་_ཤ་ལི་	Serpang
Khamdang ཁམས་དྭངས་	Serpang Shalli གསེར་སྤང་_ཤ་ལི་	Shalli
Khamdang ཁམས་དྭངས་	Nombaring Shazam རྣོམ་བ་རིང་_ཤ་ཟམ་	Dolepchen
Khamdang ཁམས་དྭངས་	Nombaring Shazam རྣོམ་བ་རིང་_ཤ་ཟམ་	Shazam
Khamdang ཁམས་དྭངས་	Nombaring Shazam རྣོམ་བ་རིང་_ཤ་ཟམ་	Nombaring
Khamdang ཁམས་དྭངས་	Nombaring Shazam རྣོམ་བ་རིང་_ཤ་ཟམ་	Zharatshi
Khamdang ཁམས་དྭངས་	Khamdang Manla ཁམས་དྭངས་_མན་ལ་	Khamdang
Ramjar རམ་སྦྱར་	Domtshang Doongmaen དོམ་ཚང་_གདུང་སྨན་	Domtshang
Ramjar རམ་སྦྱར་	Domtshang Doongmaen དོམ་ཚང་_གདུང་སྨན་	Doongmaen
Ramjar རམ་སྦྱར་	Domtshang Doongmaen དོམ་ཚང་_གདུང་སྨན་	Kakaney
Ramjar རམ་སྦྱར་	Domtshang Doongmaen དོམ་ཚང་_གདུང་སྨན་	Khiri
Ramjar རམ་སྦྱར་	Domtshang Doongmaen དོམ་ཚང་_གདུང་སྨན་	Laybari
Ramjar རམ་སྦྱར་	Domtshang Doongmaen དོམ་ཚང་_གདུང་སྨན་	Nagtshang
Ramjar རམ་སྦྱར་	Domtshang Doongmaen དོམ་ཚང་_གདུང་སྨན་	Pangthang
Ramjar རམ་སྦྱར་	Domtshang Doongmaen དོམ་ཚང་_གདུང་སྨན་	Phairawa
Ramjar རམ་སྦྱར་	Bawoong བ་འུང་	Bawoong
Ramjar རམ་སྦྱར་	Khalapangthang Tsangrong ཁ་ལ་སྤང་ཐང་_གཙང་རོང་	Goenpa
Ramjar རམ་སྦྱར་	Khalapangthang Tsangrong ཁ་ལ་སྤང་ཐང་_གཙང་རོང་	Khalapangthang
Ramjar རམ་སྦྱར་	Khalapangthang Tsangrong ཁ་ལ་སྤང་ཐང་_གཙང་རོང་	Tsang-Rong
Ramjar རམ་སྦྱར་	Lengbartang Woongkhar ལེང་བར་ལྟང་_འུང་མགྷར་	Lengbartang
Ramjar རམ་སྦྱར་	Lengbartang Woongkhar ལེང་བར་ལྟང་_འུང་མགྷར་	Aringborang
Ramjar རམ་སྦྱར་	Lengbartang Woongkhar ལེང་བར་ལྟང་_འུང་མགྷར་	Gongshing
Ramjar རམ་སྦྱར་	Lengbartang Woongkhar ལེང་བར་ལྟང་_འུང་མགྷར་	Thongzor
Ramjar རམ་སྦྱར་	Lengbartang Woongkhar ལེང་བར་ལྟང་_འུང་མགྷར་	Tshotsang
Ramjar རམ་སྦྱར་	Lengbartang Woongkhar ལེང་བར་ལྟང་_འུང་མགྷར་	Tshurkhar
Ramjar རམ་སྦྱར་	Lengbartang Woongkhar ལེང་བར་ལྟང་_འུང་མགྷར་	Tsushing
Ramjar རམ་སྦྱར་	Lengbartang Woongkhar ལེང་བར་ལྟང་_འུང་མགྷར་	Woongkhar
Ramjar རམ་སྦྱར་	Lengbartang Woongkhar ལེང་བར་ལྟང་_འུང་མགྷར་	Zorthoong
Ramjar རམ་སྦྱར་	Bainangreb Romang སྦའི་ནང་རེབ་_རོ་མང་	Bainang-Reb
Ramjar རམ་སྦྱར་	Bainangreb Romang སྦའི་ནང་རེབ་_རོ་མང་	Bar Dzong
Ramjar རམ་སྦྱར་	Bainangreb Romang སྦའི་ནང་རེབ་_རོ་མང་	Gochang
Ramjar རམ་སྦྱར་	Bainangreb Romang སྦའི་ནང་རེབ་_རོ་མང་	Lalam
Ramjar རམ་སྦྱར་	Bainangreb Romang སྦའི་ནང་རེབ་_རོ་མང་	Lemrang
Ramjar རམ་སྦྱར་	Bainangreb Romang སྦའི་ནང་རེབ་_རོ་མང་	Lushing
Ramjar རམ་སྦྱར་	Bainangreb Romang སྦའི་ནང་རེབ་_རོ་མང་	Maenshing
Ramjar རམ་སྦྱར་	Bainangreb Romang སྦའི་ནང་རེབ་_རོ་མང་	Romang
Ramjar རམ་སྦྱར་	Bainangreb Romang སྦའི་ནང་རེབ་_རོ་མང་	Shangthang
Ramjar རམ་སྦྱར་	Bainangreb Romang སྦའི་ནང་རེབ་_རོ་མང་	Tag Dzong
Ramjar རམ་སྦྱར་	Bainangreb Romang སྦའི་ནང་རེབ་_རོ་མང་	Tsenkang
Ramjar རམ་སྦྱར་	Bainangreb Romang སྦའི་ནང་རེབ་_རོ་མང་	Zor (Ramjar)
Toetsho སྟོད་མཚོ་	Nangkhar Seb ནང་མཁར་_གསེབ་	Nangkhar goenpa
Toetsho སྟོད་མཚོ་	Nangkhar Seb ནང་མཁར་_གསེབ་	Pangthang Goenpa
Toetsho སྟོད་མཚོ་	Nangkhar Seb ནང་མཁར་_གསེབ་	Pungthung
Toetsho སྟོད་མཚོ་	Nangkhar Seb ནང་མཁར་_གསེབ་	Dungtse
Toetsho སྟོད་མཚོ་	Nangkhar Seb ནང་མཁར་_གསེབ་	Choklabtsa
Toetsho སྟོད་མཚོ་	Nangkhar Seb ནང་མཁར་_གསེབ་	Seb
Toetsho སྟོད་མཚོ་	Nangkhar Seb ནང་མཁར་_གསེབ་	Sengphu
Toetsho སྟོད་མཚོ་	Jangphoogtse Thangdoong བྱང་ཕུག་རྩེ་_ཐང་དུང་	Jangphoogtse
Toetsho སྟོད་མཚོ་	Jangphoogtse Thangdoong བྱང་ཕུག་རྩེ་_ཐང་དུང་	Thangdang
Toetsho སྟོད་མཚོ་	Maeldoong མལ་གདུང་	Chaymkhar
Toetsho སྟོད་མཚོ་	Maeldoong མལ་གདུང་	Dumang
Toetsho སྟོད་མཚོ་	Maeldoong མལ་གདུང་	Maeldoong
Toetsho སྟོད་མཚོ་	Maeldoong མལ་གདུང་	Pajab
Toetsho སྟོད་མཚོ་	Maeldoong མལ་གདུང་	Omba
Toetsho སྟོད་མཚོ་	Maeldoong མལ་གདུང་	Tshengang
Toetsho སྟོད་མཚོ་	Sertsho གསེར་མཚོ་	Bangkhabchen
Toetsho སྟོད་མཚོ་	Sertsho གསེར་མཚོ་	Dagtsa
Toetsho སྟོད་མཚོ་	Sertsho གསེར་མཚོ་	Khoblakhar
Toetsho སྟོད་མཚོ་	Sertsho གསེར་མཚོ་	Sertsho
Toetsho སྟོད་མཚོ་	Khinyel Togshing ཁྱི་ཉལ་_ལྟོག་ཤིང་	Bagpa (Toetsho)
Toetsho སྟོད་མཚོ་	Khinyel Togshing ཁྱི་ཉལ་_ལྟོག་ཤིང་	Khi-Nyel
Toetsho སྟོད་མཚོ་	Khinyel Togshing ཁྱི་ཉལ་_ལྟོག་ཤིང་	Togshing
Toetsho སྟོད་མཚོ་	Chhemkhar Manam ཆེམ་མཁར_མ་ནམ་	Chhemkhar
Toetsho སྟོད་མཚོ་	Chhemkhar Manam ཆེམ་མཁར_མ་ནམ་	Manam
Tongmizhangsa སྟོང་མི་གཞང་ས་	Maenchhu Tsangdoong སྨན་ཆུ་_གཙང་གདུང་	Memmong
Tongmizhangsa སྟོང་མི་གཞང་ས་	Maenchhu Tsangdoong སྨན་ཆུ་_གཙང་གདུང་	Maenchhu
Tongmizhangsa སྟོང་མི་གཞང་ས་	Maenchhu Tsangdoong སྨན་ཆུ་_གཙང་གདུང་	Tsangdoong
Tongmizhangsa སྟོང་མི་གཞང་ས་	Maenchhu Tsangdoong སྨན་ཆུ་_གཙང་གདུང་	Wogkhar
Tongmizhangsa སྟོང་མི་གཞང་ས་	Pang Lhauzhing སྤང་_ལྷའུ་ཞིང་	Dongkashing
Tongmizhangsa སྟོང་མི་གཞང་ས་	Pang Lhauzhing སྤང་_ལྷའུ་ཞིང་	Dongshing
Tongmizhangsa སྟོང་མི་གཞང་ས་	Pang Lhauzhing སྤང་_ལྷའུ་ཞིང་	Dongtoed
Tongmizhangsa སྟོང་མི་གཞང་ས་	Pang Lhauzhing སྤང་_ལྷའུ་ཞིང་	Lhauzhing
Tongmizhangsa སྟོང་མི་གཞང་ས་	Pang Lhauzhing སྤང་_ལྷའུ་ཞིང་	Pang
Tongmizhangsa སྟོང་མི་གཞང་ས་	Pang Lhauzhing སྤང་_ལྷའུ་ཞིང་	Toka
Tongmizhangsa སྟོང་མི་གཞང་ས་	Changmadoong Shoganang ལྕང་མ་གདུང་_ཤོ་ག་ནང་	Changmadoong
Tongmizhangsa སྟོང་མི་གཞང་ས་	Bagpa Kuenzangling བག་པ་_ཀུན་བཟང་གླིང་	Bagpa (Tomizangsa)
Tongmizhangsa སྟོང་མི་གཞང་ས་	Bagpa Kuenzangling བག་པ་_ཀུན་བཟང་གླིང་	Kenmong
Tongmizhangsa སྟོང་མི་གཞང་ས་	Bagpa Kuenzangling བག་པ་_ཀུན་བཟང་གླིང་	Kuenzangling
Tongmizhangsa སྟོང་མི་གཞང་ས་	Bainangkhar Gomkor སྦའི་ནང་མཁར་_སྒོམ་བསྐོར་	Bainangkhar
Tongmizhangsa སྟོང་མི་གཞང་ས་	Bainangkhar Gomkor སྦའི་ནང་མཁར་_སྒོམ་བསྐོར་	Gomkor
Yalang ཡ་ལང་	Doogti Gashing སྡུག་སྟི་_དགའ་ཤིང་	Doogti
Yalang ཡ་ལང་	Chhema Melongkhar ཆེ་མ་_མེ་ལོང་མཁར་	Chhema (Yalang)
Yalang ཡ་ལང་	Chhema Melongkhar ཆེ་མ་_མེ་ལོང་མཁར་	Melongkhar
Yalang ཡ་ལང་	Namthi Yarphel གནམ་འཐི་_ཡར་འཕེལ་	Namthi
Yalang ཡ་ལང་	Namthi Yarphel གནམ་འཐི་_ཡར་འཕེལ་	Yarphel
Yalang ཡ་ལང་	Rolam Thragom རོ་ལམ་_ཁྲ་སྒོམ་	Rolam
Yalang ཡ་ལང་	Rolam Thragom རོ་ལམ་_ཁྲ་སྒོམ་	Bamchang
Yalang ཡ་ལང་	Rolam Thragom རོ་ལམ་_ཁྲ་སྒོམ་	Rinzin Toenpang
Yalang ཡ་ལང་	Rolam Thragom རོ་ལམ་_ཁྲ་སྒོམ་	Thragom
Yalang ཡ་ལང་	Phugyang Yalang ཕུ་ཡངས་_ཡ་ལང་	Phuyang
Yalang ཡ་ལང་	Phugyang Yalang ཕུ་ཡངས་_ཡ་ལང་	Yalang
Yangtse གཡང་རྩེ་	Bayling སྦས་གླིང་	Bayling
Yangtse གཡང་རྩེ་	Lichen གླི་ཅན་	Li-chen
Yangtse གཡང་རྩེ་	Baney Bimkhar སྦ་གནས་_སྦིམ་མཁར་	Baney
Yangtse གཡང་རྩེ་	Baney Bimkhar སྦ་གནས་_སྦིམ་མཁར་	Bimkhar
Yangtse གཡང་རྩེ་	Gangkhar སྒང་མཁར་	Gangkhar
Yangtse གཡང་རྩེ་	Rabti རབ་སྟི་	Rabti

=== Trongsa District ===
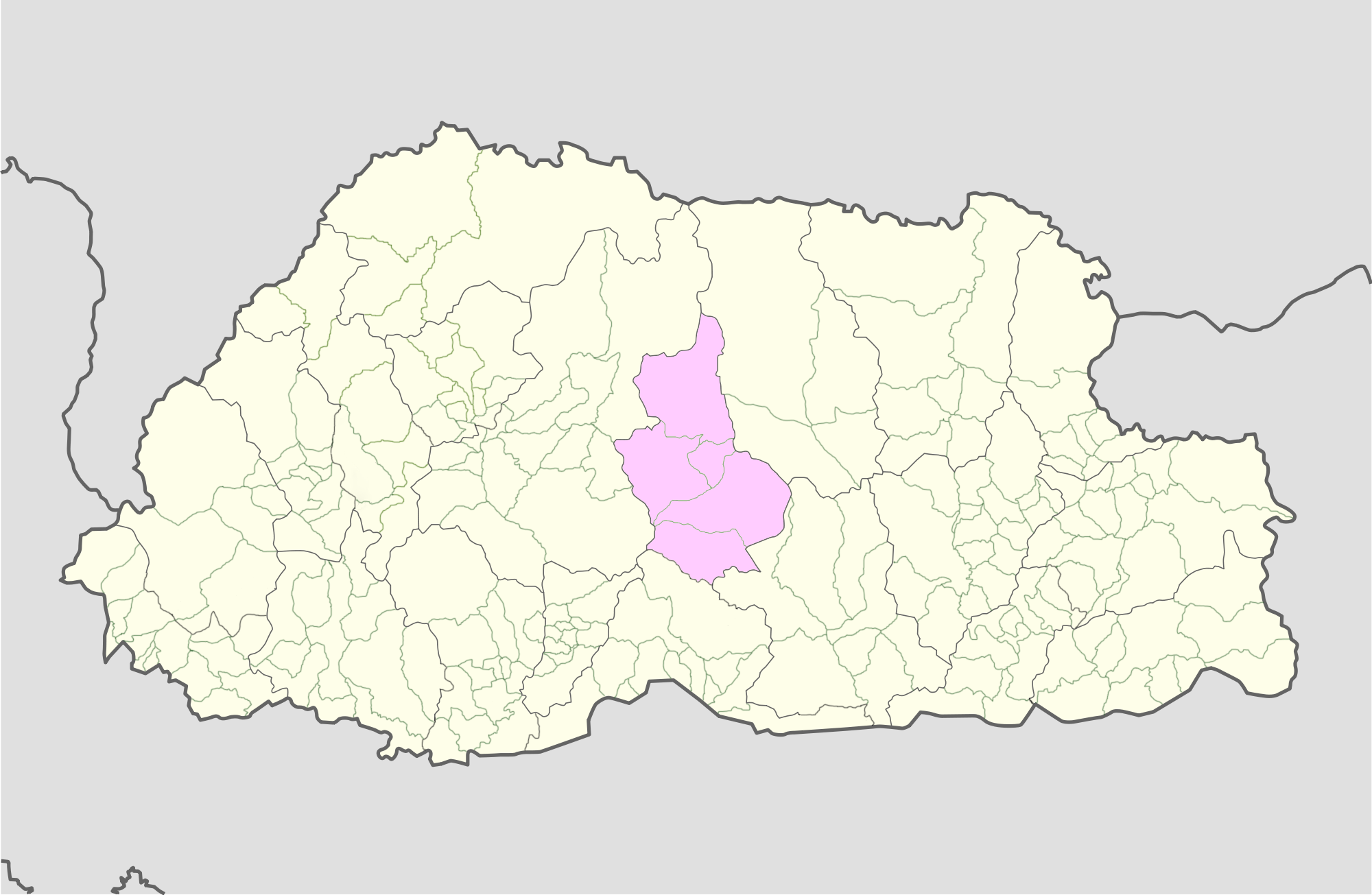
Trongsa District

Gewog	Chiwog	Village
Dragteng བྲག་སྟེང་	Tagtse Tashidingkha སྟག་རྩེ་_བཀྲིས་སྡིང་ཁ་	Tagtse
Dragteng བྲག་སྟེང་	Tagtse Tashidingkha སྟག་རྩེ་_བཀྲིས་སྡིང་ཁ་	Tashidingkha
Dragteng བྲག་སྟེང་	Uesar གཡུས་གསར་	Uesar
Dragteng བྲག་སྟེང་	Kuenga Rabten ཀུན་དགའ་རབ་བརྟེན་	Kuenga Rabten
Dragteng བྲག་སྟེང་	Kuenga Rabten ཀུན་དགའ་རབ་བརྟེན་	Changray
Dragteng བྲག་སྟེང་	Kuenga Rabten ཀུན་དགའ་རབ་བརྟེན་	Draagteng
Dragteng བྲག་སྟེང་	Kuenga Rabten ཀུན་དགའ་རབ་བརྟེན་	Samling Wangthang
Dragteng བྲག་སྟེང་	Samling Khatoed བསམ་གླིང་ཁསྟོད་	Samchhoeling
Dragteng བྲག་སྟེང་	Samling Khatoed བསམ་གླིང་ཁསྟོད་	Samling Churak
Dragteng བྲག་སྟེང་	Samling Khatoed བསམ་གླིང་ཁསྟོད་	Samling Churatak
Dragteng བྲག་སྟེང་	Samling Khatoed བསམ་གླིང་ཁསྟོད་	Samling Dangrey
Dragteng བྲག་སྟེང་	Samling Khatoed བསམ་གླིང་ཁསྟོད་	Samling Dara
Dragteng བྲག་སྟེང་	Samling Khatoed བསམ་གླིང་ཁསྟོད་	Samling Kikhornang
Dragteng བྲག་སྟེང་	Samling Khatoed བསམ་གླིང་ཁསྟོད་	Samling Phokchen
Dragteng བྲག་སྟེང་	Samling Khatoed བསམ་གླིང་ཁསྟོད་	Samling Ta-Dzong
Dragteng བྲག་སྟེང་	Samling Khatoed བསམ་གླིང་ཁསྟོད་	Samling Gomola
Dragteng བྲག་སྟེང་	Samling Khatoed བསམ་གླིང་ཁསྟོད་	Samling Kurbi
Dragteng བྲག་སྟེང་	Samling Khatoed བསམ་གླིང་ཁསྟོད་	Samling Majaling
Dragteng བྲག་སྟེང་	Samling Khatoed བསམ་གླིང་ཁསྟོད་	Samling Malingbung
Dragteng བྲག་སྟེང་	Samling Khatoed བསམ་གླིང་ཁསྟོད་	Samling Malingjug
Dragteng བྲག་སྟེང་	Samling Khatoed བསམ་གླིང་ཁསྟོད་	Samling Pingkhar
Dragteng བྲག་སྟེང་	Samling Khatoed བསམ་གླིང་ཁསྟོད་	Samling Theling
Dragteng བྲག་སྟེང་	Samling Khatoed བསམ་གླིང་ཁསྟོད་	Samling Zhewthang
Dragteng བྲག་སྟེང་	Samling Khatoed བསམ་གླིང་ཁསྟོད་	Samling Maling
Dragteng བྲག་སྟེང་	Samling Khatoed བསམ་གླིང་ཁསྟོད་	Samling Shingkhar
Dragteng བྲག་སྟེང་	Samling Khamaed བསམ་གླིང་ཁ་སྨད་	Samling Pisinang
Dragteng བྲག་སྟེང་	Samling Khamaed བསམ་གླིང་ཁ་སྨད་	Samling Shangthong
Dragteng བྲག་སྟེང་	Samling Khamaed བསམ་གླིང་ཁ་སྨད་	Samling Shangthongjab
Dragteng བྲག་སྟེང་	Samling Khamaed བསམ་གླིང་ཁ་སྨད་	Samling Tsekunang
Dragteng བྲག་སྟེང་	Samling Khamaed བསམ་གླིང་ཁ་སྨད་	Samling Tshajab
Dragteng བྲག་སྟེང་	Samling Khamaed བསམ་གླིང་ཁ་སྨད་	Samling Yumchen
Dragteng བྲག་སྟེང་	Samling Khamaed བསམ་གླིང་ཁ་སྨད་	Samling Chala
Dragteng བྲག་སྟེང་	Samling Khamaed བསམ་གླིང་ཁ་སྨད་	Samling Khamaed
Dragteng བྲག་སྟེང་	Samling Khamaed བསམ་གླིང་ཁ་སྨད་	Samling Kingacholing
Dragteng བྲག་སྟེང་	Samling Khamaed བསམ་གླིང་ཁ་སྨད་	Samling Kormaed
Dragteng བྲག་སྟེང་	Samling Khamaed བསམ་གླིང་ཁ་སྨད་	Samling Lhakhangjab
Dragteng བྲག་སྟེང་	Samling Khamaed བསམ་གླིང་ཁ་སྨད་	Samling Lhakhangwog
Dragteng བྲག་སྟེང་	Samling Khamaed བསམ་གླིང་ཁ་སྨད་	Samling Marzhing
Dragteng བྲག་སྟེང་	Samling Khamaed བསམ་གླིང་ཁ་སྨད་	Samling Pesinang
Dragteng བྲག་སྟེང་	Samling Khamaed བསམ་གླིང་ཁ་སྨད་	Samling Pongpa
Dragteng བྲག་སྟེང་	Samling Khamaed བསམ་གླིང་ཁ་སྨད་	Samling Tangchen
Dragteng བྲག་སྟེང་	Samling Khamaed བསམ་གླིང་ཁ་སྨད་	Samling Tshokunang
Dragteng བྲག་སྟེང་	Samling Khamaed བསམ་གླིང་ཁ་སྨད་	Samling Zarchen
Dragteng བྲག་སྟེང་	Samling Khamaed བསམ་གླིང་ཁ་སྨད་	Phelchung
Dragteng བྲག་སྟེང་	Samling Khamaed བསམ་གླིང་ཁ་སྨད་	Reyphel
Korphoog སྐོར་ཕུག་	Nabi མནའ་སྦིས་	Nabi
Korphoog སྐོར་ཕུག་	Korphoog Toed སྐོར་ཕུག་སྟོད་	Korphoog Toed
Korphoog སྐོར་ཕུག་	Korphoog Maed སྐོར་ཕུག་སྨད་	Korphoog Maed
Korphoog སྐོར་ཕུག་	Nyimzhong Toed ཉིམ་ཞོང་སྟོད་	Nyimzhong Toed
Korphoog སྐོར་ཕུག་	Nyimzhong Maed ཉིམ་ཞོང་སྨད་	Nyimzhong Maed
Langthil གླང་མཐིལ་	Langthil གླང་མཐིལ་	Langthil
Langthil གླང་མཐིལ་	Langthil གླང་མཐིལ་	Ngadak
Langthil གླང་མཐིལ་	Dangdoong དངས་དུང་	Bayzam
Langthil གླང་མཐིལ་	Dangdoong དངས་དུང་	Dandung
Langthil གླང་མཐིལ་	Dangdoong དངས་དུང་	Koshala
Langthil གླང་མཐིལ་	Dangdoong དངས་དུང་	Ngomey
Langthil གླང་མཐིལ་	Baling བ་གླིང་	Baling
Langthil གླང་མཐིལ་	Baling བ་གླིང་	Pangzor
Langthil གླང་མཐིལ་	Jangbi བྱང་སྦིས་	Jangbee
Langthil གླང་མཐིལ་	Jangbi བྱང་སྦིས་	Phuzor Phumzor
Langthil གླང་མཐིལ་	Jangbi བྱང་སྦིས་	Wangling
Langthil གླང་མཐིལ་	Yuendroongchhoeling གཡུ་དྲུང་ཆོས་གླིང་	Beyling
Langthil གླང་མཐིལ་	Yuendroongchhoeling གཡུ་དྲུང་ཆོས་གླིང་	Yuling (Langthil)
Nubi ནུ་སྦིས་	Gagar Karzhong དགའ་སྒར་_དཀར་ཞོང་	Gagar
Nubi ནུ་སྦིས་	Gagar Karzhong དགའ་སྒར་_དཀར་ཞོང་	Jongthang
Nubi ནུ་སྦིས་	Gagar Karzhong དགའ་སྒར་_དཀར་ཞོང་	Karzhong
Nubi ནུ་སྦིས་	Darbab Sinphoog དར་བབ་_སྲིན་ཕུག་	Darbab
Nubi ནུ་སྦིས་	Darbab Sinphoog དར་བབ་_སྲིན་ཕུག་	Sinphoog
Nubi ནུ་སྦིས་	Darbab Sinphoog དར་བབ་_སྲིན་ཕུག་	Thang Ngyel
Nubi ནུ་སྦིས་	Bemji Chela བོན་སྦྱིས་_སྤྱེལ་	Bemjee
Nubi ནུ་སྦིས་	Bemji Chela བོན་སྦྱིས་_སྤྱེལ་	Kabab
Nubi ནུ་སྦིས་	Bemji Chela བོན་སྦྱིས་_སྤྱེལ་	Pang
Nubi ནུ་སྦིས་	Bemji Chela བོན་སྦྱིས་_སྤྱེལ་	Chela
Nubi ནུ་སྦིས་	Bji Saengbji སྦྱིས་_གསེངམ་སྦྱིས་	Dangzhing
Nubi ནུ་སྦིས་	Bji Saengbji སྦྱིས་_གསེངམ་སྦྱིས་	Bji
Nubi ནུ་སྦིས་	Bji Saengbji སྦྱིས་_གསེངམ་སྦྱིས་	Bji Pam
Nubi ནུ་སྦིས་	Bji Saengbji སྦྱིས་_གསེངམ་སྦྱིས་	Sengm-Bji
Nubi ནུ་སྦིས་	Bagochen Boolingpang Ueling བགོ་ཅན་_བུ་ལིང་སྤང་_ཨུ་གླིང་	Dorgen
Tangsibji སྟང་སི་སྦྱིས་	Chendenbji སྤྱན་ལྡན་སྦྱིས་	Chendenbji
Tangsibji སྟང་སི་སྦྱིས་	Nyala Drangla ཉ་ལ་བྲང་ལ་	Nyala Goenpa
Tangsibji སྟང་སི་སྦྱིས་	Nyala Drangla ཉ་ལ་བྲང་ལ་	Drangla Goenpa
Tangsibji སྟང་སི་སྦྱིས་	Tangsbji སྟང་ས་སྦྱིས་	Tangsibji
Tangsibji སྟང་སི་སྦྱིས་	Tshangkha ཚང་ཁ་	Tshangkha
Tangsibji སྟང་སི་སྦྱིས་	Kela ཀེ་ལ་	Kaladrame
Tangsibji སྟང་སི་སྦྱིས་	Kela ཀེ་ལ་	Kalathrelme

=== Tsirang District ===
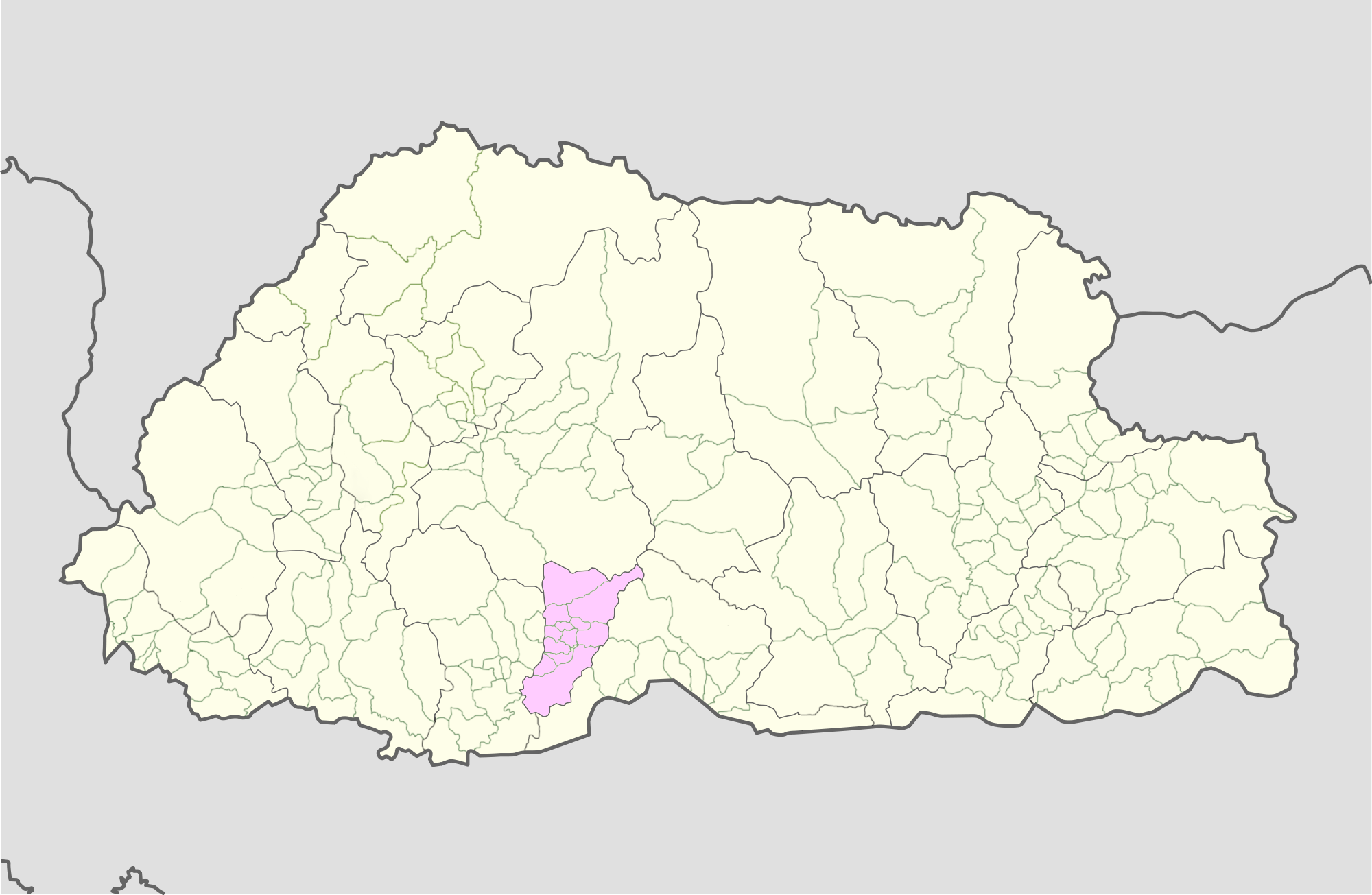
Tsirang District

Gewog	Chiwog	Village
Barshong བར་གཤོང་	Barshong Maed བར་གཤོང་སྨད་	Barshong Maed (Gairigang Ka)
Barshong བར་གཤོང་	Barshong Toed བར་གཤོང་སྟོད་	Barshong Toed (Gairigang Ka)
Barshong བར་གཤོང་	Chunyikhang བཅུ་གཉིས་ཁང་	Chunyikhang (Baradhurey)
Barshong བར་གཤོང་	Gangtogkha སྒང་ཏོག་ཁ་	Gangtokha (Daragang)
Barshong བར་གཤོང་	Toedsang སྟོད་སངས་	Gairigang Kha (Gairigaon B)
Barshong བར་གཤོང་	Toedsang སྟོད་སངས་	Toitshang
Dunglagang དུང་ལ་སྒང་	Norjangsa ནོར་བྱང་ས་	Norjangsa (Lalikharka)
Dunglagang དུང་ལ་སྒང་	Dingrigang Lhamoiloongm ལྡིང་རི་སྒང་_ལྷ་མོའི་ལུངམ་	Lhamoiloongm (Gopini)
Dunglagang དུང་ལ་སྒང་	Khirithang ཁྱི་རི་ཐང་	Khirithang (Khorsaney)
Dunglagang དུང་ལ་སྒང་	Dangreyboog Maed དྭངས་རས་སྦུག་སྨད་	Dangrayboog Maed (Bichgaon Kha)
Dunglagang དུང་ལ་སྒང་	Dangreyboog Toed དྭངས་རས་སྦུག་སྟོད་	Dangrayboog Toed (Bichgaon Ka)
Gosarling སྒོ་གསར་གླིང་	Phuensoomgang ཕུན་སུམ་སྒང་	Phuensoomgang (Gairigaon A)
Gosarling སྒོ་གསར་གླིང་	Phuensoomgang ཕུན་སུམ་སྒང་	Chokpur
Gosarling སྒོ་གསར་གླིང་	Dzamlingzor འཛམ་གླིང་ཟོར་	Dzamling Zor (Upper Suntolay)
Gosarling སྒོ་གསར་གླིང་	Pemathang པདྨ་ཐང་	Pemathang (Lower Suntolay)
Gosarling སྒོ་གསར་གླིང་	Pelrithang དཔལ་རི་ཐང་	Pelrithang (Upper Lobsibotay)
Gosarling སྒོ་གསར་གླིང་	Dzamlingthang འཛམ་གླིང་ཐང་	Dzamlingthang (Lower Lobsibotay)
Kilkhorthang དཀྱིལ་འཁོར་ཐང་	Tashiyangjong བཀྲིས་གཡང་ལྗོངས་	Tashiyangjong (Lower Salami)
Kilkhorthang དཀྱིལ་འཁོར་ཐང་	Nyizergang ཉི་ཟེར་སྒང་	Nyizergang (Upper Salami)
Kilkhorthang དཀྱིལ་འཁོར་ཐང་	Satsangma ས་གཙང་མ་	Sa-Tsangma (Majuwa)
Kilkhorthang དཀྱིལ་འཁོར་ཐང་	Dekidling བདེ་སྐྱིད་གླིང་	Dekidling (Lower Bockray)
Kilkhorthang དཀྱིལ་འཁོར་ཐང་	Maenchhana མན་ཆ་ན་	Maenchhana (Mithun)
Mendrelgang མནྜལ་སྒང་	Mendrelgang མནྜལ་སྒང་	Mendrelgang (Lamidara)
Mendrelgang མནྜལ་སྒང་	Dzamlingzor འཛམ་གླིན་ཟོར་	Dzamling Zor (Majigaon)
Mendrelgang མནྜལ་སྒང་	Dzamlingzor འཛམ་གླིན་ཟོར་	Dzamling Zor (Manikhola)
Mendrelgang མནྜལ་སྒང་	Dzamlingzor འཛམ་གླིན་ཟོར་	Dzamling Zor (Sarkigaon)
Mendrelgang མནྜལ་སྒང་	Pemashong Samshinggaden པདྨ་ཤོང་_བསམ་ཤིང་དགའ་ལྡན་	Pemashong (Sarkigaon)
Mendrelgang མནྜལ་སྒང་	Pemashong Samshinggaden པདྨ་ཤོང་_བསམ་ཤིང་དགའ་ལྡན་	Shamshing Gaden (Manidara)
Mendrelgang མནྜལ་སྒང་	Tashipang བཀྲིས་སྤང་	Tashipang (Gurungaon)
Mendrelgang མནྜལ་སྒང་	Riserboo རི་གསེར་བུ་	Riserboo (Rateykhola)
Mendrelgang མནྜལ་སྒང་	Riserboo རི་གསེར་བུ་	Riserboo A (Kamigaon)
Mendrelgang མནྜལ་སྒང་	Riserboo རི་གསེར་བུ་	Riserboo B (Kamigaon)
Patshaling པ་ཚ་གླིང་	Pantshaling Toed སྤ་ཚ་གླིང་སྟོད་	Patsaling Toed
Patshaling པ་ཚ་གླིང་	Pantshaling Maed Tsakaling སྤ་ཚ་གླིང་སྨད་_རྩ་ཀ་གླིང་	Patshaling Maed
Patshaling པ་ཚ་གླིང་	Pantshaling Maed Tsakaling སྤ་ཚ་གླིང་སྨད་_རྩ་ཀ་གླིང་	Tsakaling (Kalay Kalikhola)
Patshaling པ་ཚ་གླིང་	Thakorling མཐའ་སྐོར་གླིང་	Thakorling (Thangray)
Patshaling པ་ཚ་གླིང་	Chhuzomsa ཆུ་འཛོམས་སའ་	Chhuzomsa (Bulkay)
Patshaling པ་ཚ་གླིང་	Pangthang སྤང་ཐང་	Pangthang (Pakhay)
Patshaling པ་ཚ་གླིང་	Pangthang སྤང་ཐང་	Munyulsa (Kaligaon)
Patshaling པ་ཚ་གླིང་	Pangthang སྤང་ཐང་	Jakhor (Dhanisay)
Phuntenchhu སྤུང་རྟེན་ཆུ་	Serzhong གསེར་གཞོང་	Serzhong (Phaleday)
Phuntenchhu སྤུང་རྟེན་ཆུ་	Serzhong གསེར་གཞོང་	Menchhunang (Kharkhola)
Phuntenchhu སྤུང་རྟེན་ཆུ་	Norboothang ནོར་བུ་ཐང་	Norbuthang (Manitar)
Phuntenchhu སྤུང་རྟེན་ཆུ་	Norboothang ནོར་བུ་ཐང་	Dongtod (Saureni)
Phuntenchhu སྤུང་རྟེན་ཆུ་	Tashichhoeling བཀྲིས་ཆོས་གླིང་	Tashichholing (Burichu)
Phuntenchhu སྤུང་རྟེན་ཆུ་	Peljorling དཔལ་འབྱོར་གླིང་	Peljorling (Dhansiri)
Phuntenchhu སྤུང་རྟེན་ཆུ་	Peljorling དཔལ་འབྱོར་གླིང་	Wangthangling (Jogitar)
Phuntenchhu སྤུང་རྟེན་ཆུ་	Peljorling དཔལ་འབྱོར་གླིང་	Chhubapsa (Tshangay)
Phuntenchhu སྤུང་རྟེན་ཆུ་	Goentegkha Tongshinggang དགོམ་སྟེགས་ཁ་_སྟོང་ཤིང་སྒང་	Dragithong (S/Melay)
Phuntenchhu སྤུང་རྟེན་ཆུ་	Goentegkha Tongshinggang དགོམ་སྟེགས་ཁ་_སྟོང་ཤིང་སྒང་	Goentengkha (Baithakey)
Phuntenchhu སྤུང་རྟེན་ཆུ་	Goentegkha Tongshinggang དགོམ་སྟེགས་ཁ་_སྟོང་ཤིང་སྒང་	Dhodomchen (Dhapkhola)
Phuntenchhu སྤུང་རྟེན་ཆུ་	Goentegkha Tongshinggang དགོམ་སྟེགས་ཁ་_སྟོང་ཤིང་སྒང་	Tongshigang (T/Melay)
Rangthangling རང་ཐང་གླིང་	Chringma Rangthangling སྐྱ་རིང་མ་_རང་ཐང་གླིང་	Charingma (Zulphaygaon)
Rangthangling རང་ཐང་གླིང་	Chringma Rangthangling སྐྱ་རིང་མ་_རང་ཐང་གླིང་	Rangthangling (Chanautre)
Rangthangling རང་ཐང་གླིང་	Neymedsa ནད་མེད་ས་	Neymedsa (Nevarey)
Rangthangling རང་ཐང་གླིང་	Darchhargang དར་འཕྱར་སྒང་	Darchhargang (Dhajey)
Rangthangling རང་ཐང་གླིང་	Gagaling Nyimazor དགའ་དགའ་གླིང་_ཉི་མ་ཟོར་	Gagaling (Ghaga Goan)
Rangthangling རང་ཐང་གླིང་	Gagaling Nyimazor དགའ་དགའ་གླིང་_ཉི་མ་ཟོར་	Nyimazor (Herabotay)
Rangthangling རང་ཐང་གླིང་	Gagaling Nyimazor དགའ་དགའ་གླིང་_ཉི་མ་ཟོར་	Rangthangling (Chanautre)
Rangthangling རང་ཐང་གླིང་	Soonkosh སུན་ཀོཤ་	Soonkosh
Rangthangling རང་ཐང་གླིང་	Soonkosh སུན་ཀོཤ་	Dawthongsa (Saunay)
Semjong སེམས་ལྗོངས་	Dekidling བདེ་སྐྱིད་གླིང་	Dekidling (Kokray)
Semjong སེམས་ལྗོངས་	Dangreygang དྭངས་རས་སྒང་	Dangreygang (Daragaon)
Semjong སེམས་ལྗོངས་	Dzomling འཛོམས་གླིང་	Dzomling (Katikey)
Semjong སེམས་ལྗོངས་	Tashiling Maed བཀྲ་ཤིས་གླིང་སྨད་	Tashiling Maed (Bararay A)
Semjong སེམས་ལྗོངས་	Tashiling Toed བཀྲིས་ཤིས་གླིང་སྟོད་	Tashiling Toed (Bararay B)
Sergithang གསེར་གྱི་ཐང་	Sergithang Toed གསེར་གྱི་ཐང་སྟོད་	Sergithang Toed (Upper Sergithang)
Sergithang གསེར་གྱི་ཐང་	Sergithang Maed གསེར་གྷྱི་ཐང་སྨད་	Sergithang Maed (Lower Sergithang)
Sergithang གསེར་གྱི་ཐང་	Norboogang ནོར་བུ་སྒང་	Norboogang (Mazgaon)
Sergithang གསེར་གྱི་ཐང་	Tashithang བཀྲིས་ཐང་	Tashithang (Patale Tar)
Sergithang གསེར་གྱི་ཐང་	Semdenjong སེམས་ལྡན་ལྗོངས་	Semdenjong (Teoray)
Tsholingkhar མཚོ་གླིང་མཁར་	Tsholingkhar Maed མཚོ་གླིང་ཁར་སྟོད་	Tsholingkhar Maed (Lower Tshokana)
Tsholingkhar མཚོ་གླིང་མཁར་	Tsholingkhar Toed མཚོ་གླིང་ཁར་སྟོད་	Tsholingkar Toed (Upper Tshokana)
Tsholingkhar མཚོ་གླིང་མཁར་	Droobchhugang ཁྲུབ་ཆུ་སྒང་	Alenchi (Alaichey)
Tsholingkhar མཚོ་གླིང་མཁར་	Droobchhugang ཁྲུབ་ཆུ་སྒང་	Droobchhugang (Harpaypani)
Tsholingkhar མཚོ་གླིང་མཁར་	Kapazhing ཀ་པ་ཞིང་	Tsholingkhar (Kapazhing)
Tsholingkhar མཚོ་གླིང་མཁར་	Gomsoom སྒོམ་གསུམ་	Gomsoom (Tintalay)
Tsirang Toed རྩི་རང་སྟོད་	Tsirang Toed ཙི་རང་སྟོད་	Tsirang Toed
Tsirang Toed རྩི་རང་སྟོད་	Tsirang Toed ཙི་རང་སྟོད་	Zomna (Jingay)
Tsirang Toed རྩི་རང་སྟོད་	Kabelzhing ཀ་བལ་ཞིང་	Kabelzhing (Tsheringtoe)
Tsirang Toed རྩི་རང་སྟོད་	Tongshingnang སྟོང་ཤིང་ནང་	Tongshingnang (Salleri)
Tsirang Toed རྩི་རང་སྟོད་	Soentabsa སོན་བཏབ་ས་	Doongkarling (Bouri)
Tsirang Toed རྩི་རང་སྟོད་	Soentabsa སོན་བཏབ་ས་	Damtshang
Tsirang Toed རྩི་རང་སྟོད་	Soentabsa སོན་བཏབ་ས་	Soentabsa (Dalleni)
Tsirang Toed རྩི་རང་སྟོད་	Tagthang Wangphoo སྟག་ཐང་_ཝང་ཕུ་	Wangphoo (Dauthrey)
Tsirang Toed རྩི་རང་སྟོད་	Tagthang Wangphoo སྟག་ཐང་_ཝང་ཕུ་	Chhuboelsa (Simpani)
Tsirang Toed རྩི་རང་སྟོད་	Tagthang Wangphoo སྟག་ཐང་_ཝང་ཕུ་	Tagthang (Bhaktar)

=== Wangdue Phodrang District ===
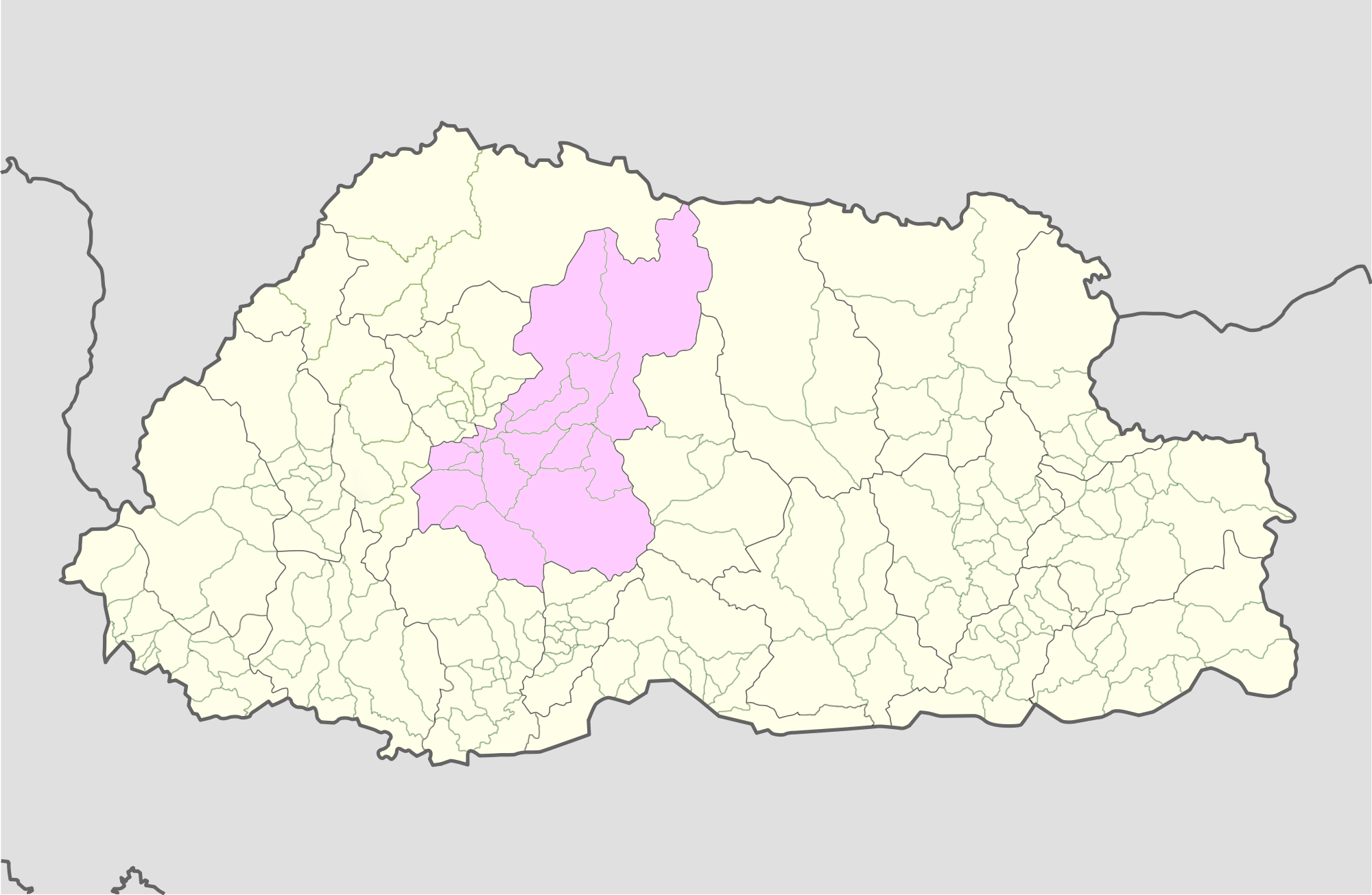
Wangdue Phodrang District

Gewog	Chiwog	Village
Athang ཨ་ཐང་	Lomtshokha ལོམ་ཚོ་ཁ་	Lomtshokha
Athang ཨ་ཐང་	Lomtshokha ལོམ་ཚོ་ཁ་	Kago
Athang ཨ་ཐང་	Jaroggang Dzawa བྱ་རོགས་སྒང་_རྫ་བ་	Jarog-gang
Athang ཨ་ཐང་	Jaroggang Dzawa བྱ་རོགས་སྒང་_རྫ་བ་	Dzawa
Athang ཨ་ཐང་	Lophokha Pagtakha ལོ་པོ་ཁ་_ཕག་ཏ་ཁ་	Lophokha
Athang ཨ་ཐང་	Lophokha Pagtakha ལོ་པོ་ཁ་_ཕག་ཏ་ཁ་	Phagtakha
Athang ཨ་ཐང་	Rookha རུ་ཁ་	Nangzhina
Athang ཨ་ཐང་	Rookha རུ་ཁ་	Samthang
Athang ཨ་ཐང་	Rookha རུ་ཁ་	Rockha
Athang ཨ་ཐང་	Rookha རུ་ཁ་	Haragangkha
Athang ཨ་ཐང་	Lawa Lamga ལ་ཝ་_ལམ་ག་	Lamga
Athang ཨ་ཐང་	Lawa Lamga ལ་ཝ་_ལམ་ག་	Lawa
Bjendag སྦྱེད་ནག་	Bjednagloongpa Thingmakha སྦྱེད་ནག་ལུང་པ་_མཐིང་མ་ཁ་	Balakha
Bjendag སྦྱེད་ནག་	Bjednagloongpa Thingmakha སྦྱེད་ནག་ལུང་པ་_མཐིང་མ་ཁ་	Bjednagloongpa
Bjendag སྦྱེད་ནག་	Bjednagloongpa Thingmakha སྦྱེད་ནག་ལུང་པ་_མཐིང་མ་ཁ་	Dekiling
Bjendag སྦྱེད་ནག་	Bjednagloongpa Thingmakha སྦྱེད་ནག་ལུང་པ་_མཐིང་མ་ཁ་	Lamdogkha
Bjendag སྦྱེད་ནག་	Bjednagloongpa Thingmakha སྦྱེད་ནག་ལུང་པ་_མཐིང་མ་ཁ་	Pangmarchu
Bjendag སྦྱེད་ནག་	Bjednagloongpa Thingmakha སྦྱེད་ནག་ལུང་པ་_མཐིང་མ་ཁ་	Shokeylog
Bjendag སྦྱེད་ནག་	Bjednagloongpa Thingmakha སྦྱེད་ནག་ལུང་པ་_མཐིང་མ་ཁ་	Gongthangkha
Bjendag སྦྱེད་ནག་	Bjednagloongpa Thingmakha སྦྱེད་ནག་ལུང་པ་_མཐིང་མ་ཁ་	Lamikhar
Bjendag སྦྱེད་ནག་	Bjednagloongpa Thingmakha སྦྱེད་ནག་ལུང་པ་_མཐིང་མ་ཁ་	Thingmakha
Bjendag སྦྱེད་ནག་	Tashitokha བཀྲ་ཤིས་ལྟོ་ཁ་	Darjeegang
Bjendag སྦྱེད་ནག་	Tashitokha བཀྲ་ཤིས་ལྟོ་ཁ་	Rinchhenling
Bjendag སྦྱེད་ནག་	Tashitokha བཀྲ་ཤིས་ལྟོ་ཁ་	Phuentshoggang
Bjendag སྦྱེད་ནག་	Tashitokha བཀྲ་ཤིས་ལྟོ་ཁ་	Tashi Tokha
Bjendag སྦྱེད་ནག་	Tashitokha བཀྲ་ཤིས་ལྟོ་ཁ་	Toedkikhar
Bjendag སྦྱེད་ནག་	Tashitokha བཀྲ་ཤིས་ལྟོ་ཁ་	Eusakha
Bjendag སྦྱེད་ནག་	Tashitokha བཀྲ་ཤིས་ལྟོ་ཁ་	Tashi Lakha
Bjendag སྦྱེད་ནག་	Tashitokha བཀྲ་ཤིས་ལྟོ་ཁ་	Gonaloo
Bjendag སྦྱེད་ནག་	Tashitokha བཀྲ་ཤིས་ལྟོ་ཁ་	Zangtegkha
Bjendag སྦྱེད་ནག་	Wachhey ཝ་ཆས་	Jazhikha
Bjendag སྦྱེད་ནག་	Wachhey ཝ་ཆས་	Damzhingkhar
Bjendag སྦྱེད་ནག་	Wachhey ཝ་ཆས་	Dongchen
Bjendag སྦྱེད་ནག་	Wachhey ཝ་ཆས་	Geyten
Bjendag སྦྱེད་ནག་	Wachhey ཝ་ཆས་	Gholaykhar
Bjendag སྦྱེད་ནག་	Wachhey ཝ་ཆས་	Goomina
Bjendag སྦྱེད་ནག་	Wachhey ཝ་ཆས་	Loongmo
Bjendag སྦྱེད་ནག་	Wachhey ཝ་ཆས་	Pelchhu
Bjendag སྦྱེད་ནག་	Wachhey ཝ་ཆས་	Phagpchhusa
Bjendag སྦྱེད་ནག་	Wachhey ཝ་ཆས་	Takarkhar
Bjendag སྦྱེད་ནག་	Wachhey ཝ་ཆས་	Tarrog
Bjendag སྦྱེད་ནག་	Wachhey ཝ་ཆས་	Toedkikhar
Bjendag སྦྱེད་ནག་	Wachhey ཝ་ཆས་	Toekizingkha
Bjendag སྦྱེད་ནག་	Wachhey ཝ་ཆས་	Wachhey
Bjendag སྦྱེད་ནག་	Wachhey ཝ་ཆས་	Euchhu
Bjendag སྦྱེད་ནག་	Wachhey ཝ་ཆས་	Kokojoog
Bjendag སྦྱེད་ནག་	Wachhey ཝ་ཆས་	Kokokhar
Bjendag སྦྱེད་ནག་	Wachhey ཝ་ཆས་	Loongpa
Bjendag སྦྱེད་ནག་	Wachhey ཝ་ཆས་	Loongphugang
Bjendag སྦྱེད་ནག་	Wachhey ཝ་ཆས་	Pangmarkhar
Bjendag སྦྱེད་ནག་	Wachhey ཝ་ཆས་	Pangmarpo
Bjendag སྦྱེད་ནག་	Wachhey ཝ་ཆས་	Sershongnang
Bjendag སྦྱེད་ནག་	Wachhey ཝ་ཆས་	Sisidarkar
Bjendag སྦྱེད་ནག་	Wachhey ཝ་ཆས་	Shongchuna
Bjendag སྦྱེད་ནག་	Wachhey ཝ་ཆས་	Shongtoedkhar
Bjendag སྦྱེད་ནག་	Wachhey ཝ་ཆས་	Tarshingtsawa
Bjendag སྦྱེད་ནག་	Wachhey ཝ་ཆས་	Tshangchhekhar
Bjendag སྦྱེད་ནག་	Wachhey ཝ་ཆས་	Tshigkona
Bjendag སྦྱེད་ནག་	Wachhey ཝ་ཆས་	Gangmarkhar
Bjendag སྦྱེད་ནག་	Wachhey ཝ་ཆས་	Jangsergang
Bjendag སྦྱེད་ནག་	Wachhey ཝ་ཆས་	Khametey
Bjendag སྦྱེད་ནག་	Wachhey ཝ་ཆས་	Khatangkhar
Bjendag སྦྱེད་ནག་	Garzhikha Omchheygang སྒར་གཞི་ཁ་_ཨོམ་ཆེ་སྒང་	Garzhikha
Bjendag སྦྱེད་ནག་	Garzhikha Omchheygang སྒར་གཞི་ཁ་_ཨོམ་ཆེ་སྒང་	Jaubamo
Bjendag སྦྱེད་ནག་	Garzhikha Omchheygang སྒར་གཞི་ཁ་_ཨོམ་ཆེ་སྒང་	Lhakhangchen
Bjendag སྦྱེད་ནག་	Garzhikha Omchheygang སྒར་གཞི་ཁ་_ཨོམ་ཆེ་སྒང་	Namgyalling
Bjendag སྦྱེད་ནག་	Garzhikha Omchheygang སྒར་གཞི་ཁ་_ཨོམ་ཆེ་སྒང་	Omchheygang
Bjendag སྦྱེད་ནག་	Ngawang Tongchennang ངག་དབང་_སྟོང་ཅན་ནང་	Okorzhing
Bjendag སྦྱེད་ནག་	Ngawang Tongchennang ངག་དབང་_སྟོང་ཅན་ནང་	Sarchhu
Bjendag སྦྱེད་ནག་	Ngawang Tongchennang ངག་དབང་_སྟོང་ཅན་ནང་	Bakakha
Bjendag སྦྱེད་ནག་	Ngawang Tongchennang ངག་དབང་_སྟོང་ཅན་ནང་	Jagarlingchu
Bjendag སྦྱེད་ནག་	Ngawang Tongchennang ངག་དབང་_སྟོང་ཅན་ནང་	Kaangtegtewa
Bjendag སྦྱེད་ནག་	Ngawang Tongchennang ངག་དབང་_སྟོང་ཅན་ནང་	Kelakha
Bjendag སྦྱེད་ནག་	Ngawang Tongchennang ངག་དབང་_སྟོང་ཅན་ནང་	Nyalagang
Bjendag སྦྱེད་ནག་	Ngawang Tongchennang ངག་དབང་_སྟོང་ཅན་ནང་	Ngawang
Bjendag སྦྱེད་ནག་	Ngawang Tongchennang ངག་དབང་_སྟོང་ཅན་ནང་	Omkhag
Bjendag སྦྱེད་ནག་	Ngawang Tongchennang ངག་དབང་_སྟོང་ཅན་ནང་	Togchennang
Bjendag སྦྱེད་ནག་	Ngawang Tongchennang ངག་དབང་_སྟོང་ཅན་ནང་	Tshering Pangchu
Bjendag སྦྱེད་ནག་	Ngawang Tongchennang ངག་དབང་_སྟོང་ཅན་ནང་	Wakha
Bjendag སྦྱེད་ནག་	Ngawang Tongchennang ངག་དབང་_སྟོང་ཅན་ནང་	Gangchukhar
Darkar དར་དཀར་	Uma Khatoed ཨུ་མ་ཁ་སྟོད་	Uma Khatoed
Darkar དར་དཀར་	Kamichhu Uma Khamaed ཀ་མི་ཆུ་_ཨུ་མ་ཁ་སྨད་	Uma Khamaed
Darkar དར་དཀར་	Kamina Wogyal ཀ་མི་ན་_འོ་བརྒྱལ་	Kamina
Darkar དར་དཀར་	Kamina Wogyal ཀ་མི་ན་_འོ་བརྒྱལ་	Wogyal
Darkar དར་དཀར་	Gyapakha རྒྱས་པ་ཁ་	Gyapakha
Darkar དར་དཀར་	Sili Taagsha སི་ལི་_སྟག་ཤ་	Sili
Darkar དར་དཀར་	Sili Taagsha སི་ལི་_སྟག་ཤ་	Taagsha
Darkar དར་དཀར་	Sili Taagsha སི་ལི་_སྟག་ཤ་	Tsara
Dangchu དྭངས་ཆུ་	Godraang Taagsar གོ་བྲང་_སྟག་གསར་	Taagsar
Dangchu དྭངས་ཆུ་	Godraang Taagsar གོ་བྲང་_སྟག་གསར་	Godraang
Dangchu དྭངས་ཆུ་	Godraang Taagsar གོ་བྲང་_སྟག་གསར་	Loomjoog
Dangchu དྭངས་ཆུ་	Godraang Taagsar གོ་བྲང་_སྟག་གསར་	Drongmeed
Dangchu དྭངས་ཆུ་	Tokaling Tomla ལྟོ་ཀ་གླིང་_སྟོམ་ལ་	Tomla
Dangchu དྭངས་ཆུ་	Tokaling Tomla ལྟོ་ཀ་གླིང་_སྟོམ་ལ་	Tokaling
Dangchu དྭངས་ཆུ་	Tokaling Tomla ལྟོ་ཀ་གླིང་_སྟོམ་ལ་	Gempang
Dangchu དྭངས་ཆུ་	Tashidingkha Zimi བཀྲིས་ལྡིང་ཁ་_ཟི་མི་	Bamed
Dangchu དྭངས་ཆུ་	Tashidingkha Zimi བཀྲིས་ལྡིང་ཁ་_ཟི་མི་	Chhubarwog
Dangchu དྭངས་ཆུ་	Tashidingkha Zimi བཀྲིས་ལྡིང་ཁ་_ཟི་མི་	Chhubar Taagm
Dangchu དྭངས་ཆུ་	Tashidingkha Zimi བཀྲིས་ལྡིང་ཁ་_ཟི་མི་	Dogsena
Dangchu དྭངས་ཆུ་	Tashidingkha Zimi བཀྲིས་ལྡིང་ཁ་_ཟི་མི་	Zimi
Dangchu དྭངས་ཆུ་	Tashidingkha Zimi བཀྲིས་ལྡིང་ཁ་_ཟི་མི་	Doenchhoeling
Dangchu དྭངས་ཆུ་	Tashidingkha Zimi བཀྲིས་ལྡིང་ཁ་_ཟི་མི་	Selgona
Dangchu དྭངས་ཆུ་	Tashidingkha Zimi བཀྲིས་ལྡིང་ཁ་_ཟི་མི་	Tashidingkha
Dangchu དྭངས་ཆུ་	Tashidingkha Zimi བཀྲིས་ལྡིང་ཁ་_ཟི་མི་	Phuentshoggang
Dangchu དྭངས་ཆུ་	Tashidingkha Zimi བཀྲིས་ལྡིང་ཁ་_ཟི་མི་	Tashigang
Dangchu དྭངས་ཆུ་	Uesagang གཨུས་ས་སྒང་	Uesagang
Dangchu དྭངས་ཆུ་	Uesagang གཨུས་ས་སྒང་	Gedra Goenpa
Dangchu དྭངས་ཆུ་	Uesagang གཨུས་ས་སྒང་	Phaljorling
Dangchu དྭངས་ཆུ་	Doongdoongnyelsa Norbooding དུང་དུང་ཉལ་ས་_ནོར་བུ་ལྡིང་	Norbooding
Dangchu དྭངས་ཆུ་	Doongdoongnyelsa Norbooding དུང་དུང་ཉལ་ས་_ནོར་བུ་ལྡིང་	Rigoen
Dangchu དྭངས་ཆུ་	Doongdoongnyelsa Norbooding དུང་དུང་ཉལ་ས་_ནོར་བུ་ལྡིང་	Ridag Goenpa
Dangchu དྭངས་ཆུ་	Doongdoongnyelsa Norbooding དུང་དུང་ཉལ་ས་_ནོར་བུ་ལྡིང་	Rithangwog
Gangteng སྒང་སྟེང་	Jangchen Koomboo བྱང་ཅན་_ཀུམ་བུ་	Jangchen
Gangteng སྒང་སྟེང་	Jangchen Koomboo བྱང་ཅན་_ཀུམ་བུ་	Koomboo
Gangteng སྒང་སྟེང་	Gangteng སྒང་སྟེང་	Gangteng
Gangteng སྒང་སྟེང་	Gangteng སྒང་སྟེང་	Geyla
Gangteng སྒང་སྟེང་	Yaekorwog གཡས་བསྐོར་འོག་	Maang
Gangteng སྒང་སྟེང་	Yaekorwog གཡས་བསྐོར་འོག་	Saangtana
Gangteng སྒང་སྟེང་	Tapaiteng Uega རྟ་མའི་སྟེང་_གཡུལ་ག་	Gangteng Tapaiteng
Gangteng སྒང་སྟེང་	Tapaiteng Uega རྟ་མའི་སྟེང་_གཡུལ་ག་	Uesa
Gangteng སྒང་སྟེང་	Gorgoen སྒོར་དགོན་	Gorgoen
Gasetsho Gom དགའ་སེང་ཚོ་གོངམ་	Changche Matshigpogto ལྕང་ཅེ་_མ་འཚིག་སྤོག་ཏོ་	Gangche
Gasetsho Gom དགའ་སེང་ཚོ་གོངམ་	Changche Matshigpogto ལྕང་ཅེ་_མ་འཚིག་སྤོག་ཏོ་	Matshigpogto
Gasetsho Gom དགའ་སེང་ཚོ་གོངམ་	Khamaedna ཁ་སྨད་ན་	Khamaedna
Gasetsho Gom དགའ་སེང་ཚོ་གོངམ་	Khamaedna ཁ་སྨད་ན་	Tongzhong
Gasetsho Gom དགའ་སེང་ཚོ་གོངམ་	Khatoedkha ཁ་སྟོད་ཁ་	Khatoedkha
Gasetsho Gom དགའ་སེང་ཚོ་གོངམ་	Khatoedkha ཁ་སྟོད་ཁ་	Thoukha
Gasetsho Gom དགའ་སེང་ཚོ་གོངམ་	Changkha ལྕང་ཁ་	Changkha
Gasetsho Gom དགའ་སེང་ཚོ་གོངམ་	Changkha ལྕང་ཁ་	Pasakha
Gasetsho Gom དགའ་སེང་ཚོ་གོངམ་	Changkha ལྕང་ཁ་	Ternga
Gasetsho Gom དགའ་སེང་ཚོ་གོངམ་	Dabchhaykha Matshigkha གྲབ་ཅས་ཁ་_མ་འཚིག་ཁ་	Dabchheykha
Gasetsho Gom དགའ་སེང་ཚོ་གོངམ་	Dabchhaykha Matshigkha གྲབ་ཅས་ཁ་_མ་འཚིག་ཁ་	Matshig Kha
Gasetsho Wom དགའ་སེང་ཆོ་འོགམ་	Shingkhey Khatoed ཤིང་འཁོད་_ཁ་སྟོད་	Shingkhey
Gasetsho Wom དགའ་སེང་ཆོ་འོགམ་	Singkhey Khamaed ཤིང་འགོད་_ཁ་སྨད་	Shingkhey
Gasetsho Wom དགའ་སེང་ཆོ་འོགམ་	Medpaisa Taabchhaekha མེད་པའི་ས་_བཏབ་ཆས་ཁ་	Tabcheykha
Gasetsho Wom དགའ་སེང་ཆོ་འོགམ་	Medpaisa Taabchhaekha མེད་པའི་ས་_བཏབ་ཆས་ཁ་	Medpaisa
Gasetsho Wom དགའ་སེང་ཆོ་འོགམ་	Medpaisa Taabchhaekha མེད་པའི་ས་_བཏབ་ཆས་ཁ་	Gikha
Gasetsho Wom དགའ་སེང་ཆོ་འོགམ་	Haetshokha ཧས་ཆོ་ཁ་	Haetshokha
Gasetsho Wom དགའ་སེང་ཆོ་འོགམ་	Haebisa ཧས་སྦིས་ས་	Haebisa
Kazhi ཀ་གཞི་	Baedrog སྦས་འབྲོག་	Baedrog
Kazhi ཀ་གཞི་	Lengbi ལེང་སྦིས་	Lengbi
Kazhi ཀ་གཞི་	Lengbi ལེང་སྦིས་	Baelpa
Kazhi ཀ་གཞི་	Komathrang ཀོ་མ་ཕྲང་	Komathrang
Kazhi ཀ་གཞི་	Kazhi ཀ་གཞི་	Kazhi
Kazhi ཀ་གཞི་	Kazhi ཀ་གཞི་	Lumchey
Kazhi ཀ་གཞི་	Chegidp ཅེ་དགྱིདཔ་	Chegidp
Kazhi ཀ་གཞི་	Chegidp ཅེ་དགྱིདཔ་	Goendep
Nahi ན་ཧི་	Nagbisa ནག་སྦིས་ས་	Nagbisa
Nahi ན་ཧི་	Uesagongm Thabji གཡུས་ས་གོངམ་_ཐབ་སྦྱིས་	Eusa Gongm
Nahi ན་ཧི་	Haebisa ཧས་སྦིས་ས་	Haebisa
Nahi ན་ཧི་	Khoorjoongla Langmizi ཁུར་འབྱུང་ལ་_བླང་མི་ཟི་	Khoorjoongla
Nahi ན་ཧི་	Halued Uesawogm ཧ་ལུད་_གཡུས་ས་འོགམ་	Eusa Wogm
Nahi ན་ཧི་	Halued Uesawogm ཧ་ལུད་_གཡུས་ས་འོགམ་	Halued
Nyisho ཉི་ཤོག་	Goensar Rajawog དགོན་གསར་_ར་ཛ་འོག་	Goensar
Nyisho ཉི་ཤོག་	Gangjab སྒང་རྒྱབ་	Gangjab
Nyisho ཉི་ཤོག་	Chitokha Pangkha སྤྱི་ཏོ་ཁ་_སྤང་ཁ་	Chitokha
Nyisho ཉི་ཤོག་	Chitokha Pangkha སྤྱི་ཏོ་ཁ་_སྤང་ཁ་	Pangkha
Nyisho ཉི་ཤོག་	Samtengang བསམ་གཏང་སྒང་	Nyishogkha
Nyisho ཉི་ཤོག་	Samtengang བསམ་གཏང་སྒང་	Chhedalog
Nyisho ཉི་ཤོག་	Samtengang བསམ་གཏང་སྒང་	Zampa
Nyisho ཉི་ཤོག་	Samtengang བསམ་གཏང་སྒང་	Pangzhikha
Nyisho ཉི་ཤོག་	Samtengang བསམ་གཏང་སྒང་	Samtengang
Nyisho ཉི་ཤོག་	Geylegkha Kuenzangling དགེ་ལེགས་ཁ་_ཀུན་བཟང་གླིང་	Geylegkha
Nyisho ཉི་ཤོག་	Geylegkha Kuenzangling དགེ་ལེགས་ཁ་_ཀུན་བཟང་གླིང་	Kuenzangling
Nyisho ཉི་ཤོག་	Chhaebhakha ཆས་བྷ་ཁ་	Chhaebhakha
Phangyul ཕངས་ཡུལ་	Uesargang Wampoekhar གཡུས་གསར་སྒང་_འམ་སྤོད་ཁ་	Wampoekhar
Phangyul ཕངས་ཡུལ་	Chhungserkha Domkha ཁྱུང་སེར་ཁ་_དོམ་ཁ་	Chhoongserkha
Phangyul ཕངས་ཡུལ་	Chhungserkha Domkha ཁྱུང་སེར་ཁ་_དོམ་ཁ་	Domkha
Phangyul ཕངས་ཡུལ་	Chhunggoen ཁྱུང་དགོན་	Chhung Goen
Phangyul ཕངས་ཡུལ་	Goenkhar དགོན་ཁར་	Goenkhar
Phangyul ཕངས་ཡུལ་	Koomchhi Phangyuel ཀུམ་ཆི་_ཕངས་ཡུལ་	Koomchhi
Phangyul ཕངས་ཡུལ་	Koomchhi Phangyuel ཀུམ་ཆི་_ཕངས་ཡུལ་	Phangyuel
Phobji ཕོབ་སྦྱིས་	Damchhoe Gangphel དམ་ཆོས་_སྒང་འཕེལ་	Damchoelhakhang
Phobji ཕོབ་སྦྱིས་	Damchhoe Gangphel དམ་ཆོས་_སྒང་འཕེལ་	Zhugar
Phobji ཕོབ་སྦྱིས་	Damchhoe Gangphel དམ་ཆོས་_སྒང་འཕེལ་	Gangphel
Phobji ཕོབ་སྦྱིས་	Damchhoe Gangphel དམ་ཆོས་_སྒང་འཕེལ་	Zhibar
Phobji ཕོབ་སྦྱིས་	Damchhoe Gangphel དམ་ཆོས་_སྒང་འཕེལ་	Zigzi
Phobji ཕོབ་སྦྱིས་	Dogsenang Gorphoog དོགས་སེ་ནང་_སྒོར་ཕུག་	Chumedchen
Phobji ཕོབ་སྦྱིས་	Dogsenang Gorphoog དོགས་སེ་ནང་_སྒོར་ཕུག་	Dasangsar
Phobji ཕོབ་སྦྱིས་	Dogsenang Gorphoog དོགས་སེ་ནང་_སྒོར་ཕུག་	Dogsenang
Phobji ཕོབ་སྦྱིས་	Dogsenang Gorphoog དོགས་སེ་ནང་_སྒོར་ཕུག་	Gorphoog
Phobji ཕོབ་སྦྱིས་	Dogsenang Gorphoog དོགས་སེ་ནང་_སྒོར་ཕུག་	Jangchhub Goenpa
Phobji ཕོབ་སྦྱིས་	Dogsenang Gorphoog དོགས་སེ་ནང་_སྒོར་ཕུག་	Khewang
Phobji ཕོབ་སྦྱིས་	Dogsenang Gorphoog དོགས་སེ་ནང་_སྒོར་ཕུག་	Taenkhegeyrey
Phobji ཕོབ་སྦྱིས་	Dogsenang Gorphoog དོགས་སེ་ནང་_སྒོར་ཕུག་	Tshaldar
Phobji ཕོབ་སྦྱིས་	Dogsenang Gorphoog དོགས་སེ་ནང་_སྒོར་ཕུག་	Yuelego
Phobji ཕོབ་སྦྱིས་	Drangpa Pangsar དྲང་པ་_སྤང་གསར་	Drangpa
Phobji ཕོབ་སྦྱིས་	Drangpa Pangsar དྲང་པ་_སྤང་གསར་	Hapa
Phobji ཕོབ་སྦྱིས་	Drangpa Pangsar དྲང་པ་_སྤང་གསར་	Pangsar
Phobji ཕོབ་སྦྱིས་	Khemdro Nemphel ཁྱེམ་འཀྲོ་_ནེམ་འཕེལ་	Chemdro
Phobji ཕོབ་སྦྱིས་	Khemdro Nemphel ཁྱེམ་འཀྲོ་_ནེམ་འཕེལ་	Khemdro
Phobji ཕོབ་སྦྱིས་	Khemdro Nemphel ཁྱེམ་འཀྲོ་_ནེམ་འཕེལ་	Logchen
Phobji ཕོབ་སྦྱིས་	Khemdro Nemphel ཁྱེམ་འཀྲོ་_ནེམ་འཕེལ་	Darjeygyab
Phobji ཕོབ་སྦྱིས་	Khemdro Nemphel ཁྱེམ་འཀྲོ་_ནེམ་འཕེལ་	Kikhorthang
Phobji ཕོབ་སྦྱིས་	Khemdro Nemphel ཁྱེམ་འཀྲོ་_ནེམ་འཕེལ་	Kilthang
Phobji ཕོབ་སྦྱིས་	Khemdro Nemphel ཁྱེམ་འཀྲོ་_ནེམ་འཕེལ་	Nemphel
Phobji ཕོབ་སྦྱིས་	Khemdro Nemphel ཁྱེམ་འཀྲོ་_ནེམ་འཕེལ་	Ram Sarp
Phobji ཕོབ་སྦྱིས་	Khemdro Nemphel ཁྱེམ་འཀྲོ་_ནེམ་འཕེལ་	Tarchen
Phobji ཕོབ་སྦྱིས་	Talachen Tawa Taphoog རྟ་ལ་ཅན་_ལྟ་བ་_རྟ་ཕུག་	Chaji
Phobji ཕོབ་སྦྱིས་	Talachen Tawa Taphoog རྟ་ལ་ཅན་_ལྟ་བ་_རྟ་ཕུག་	Gang-gyed
Phobji ཕོབ་སྦྱིས་	Talachen Tawa Taphoog རྟ་ལ་ཅན་_ལྟ་བ་_རྟ་ཕུག་	Nyimdrosa
Phobji ཕོབ་སྦྱིས་	Talachen Tawa Taphoog རྟ་ལ་ཅན་_ལྟ་བ་_རྟ་ཕུག་	Poelam
Phobji ཕོབ་སྦྱིས་	Talachen Tawa Taphoog རྟ་ལ་ཅན་_ལྟ་བ་_རྟ་ཕུག་	Taphoog
Phobji ཕོབ་སྦྱིས་	Talachen Tawa Taphoog རྟ་ལ་ཅན་_ལྟ་བ་_རྟ་ཕུག་	Talachen
Phobji ཕོབ་སྦྱིས་	Talachen Tawa Taphoog རྟ་ལ་ཅན་_ལྟ་བ་_རྟ་ཕུག་	Taphoog
Phobji ཕོབ་སྦྱིས་	Talachen Tawa Taphoog རྟ་ལ་ཅན་_ལྟ་བ་_རྟ་ཕུག་	Tawa
Phobji ཕོབ་སྦྱིས་	Talachen Tawa Taphoog རྟ་ལ་ཅན་_ལྟ་བ་_རྟ་ཕུག་	Zhilam
Phobji ཕོབ་སྦྱིས་	Talachen Tawa Taphoog རྟ་ལ་ཅན་_ལྟ་བ་_རྟ་ཕུག་	Zhephoog
Ruepisa རུས་སྦིས་ས་	Zamding ཟམ་ལྡིང་	Aaleygang
Ruepisa རུས་སྦིས་ས་	Zamding ཟམ་ལྡིང་	Beygongma
Ruepisa རུས་སྦིས་ས་	Zamding ཟམ་ལྡིང་	Chhagtshalkhar
Ruepisa རུས་སྦིས་ས་	Zamding ཟམ་ལྡིང་	Dochhoongthoor
Ruepisa རུས་སྦིས་ས་	Zamding ཟམ་ལྡིང་	Jaserkha
Ruepisa རུས་སྦིས་ས་	Zamding ཟམ་ལྡིང་	Khamzhog
Ruepisa རུས་སྦིས་ས་	Zamding ཟམ་ལྡིང་	Nyalakha
Ruepisa རུས་སྦིས་ས་	Zamding ཟམ་ལྡིང་	Omtekha
Ruepisa རུས་སྦིས་ས་	Zamding ཟམ་ལྡིང་	Oharkha
Ruepisa རུས་སྦིས་ས་	Zamding ཟམ་ལྡིང་	Toelakha
Ruepisa རུས་སྦིས་ས་	Zamding ཟམ་ལྡིང་	Zamding
Ruepisa རུས་སྦིས་ས་	Zamding ཟམ་ལྡིང་	Zamding Omtekha
Ruepisa རུས་སྦིས་ས་	Bangtoedkha བང་སྟོད་ཁ་	Agokha
Ruepisa རུས་སྦིས་ས་	Bangtoedkha བང་སྟོད་ཁ་	Baeneybi
Ruepisa རུས་སྦིས་ས་	Bangtoedkha བང་སྟོད་ཁ་	Baegokha
Ruepisa རུས་སྦིས་ས་	Bangtoedkha བང་སྟོད་ཁ་	Chhilikha
Ruepisa རུས་སྦིས་ས་	Bangtoedkha བང་སྟོད་ཁ་	Chhumigtengkha
Ruepisa རུས་སྦིས་ས་	Bangtoedkha བང་སྟོད་ཁ་	Damchen
Ruepisa རུས་སྦིས་ས་	Bangtoedkha བང་སྟོད་ཁ་	Damrukha
Ruepisa རུས་སྦིས་ས་	Bangtoedkha བང་སྟོད་ཁ་	Doegorchabsa
Ruepisa རུས་སྦིས་ས་	Bangtoedkha བང་སྟོད་ཁ་	Gongkha
Ruepisa རུས་སྦིས་ས་	Bangtoedkha བང་སྟོད་ཁ་	Jangsanang
Ruepisa རུས་སྦིས་ས་	Bangtoedkha བང་སྟོད་ཁ་	Kibloong
Ruepisa རུས་སྦིས་ས་	Bangtoedkha བང་སྟོད་ཁ་	Kilkhorthang
Ruepisa རུས་སྦིས་ས་	Bangtoedkha བང་སྟོད་ཁ་	Langdo
Ruepisa རུས་སྦིས་ས་	Bangtoedkha བང་སྟོད་ཁ་	Loongchoongna
Ruepisa རུས་སྦིས་ས་	Bangtoedkha བང་སྟོད་ཁ་	Lungmagang
Ruepisa རུས་སྦིས་ས་	Bangtoedkha བང་སྟོད་ཁ་	Marphelkha
Ruepisa རུས་སྦིས་ས་	Bangtoedkha བང་སྟོད་ཁ་	Namgayling
Ruepisa རུས་སྦིས་ས་	Bangtoedkha བང་སྟོད་ཁ་	Neygo
Ruepisa རུས་སྦིས་ས་	Bangtoedkha བང་སྟོད་ཁ་	Nyachhegyekha
Ruepisa རུས་སྦིས་ས་	Bangtoedkha བང་སྟོད་ཁ་	Nyalabi
Ruepisa རུས་སྦིས་ས་	Bangtoedkha བང་སྟོད་ཁ་	Neygobara
Ruepisa རུས་སྦིས་ས་	Bangtoedkha བང་སྟོད་ཁ་	Nyizergang
Ruepisa རུས་སྦིས་ས་	Bangtoedkha བང་སྟོད་ཁ་	Omchen
Ruepisa རུས་སྦིས་ས་	Bangtoedkha བང་སྟོད་ཁ་	Rambigang
Ruepisa རུས་སྦིས་ས་	Bangtoedkha བང་སྟོད་ཁ་	Ruemina
Ruepisa རུས་སྦིས་ས་	Bangtoedkha བང་སྟོད་ཁ་	Ruetoedkha
Ruepisa རུས་སྦིས་ས་	Bangtoedkha བང་སྟོད་ཁ་	Samdrubgang
Ruepisa རུས་སྦིས་ས་	Bangtoedkha བང་སྟོད་ཁ་	Samarkha
Ruepisa རུས་སྦིས་ས་	Bangtoedkha བང་སྟོད་ཁ་	Samten Goenpa
Ruepisa རུས་སྦིས་ས་	Bangtoedkha བང་སྟོད་ཁ་	Tashidingkha
Ruepisa རུས་སྦིས་ས་	Bangtoedkha བང་སྟོད་ཁ་	Terkana
Ruepisa རུས་སྦིས་ས་	Bangtoedkha བང་སྟོད་ཁ་	Tshamchhog
Ruepisa རུས་སྦིས་ས་	Bangtoedkha བང་སྟོད་ཁ་	Tshamonang
Ruepisa རུས་སྦིས་ས་	Bangtoedkha བང་སྟོད་ཁ་	Tshamokha
Ruepisa རུས་སྦིས་ས་	Bjagphug བྱག་ཕུག་	Dagphoog
Ruepisa རུས་སྦིས་ས་	Bjagphug བྱག་ཕུག་	Dagphugyen
Ruepisa རུས་སྦིས་ས་	Bjagphug བྱག་ཕུག་	Drongmaed
Ruepisa རུས་སྦིས་ས་	Bjagphug བྱག་ཕུག་	Golegkhar
Ruepisa རུས་སྦིས་ས་	Bjagphug བྱག་ཕུག་	Sheltogkha
Ruepisa རུས་སྦིས་ས་	Gyala རྒྱ་ལ་	Gyala
Ruepisa རུས་སྦིས་ས་	Gyala རྒྱ་ལ་	Ruechhedkha
Ruepisa རུས་སྦིས་ས་	Gyala རྒྱ་ལ་	Wangduena
Ruepisa རུས་སྦིས་ས་	Gyala རྒྱ་ལ་	Drolmanang
Ruepisa རུས་སྦིས་ས་	Oola ཨུ་ལ་	Oola
Ruepisa རུས་སྦིས་ས་	Oola ཨུ་ལ་	Sergaykha
Ruepisa རུས་སྦིས་ས་	Khothangkha མཁོ་ཐང་ཁ་	Dongphel
Ruepisa རུས་སྦིས་ས་	Khothangkha མཁོ་ཐང་ཁ་	Sheley
Ruepisa རུས་སྦིས་ས་	Khothangkha མཁོ་ཐང་ཁ་	Khothangkha
Ruepisa རུས་སྦིས་ས་	Khothangkha མཁོ་ཐང་ཁ་	Khothangkha Jongphel
Sephu སྲས་ཕུག་	Booso Zeri བུ་གསོ་_ཟེ་རི་	Booso
Sephu སྲས་ཕུག་	Booso Zeri བུ་གསོ་_ཟེ་རི་	Darrilog
Sephu སྲས་ཕུག་	Booso Zeri བུ་གསོ་_ཟེ་རི་	Langbi
Sephu སྲས་ཕུག་	Booso Zeri བུ་གསོ་_ཟེ་རི་	Loobear
Sephu སྲས་ཕུག་	Booso Zeri བུ་གསོ་_ཟེ་རི་	Wangdue Goenpa
Sephu སྲས་ཕུག་	Booso Zeri བུ་གསོ་_ཟེ་རི་	Zeri
Sephu སྲས་ཕུག་	Longtoed གློང་སྟོད་	Gangchhukha
Sephu སྲས་ཕུག་	Longtoed གློང་སྟོད་	Longmaed
Sephu སྲས་ཕུག་	Longtoed གློང་སྟོད་	Riwanang
Sephu སྲས་ཕུག་	Longtoed གློང་སྟོད་	Longtoed
Sephu སྲས་ཕུག་	Boommilog བུ་མོ་མི་ལོག་	Boomilog
Sephu སྲས་ཕུག་	Nakha ན་ཁ་	Nakha
Sephu སྲས་ཕུག་	Nakha ན་ཁ་	Nangkha (Sagatenten)
Sephu སྲས་ཕུག་	Nakha ན་ཁ་	Rabo
Sephu སྲས་ཕུག་	Nakha ན་ཁ་	Serthang
Sephu སྲས་ཕུག་	Rukoobji རུ་ཀུབ་སྦྱིས་	Rukoobji
Thedtsho ཐེད་ཚོ་	Martaloongchu དམར་ཏ་ལུང་ཅུ་	Tartaloongchu
Thedtsho ཐེད་ཚོ་	Thanggoo ཐང་མགུ་	Thang Goo
Thedtsho ཐེད་ཚོ་	Wangjokha ཝང་ཇོ་ཁ་	Wangjokha
Thedtsho ཐེད་ཚོ་	Jang Rinchhengang བྱང་_རིན་ཆེན་སྒང་	Gawaphel
Thedtsho ཐེད་ཚོ་	Jang Rinchhengang བྱང་_རིན་ཆེན་སྒང་	Rinchhengang
Thedtsho ཐེད་ཚོ་	Lho Rinchhengang ལྷོ་_རིན་ཆེན་སྒང་	Rinchhengang

=== Zhemgang District ===
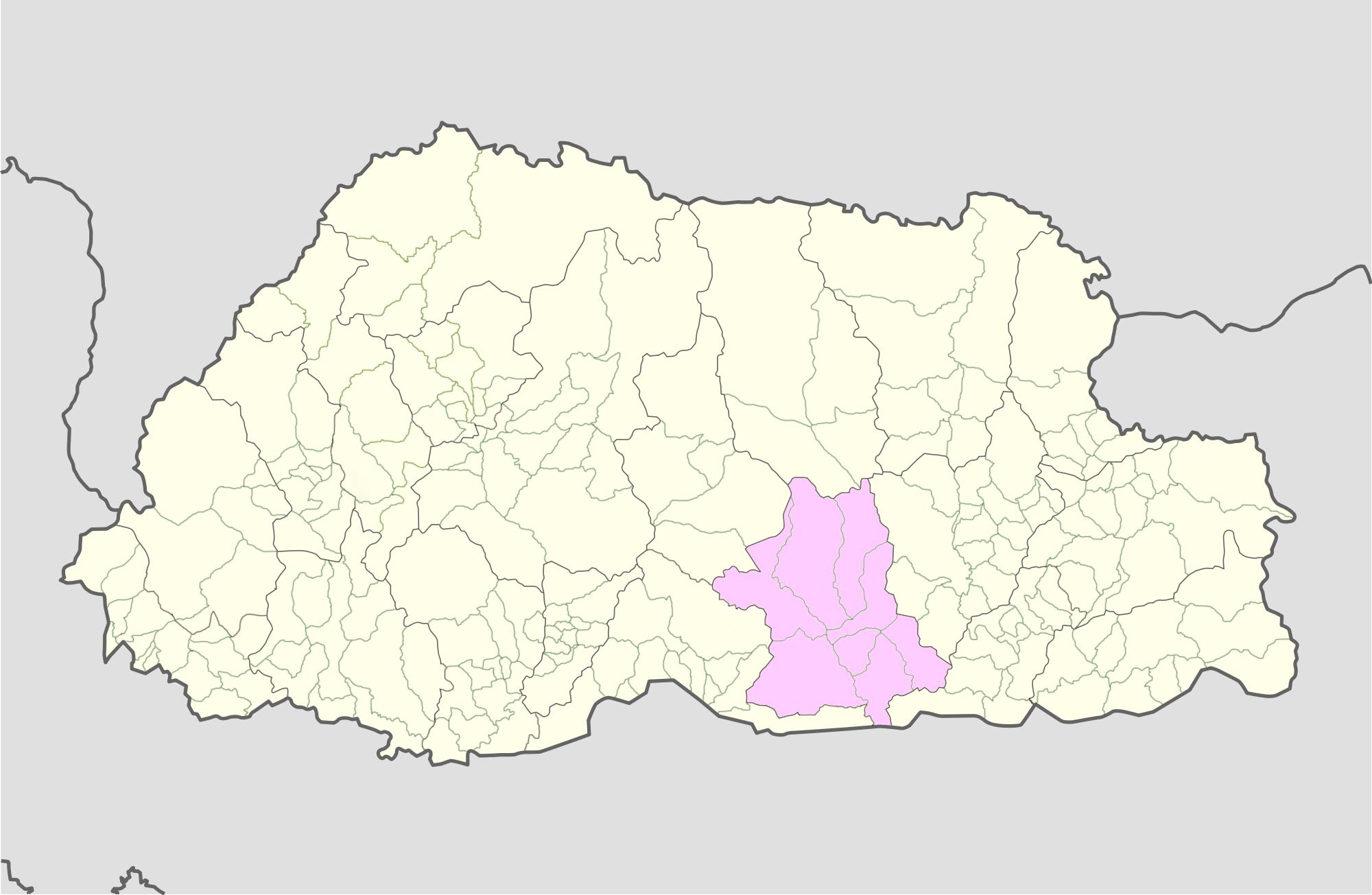
Zhemgang District

Gewog	Chiwog	Village
Bardo བར་རྡོ་	Bardo བར་དོ་	Bardo
Bardo བར་རྡོ་	Khomshar ཁོམ་ཤར་	Khomshar
Bardo བར་རྡོ་	Phulabi ཕུལ་སྦིས་	Phulabi
Bardo བར་རྡོ་	Langdorbi གླང་དོར་སྦིས་	Langdurbi
Bardo བར་རྡོ་	Digala དི་ག་ལ་	Digala
Bjoka འབྱོག་ཀ་	Dali ད་ལི་	Dali
Bjoka འབྱོག་ཀ་	Bjokar འབྱོག་དཀར་	Trong (Bjokar)
Bjoka འབྱོག་ཀ་	Kamati ཀ་མ་ཏི་	Kamati
Bjoka འབྱོག་ཀ་	Barpong Namirgang བར་སྤོང་_ན་མིར་སྒང་	Barpong
Bjoka འབྱོག་ཀ་	Chabdenba Dzarkabla སྐྱབས་བདེན་སྦ་_ཛར་བཀབ་ལ་	Chabdenba
Goshing སྒོ་ཤིང་	Mewangang མེ་དབང་སྒང་	Mewangang
Goshing སྒོ་ཤིང་	Budhashi བུ་ད་ཤི་	Budhashi
Goshing སྒོ་ཤིང་	Lamthang ལམ་ཐང་	Lamthang
Goshing སྒོ་ཤིང་	Lingmapong Samchhoeling གླིང་མ་སྤོང་_བསམས་ཆོས་གླིང་	Limapong
Goshing སྒོ་ཤིང་	Lingmapong Samchhoeling གླིང་མ་སྤོང་_བསམས་ཆོས་གླིང་	Samchheoling
Goshing སྒོ་ཤིང་	Lichibi ལི་ཅི་སྦིས་	Lichibi
Nangkor ནང་སྐོར་	Dakphel Tali བདག་འཕེལ་_ཏ་ལི་	Dakphel
Nangkor ནང་སྐོར་	Dakphel Tali བདག་འཕེལ་_ཏ་ལི་	Kidkhar
Nangkor ནང་སྐོར་	Dakphel Tali བདག་འཕེལ་_ཏ་ལི་	Tali
Nangkor ནང་སྐོར་	Buli བུ་ལི་	Buli
Nangkor ནང་སྐོར་	Buli བུ་ལི་	Buli Goenpa
Nangkor ནང་སྐོར་	Goleng མགོ་ལེངས་	Goleng
Nangkor ནང་སྐོར་	Goleng མགོ་ལེངས་	Zhobleng
Nangkor ནང་སྐོར་	Nyakha ཉ་མཁའ་	Nyakha
Nangkor ནང་སྐོར་	Nyakha ཉ་མཁའ་	Tsheldang
Nangkor ནང་སྐོར་	Duenmang མདུན་མང་	Duenmang
Nangkor ནང་སྐོར་	Duenmang མདུན་མང་	Jimjong
Nangkor ནང་སྐོར་	Duenmang མདུན་མང་	Kamjong
Ngangla ངང་ལ་	Kagtong བཀག་སྟོང་	Jangkhar
Ngangla ངང་ལ་	Kagtong བཀག་སྟོང་	Katong
Ngangla ངང་ལ་	Ngangla Trong ངང་ལ་ཀྲོང་	Ngangla Trong
Ngangla ངང་ལ་	Ngangla Trong ངང་ལ་ཀྲོང་	Pongchaling
Ngangla ངང་ལ་	Ribati རི་བ་ཏི་	Ribati
Ngangla ངང་ལ་	Marangdued མ་རང་འདུད་	Marangdued
Ngangla ངང་ལ་	Marangdued མ་རང་འདུད་	Yumdang
Ngangla ངང་ལ་	Panbang Sonamthang སྤན་བང་_བསོད་ནམས་ཐང་	Panbang
Ngangla ངང་ལ་	Panbang Sonamthang སྤན་བང་_བསོད་ནམས་ཐང་	Thinleygang
Ngangla ངང་ལ་	Panbang Sonamthang སྤན་བང་_བསོད་ནམས་ཐང་	Sonamthang
Phangkhar ཕང་མཁར་	Pongchola Dadijong སྤོང་ཅོ་ལ་_སྤྲ་སྡི་ལྗོངས་	Chabgoen
Phangkhar ཕང་མཁར་	Pongchola Dadijong སྤོང་ཅོ་ལ་_སྤྲ་སྡི་ལྗོངས་	Pongchola
Phangkhar ཕང་མཁར་	Pongchola Dadijong སྤོང་ཅོ་ལ་_སྤྲ་སྡི་ལྗོངས་	Tadijong
Phangkhar ཕང་མཁར་	Mamong Trong Pantang མ་མོང་ཀྲོང་_སྤན་སྟང་	Mamong Trong
Phangkhar ཕང་མཁར་	Mamong Trong Pantang མ་མོང་ཀྲོང་_སྤན་སྟང་	Pantang
Phangkhar ཕང་མཁར་	Panabi པཱ་ན་སྦིས་	Panabi
Phangkhar ཕང་མཁར་	Panabi པཱ་ན་སྦིས་	Zangbi
Phangkhar ཕང་མཁར་	Shalingtoed Tashibi ཤ་གླིང་སྟད་_བཀྲིས་སྦིས་	Salapong
Phangkhar ཕང་མཁར་	Shalingtoed Tashibi ཤ་གླིང་སྟད་_བཀྲིས་སྦིས་	Tashibi
Phangkhar ཕང་མཁར་	Shalingtoed Tashibi ཤ་གླིང་སྟད་_བཀྲིས་སྦིས་	Shalingtoed
Phangkhar ཕང་མཁར་	Chagngarzam ལྕགས་ངར་ཟམ་	Chag-Ngar-Zam
Shingkhar ཤིང་མཁར་	Singkhar ཤིང་མགྷར་	Shingkhar
Shingkhar ཤིང་མཁར་	Wamling ཝམ་གླིང་	Wamling
Shingkhar ཤིང་མཁར་	Thrisa ཁྲི་ས་	Thrisa
Shingkhar ཤིང་མཁར་	Radi རཱ་སྡི་	Radi
Shingkhar ཤིང་མཁར་	Nyimzong Thajong ཉིམ་གཞོང་_མཐའ་ལྗོངས་	Nyimzhong
Shingkhar ཤིང་མཁར་	Nyimzong Thajong ཉིམ་གཞོང་_མཐའ་ལྗོངས་	Thajong
Shingkhar ཤིང་མཁར་	Nyimzong Thajong ཉིམ་གཞོང་_མཐའ་ལྗོངས་	Zangling
Trong ཀྲོང་	Dangkhar Trong དང་མཁར་_ཀྲོང་	Dangkhar
Trong ཀྲོང་	Dangkhar Trong དང་མཁར་_ཀྲོང་	Trong
Trong ཀྲོང་	Berti Tagma བེར་ཏི་_སྟག་མ་	Berti
Trong ཀྲོང་	Berti Tagma བེར་ཏི་_སྟག་མ་	Tamag
Trong ཀྲོང་	Tshanglajong Zurphel ཚང་ལ་ལྗོངས་_ཟུར་འཕེལ་	Tshanglajong
Trong ཀྲོང་	Tshanglajong Zurphel ཚང་ལ་ལྗོངས་_ཟུར་འཕེལ་	Zurphel
Trong ཀྲོང་	Soobdrang བསྲུབ་བྲང་	Soobdrang
Trong ཀྲོང་	Gongphu གོང་ཕུ་	Gomphu

== Notes ==
1. Residents of Nubri Chiwog voted in other chiwogs during 2011 elections. It did not form its own electoral precinct.
2. Goentegkha Tongshingang chiwog contains voters from village(s) "unknown"

== See also ==
- Thromde (municipality)
- Chiwog
- Gewog (village block)
- Dungkhag (sub-district)
- Dzongkhag (district)
- List of cities, towns and villages in Bhutan
- List of cities in Bhutan
