= List of cities, towns and villages in Bhutan =

This is an alphabetical list of settlements in Bhutan.

- For a list of the main cities and towns see List of cities in Bhutan.
- For a list of government-designated municipalities, see Thromde.
- For a list of villages, see List of villages in Bhutan.

== List of settlements in Bhutan ==
- Autsho
- Balung
- Banjar
- Bartsha
- Betsamang
- Bilam
- Bondey
- Buli
- Bumpailog
- Changmey
- Chendebji
- Chhiya
- Chitokha
- Chhubar
- Chuyul
- Daga/Dagana
- Dagapela
- Damji
- Damphu
- Dangchu
- Darla
- Deothang
- Dhur
- Dodennang
- Dolepchen
- Dragchhu
- Dramitse
- Galegchhu
- Gangpar
- Gasa
- Gedu
- Gelephu
- Geychhukha
- Gomtu
- Gyalgong
- Gyalpozhing
- Haa
- Haragangkha
- Hebesa
- Hlari
- Jakar
- Jasabi
- Jiri
- Kanglung
- Ketokha
- Khabti
- Khailog
- Khamdang
- Kharsa
- Khoma
- Kidekhar
- Ladrong
- Laya
- Lhamoyzingkhar
- Lhayuel
- Lhuntse
- Lingmethang
- Lobneykha
- Lophokha
- Lunana
- Mebisa
- Merak
- Monchhukha
- Mongar
- Nabji
- Nagling
- Naktshang
- Nangar
- Nasiphel
- Ney
- Ngaloong Gang
- Nganglam
- Nimshong
- Pachu
- Panbang
- Paro
- Pasakha
- Pemagatsel
- Phibsoo
- Phuntsholing
- Prakhar
- Punakha
- Radi
- Ramchongma
- Rangjung
- Rashigang
- Razawog
- Rimtakha (Chapcha)
- Rithangwog
- Romang
- Sako
- Sakteng
- Saling
- Samdrup Choling
- Samdrup Jongkhar
- Samey
- Samtengang
- Samtenling
- Samtse
- Sangkiri
- Sarpang
- Sawang
- Sengor
- Shana
- Shari
- Shawa
- Shayuel
- Shokang
- Sibsu
- Silli
- Tangmachu
- Thimphu
- Thomgang
- Thragom
- Threlphu
- Thrimshing
- Tingma
- Togtokha
- Tongkangla
- Trashigang
- Trashiyangtse
- Trongsa
- Tsanglegkha
- Tshaluna
- Tshangphu
- Tshenzabi
- Ura
- Wamrong
- Wangdue Phodrang
- Wogyal
- Wolakha
- Yalang
- Zhamling
- Zhemgang
- Zhongmaed
