= Dodennang =

Village in Thimphu District, Bhutan

- Location in Bhutan
- Coordinates: 27°35′N 89°38′E
- Country: Bhutan
- District: Thimphu District
- Village block: Kawang Gewog
- Elevation: 2,594 m (8,510 ft)
- Time zone: GMT +5:30

Dodennang is a village in central-western Bhutan. It is located 6.3 miles (10.1 km) northwest of the capital Thimphu in Thimphu District. It lies at an altitude of 2,594 metres (8510 ft).

Nearby settlements include Atsho Chhubar (13.8 miles), Barshong (8.3 miles), Kencho (10.9 miles), Yuwak (13 miles), Punakha (12.6 miles) Thimphu (6.3 miles), Tashi Chho Dzong (6.1 miles), and Tshalunang (9 miles).

== See also ==
- List of cities, towns and villages in Bhutan
