= Dorona Gewog =

- Gewog
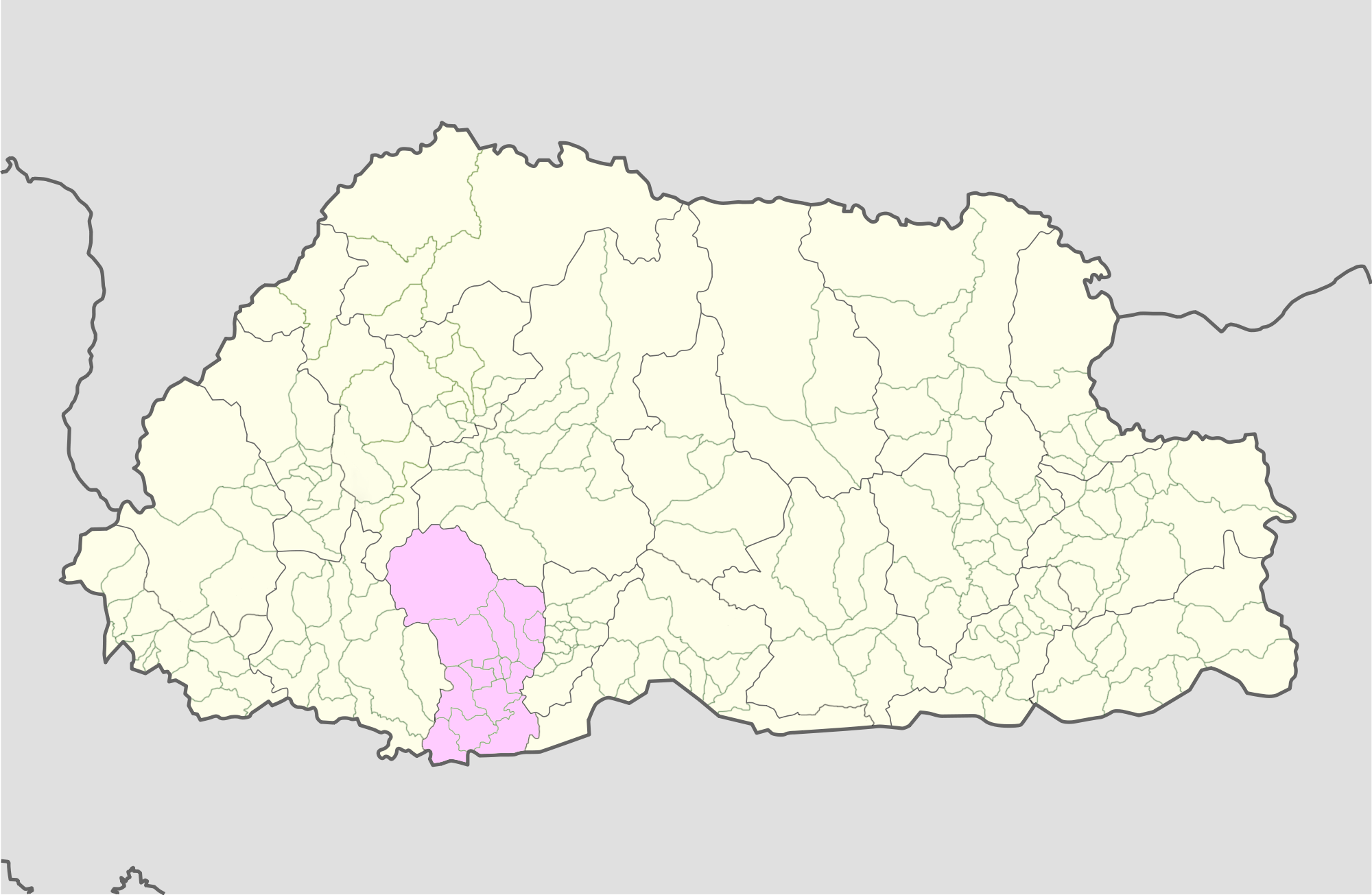
- Location within Dagana District
- Coordinates: 26°51′00″N 89°50′00″E
- Country: Bhutan
- District: Dagana District
- Sub-district: Dagapela Dungkhag

Population (2017)
  - Total: 2,355
- Time zone: UTC+6 (BTT)

Dorona Gewog (Dzongkha: རྡོ་རོ་ན་རྒེད་འོག) is a gewog (village block) of Dagana District, Bhutan. It also comprises part of Dagapela sub-district, along with Goshi and Tashiding Gewogs.

As of 2017 it had a population of 2,355 people, who own 335 acres of dry land and 64 acres of wetland. The gewog is a producer of cardamom and citrus fruits.

== History ==
On September 29, 1990, a group of four unidentified men set fire to a dispensary in Dorona. The attack was in coordination with unrest in southern Bhutan that month between villagers and the administrative authority, who called for better communication with the people. Dzongda Hisey Dorji called a meeting in Nimtoladara on April 4, 1991 to review the southern uprisings.

== Administrative divisions ==
Dorona Gewog is divided administratively into five chiwogs:

- Dorona Chhewa
- Dorona Chhoongwa
- Mangmethang (Maamedthang)
- Nimtola (Nyhitola)
- Tshalamji

== Economy ==
Citrus fruits and cardamom are grown in Dorona, with relatively fewer vegetables grown due to it being further from the market and cut off during the monsoon season. A farm shop was expected to be built by May 2017. Green houses with citrus saplings have been built in Mamedthang chiwog. In November 2016 a Citrus Fruit Drop Collection and Destruction campaign was held in Dorona and Drujegang Gewog, conducted by the National Plant Protection Centre in collaboration with the Dzongkhag Agriculture Sector of Dagana.

Only Mangmethang and Nimtola chiwogs cultivate paddy. In April 2017 a power tiller was introduced by the government to assist in the cultivation of maize on the steep slopes in Nimtola.
