= Bartsha =

- Location in Bhutan
- Coordinates: 26°59′N 89°49′E
- Country: Bhutan
- District: Dagana District
- Village block: Karna Gewog
- Time zone: UTC+6 (BTT)

Bartsha is a town in Dagana District in southwestern Bhutan.
