= Thomgang =

Thomgang མཐོངམ་སྒང Thongmgang, Thumgaon
- Village
- Location in Bhutan
- Coordinates: 26°59′N 89°58′E
- Country: Bhutan
- District: Dagana District
- Village block: Khebisa Gewog
- Time zone: UTC+6 (BTT)

Thomgang is a village in Dagana District in southwestern Bhutan.
