= Usak =

Usak or USAK may refer to:

== Places ==
- Usak, Bhutan
- Ušak, Serbia
- Uşak Province, Turkey
  - Uşak, its capital
  - Uşak (electoral district)

== Other uses ==
- Orkun Usak (born 1980), Turkish footballer
- USAK, International Strategic Research Organization (Turkish: Uluslararası Stratejik Arastirmalar Kurumu), a Turkish think tank
