= Tashiding Gewog =

- Gewog
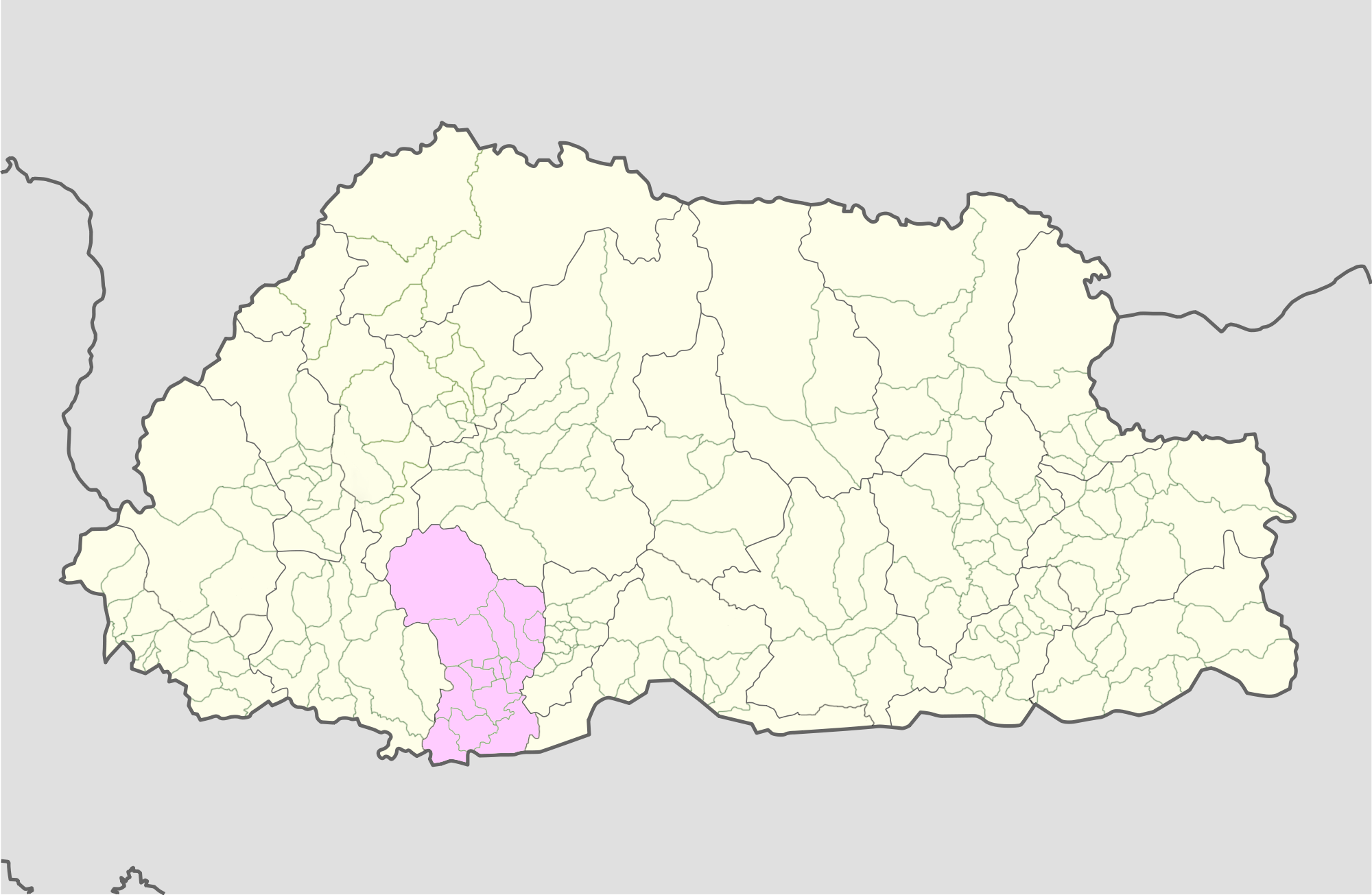
- Location within Dagana District
- Coordinates: 26°55′00″N 90°00′00″E
- Country: Bhutan
- District: Dagana District
- Sub-district: Dagapela Dungkhag
- Time zone: UTC+6 (BTT)

Tashiding Gewog is a gewog (sub district) of Dagana District, Bhutan. It also comprises part of Dagapela Dungkhag (sub-district), along with Dorona and Goshi Gewogs.

== Notable residents ==
- Namgay Peldon, judge and politician serving as Gup, or administrator
