= Pachu =

Pachu may refer to:

== People ==
- Pachu Ojeda (born 1991), Spanish woman footballer
- Pachu Peña (born 1962), Argentine comedian and actor
- Pachu (footballer, born 1986), Equatoguinean woman footballer Maricruz Mangue Oburu Nchama
- Pachu (footballer, born 1996), Brazilian football forward Luiz Henrique Pachu Lira

== Places ==
- Pachu, Bhutan, a town
