= Drukgyegang =

- Location in Bhutan
- Coordinates: 27°1′N 90°0′E
- Country: Bhutan
- District: Dagana District

Population (2005)
  - Total: 552

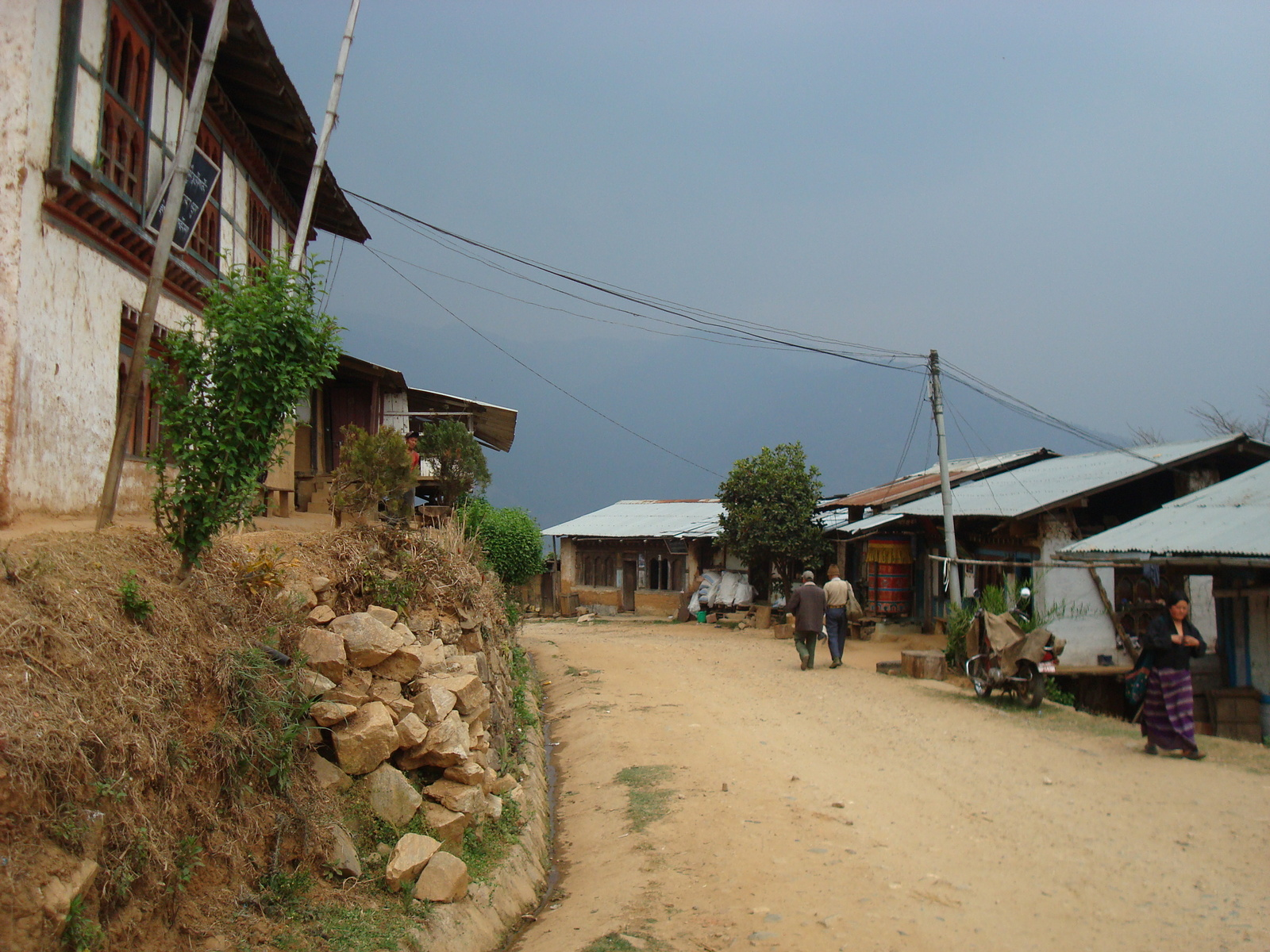
View of Drujegang village in 2009

Drukgyegang, more commonly written as Drujegang, and in the past also as Dujeygang, is a village in Drujegang Gewog in south-western Bhutan. It is located in Dagana District. The village started as a trading post around the present Drujegang High School, a government school with boarding facilities.

At the 2005 census, its population was 552.
