= Rife =

Rife or Rifé may refer to:

== Geography ==
- Ferring Rife, stream in West Sussex, England
- Rife, Bhutan
- Rife, Alberta, a locality in the Municipal District of Bonnyville No. 87, Alberta, Canada
- Rife House (Rogers, Arkansas), U.S.
- Rife Farmstead Osage Mills, Arkansas, U.S.
- Rife House (Shawsville, Virginia), U.S.

== People ==
- Denise Long Rife (born Denise Long; 1951) American basketball player.
- Jack Rife (born 1943), American politician
- John Winebrenner Rife (1846–1908), Republican member of the U.S. House of Representatives
- Josh Rife (born 1979), American soccer player
- Joaquim Rifé (born 1942), Spanish footballer
- Llorenç Rifé Climent (1938 - 2021) Spanish footballer
- Matthew Steven Rife (Matt Rife) (born 1995), American comedian and actor.
- Royal Rife (1888-1971), promoter of medical treatments

== Other uses ==
- Rife (Foetus album)
- Rife machine, an EMT device created by Royal Rife
