= Balung, Bhutan =

Balung བ་ལུང Baloong
- Location in Bhutan
- Coordinates: 27°7′N 89°59.8′E
- Country: Bhutan
- District: Dagana District
- Village block: Lajab Gewog
- Time zone: UTC+6 (BTT)

Balung is a village in Dagana District in southwestern Bhutan.
