= Namgay Peldon =

Namgay Peldon (or Pelden; born c.1980) is a Bhutanese judge and politician. In 2008, she was the first woman to be elected a local governor when she was elected Gup, or administrator, of Tashiding Gewog, a sub-district of Dagana. In this role, she attended the National Leadership Summit at Jaipur, India, in 2012.

Namgay Peldon is married with two children. She considers herself to have been well-educated in comparison with most Bhutanese women. Prior to her election, she worked as a community instructor in the Dagana locality, assisting local people in writing or completing official papers.

Peldon's achievements as Gup have included construction of new offices and roads, renovation of a historic local temple, and building of irrigation channels. She says that her future goals include the construction of a local hospital and further improvements to the water supply. In 2016, she was re-elected with an increased majority, and the Dagana District acquired an additional female Gup when Pema Wangmo Tamang was elected for the first time.
