= Paju (disambiguation) =

Paju is a city in Gyeonggi Province, South Korea.

Paju may also refer to:

== Places ==
- Paju station, subway station in Paju
- Paju, Tartu County, village in Elva Parish, Tartu County, Estonia
- Paju, Valga County, village in Valga Parish, Valga County, Estonia
  - Battle of Paju

== People ==
- Ants Paju (1944–2011), Estonian politician, journalist, athlete, and engineer
- Imbi Paju (born 1959), Estonian journalist, writer and filmmaker

== Arts, media, and entertainment ==
- Paju, a 2009 South Korean film

== See also ==
- Pajo (disambiguation)
