= Tsanglegkha =

- Location in Bhutan
- Coordinates: 27°5′N 89°52′E
- Country: Bhutan
- District: Dagana District
- Village block: Tseza Gewog
- Time zone: UTC+6 (BTT)

Tsanglegkha is a town in Dagana District in southwestern Bhutan.
