= Goshi Gewog =

- Gewog
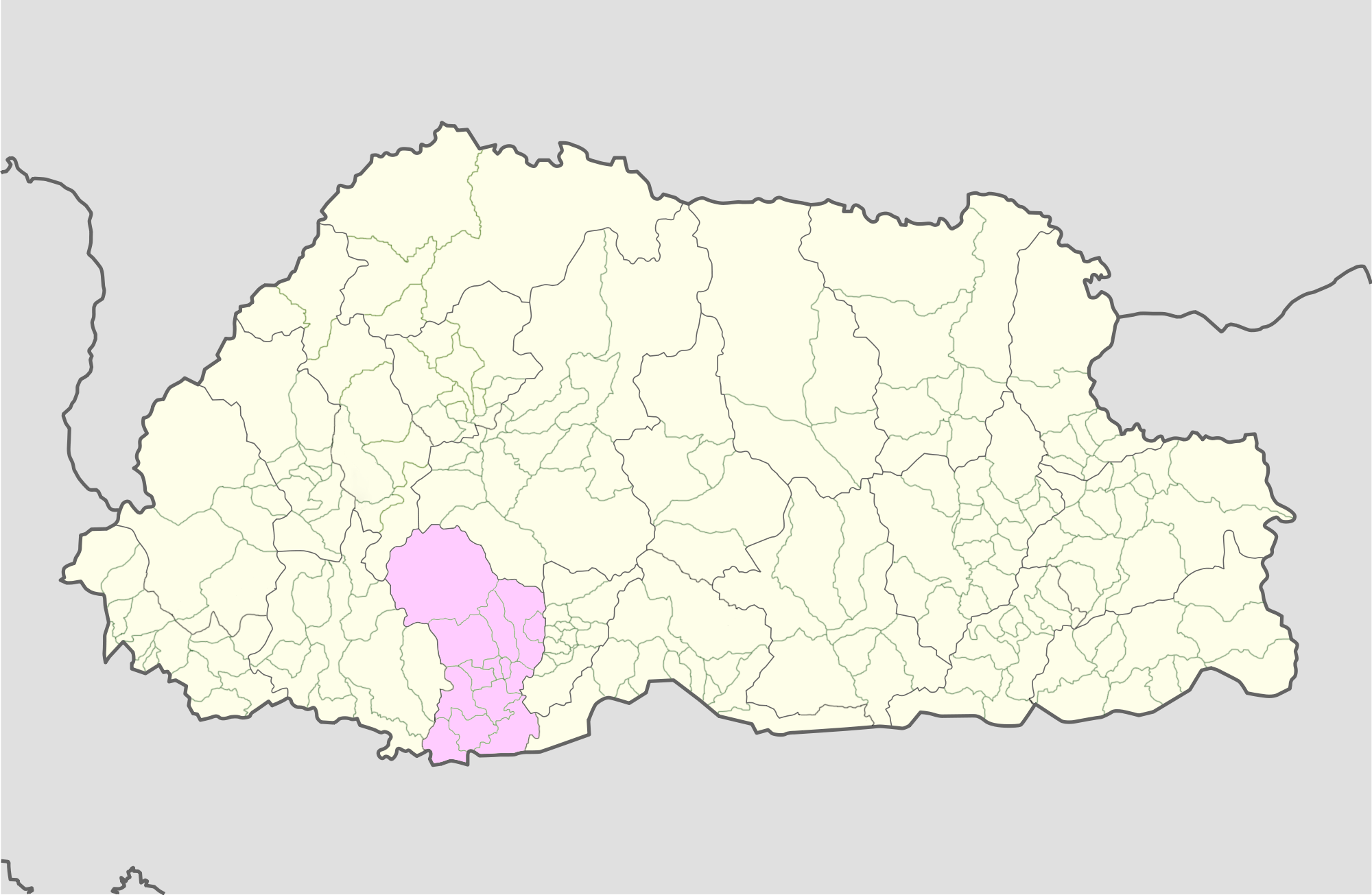
- Location within Dagana District
- Coordinates: 26°55′00″N 89°57′00″E
- Country: Bhutan
- District: Dagana District
- Sub-district: Dagapela Dungkhag
- Time zone: UTC+6 (BTT)

Goshi Gewog is a gewog (village block) of Dagana District, Bhutan. It also comprises part of Dagapela dungkhag, along with Dorona and Tashiding Gewogs.
