= Threlphu =

Threlphu ཁྲལ་ཕུག Threlphoog
- Location in Bhutan
- Coordinates: 27°08.5′N 91°44.5′E
- Country: Bhutan
- District: Trashigang District
- Village block: Kangpar Gewog
- Time zone: UTC+6 (BTT)

Threlphu is a village in Trashigang District in eastern Bhutan.
