= Samtenling =

Samtenling Bhur
- Location in Bhutan
- Coordinates: 26°54′N 90°26′E
- Country: Bhutan
- District: Sarpang District
- Sub-district: Gelephu Dungkhag
- Village block: Samtenling Gewog
- Time zone: UTC+6 (BTT)

Samtenling (Formerly Bhur or Bhurgaon) is a town in Sarpang District in southern Bhutan. It is the seat of Samtenling Gewog.

== Gelephu Mindfulness City ==
The Agriculture Research and Development Centre, Samtenling Regional Seed Centre, Farm Machinary Centre and Bhutan Centennial Distillery have been directed to vacate for demolition as apart of 1,400 acres being bought by the administration for the expansion of Gelephu Airport.

== Climate ==
Climate data for Bhurgaon (1996−2018)
Month	Jan	Feb	Mar	Apr	May	Jun	Jul	Aug	Sep	Oct	Nov	Dec	Year
Mean daily maximum °C (°F)	22.3 (72.1)	24.0 (75.2)	26.3 (79.3)	27.6 (81.7)	28.7 (83.7)	29.1 (84.4)	29.5 (85.1)	30.1 (86.2)	29.6 (85.3)	28.7 (83.7)	26.3 (79.3)	23.9 (75.0)	27.2 (80.9)
Mean daily minimum °C (°F)	13.2 (55.8)	15.8 (60.4)	18.4 (65.1)	20.6 (69.1)	22.3 (72.1)	23.4 (74.1)	24.1 (75.4)	24.3 (75.7)	23.8 (74.8)	21.4 (70.5)	18.1 (64.6)	14.8 (58.6)	20.0 (68.0)
Average precipitation mm (inches)	15.2 (0.60)	27.8 (1.09)	111.4 (4.39)	209.8 (8.26)	436.8 (17.20)	990.2 (38.98)	1,316.4 (51.83)	1,032.6 (40.65)	703.6 (27.70)	196.4 (7.73)	14.5 (0.57)	10.0 (0.39)	5,064.7 (199.39)
Average precipitation days	2.0	3.2	6.5	13.3	18.7	23.2	25.6	23.8	19.0	8.6	1.7	1.7	147.3
Source: World Meteorological Organization
