= Zhamling =

Zhamling ཞམ་གླིང
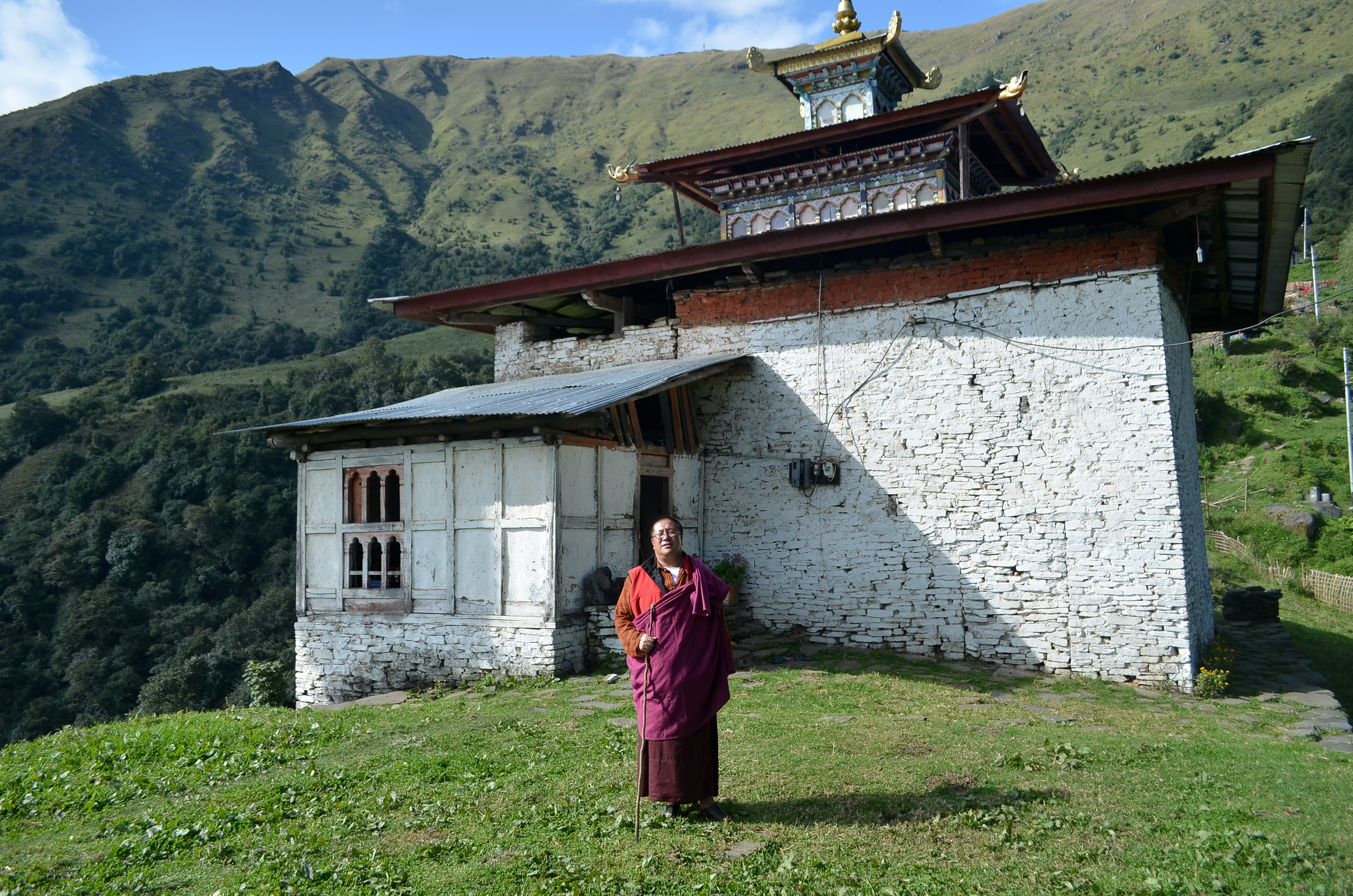
- Khochung Choje Lhakhang in 2012

- Location in Bhutan
- Coordinates: 27°46′N 91°7′E
- Country: Bhutan
- District: Lhuntse District
- Village block: Gangzur Gewog
- Time zone: UTC+6 (BTT)

Zhamling is a village in Lhuntse District in northeastern Bhutan. It is made up of 20 households which predominantly farms potatoes. It's served by the Gangzur Gewog Center Road which connects to Kurtoe Gewog.

Khochung Choje Lhakhang is a Buddhist monastery located above Zhamling, oral history describes the monastery being constructed in the 1500s by Khedrup Kuenga Wangpo, a son of Tertön Pema Lingpa. Khochung Choje is attributed for being the parent line for the Dungkar Choje where Jigme Namgyal and the Wangchuck Dynasty originate from.
