= Ramchongma =

- Location in Bhutan
- Coordinates: 27°4′N 91°34.5′E
- Country: Bhutan
- District: Trashigang District
- Sub-district: Thrimshing Dungkhag
- Village block: Thrimshing Gewog
- Time zone: UTC+6 (BTT)

Ramchongma is a village in Trashigang District in eastern Bhutan.
