= Lobneykha =

Lang Nyelsa གླང་ཉལ་ས Lobneykha
- Town
- Location in Bhutan
- Coordinates: 27°9′N 89°33′E
- Country: Bhutan
- District: Chukha District
- Village block: Chapcha Gewog
- Time zone: UTC+6 (BTT)

Lobneykha, (Note: also spelled Lobnyekha or Lobney) officially Lang Nyelsa, is a town in Chukha District in southwestern Bhutan.
