= Buli, Bhutan =

Coordinates: 27°09′59.2″N 90°48′58.8″E

Buli is a village in the Zhemgang district in Bhutan. The village is located in the Nangkor Gewog of Zhemgang District in central Bhutan.

== See also ==
- List of cities, towns and villages in Bhutan
