= Monchhukha =

Monchhukha Mongergaon
- Location in Bhutan
- Coordinates: 27°4′N 90°26′E
- Country: Bhutan
- District: Sarpang District
- Village block: Jigmechhoeling Gewog
- Elevation: 2,656 m (8,714 ft)

Monchhukha is a village in southern Bhutan. It is located in Sarpang District.

== See also ==
- List of cities, towns and villages in Bhutan
