= Wogyal =

- Location in Bhutan
- Coordinates: 27°15′N 90°0′E
- Country: Bhutan
- District: Wangdue Phodrang District
- Village block: Darkar Gewog
- Time zone: UTC+6 (BTT)

Wogyal is a village in Wangdue Phodrang District in central Bhutan.
