= Thrimshing =

Thrimshing ཁྲིམས་ཤིང
- Village
- Location in Bhutan
- Coordinates: 27°7.5′N 91°38′E
- Country: Bhutan
- District: Trashigang District
- Sub-district: Thrimshing Dungkhag
- Village block: Thrimshing Gewog
- Time zone: UTC+6 (BTT)

Thrimshing is a village in Trashigang District in eastern Bhutan.
