= Nagling, Kurtoe =

Nagling ནག་གླིང
- Village
- Location in Bhutan
- Coordinates: 27°53′N 91°8.5′E
- Country: Bhutan
- District: Lhuntse District
- Village block: Kurtoe Gewog
- Time zone: UTC+6 (BTT)

Nagling is a village in Lhuntse District in northeastern Bhutan.
