= Silli, Bhutan =

Silli སི་ལི
- Location in Bhutan
- Coordinates: 27°10.6′N 89°59.3′E
- Country: Bhutan
- District: Wangdue Phodrang District
- Village block: Darkar Gewog
- Time zone: UTC+6 (BTT)

Silli is a village in Wangdue Phodrang District in central Bhutan.
