= Samey, Bhutan =

Samey ས་སྨད Samaed, Samay
- Village
- Location in Bhutan
- Coordinates: 27°06.5′N 89°51.5′E
- Country: Bhutan
- District: Dagana District
- Village block: Tseza Gewog
- Time zone: UTC+6 (BTT)

Samey is a village in Dagana District in southwestern Bhutan.
