= Lophokha =

Lophokha ལོ་ཕོ་ཁ
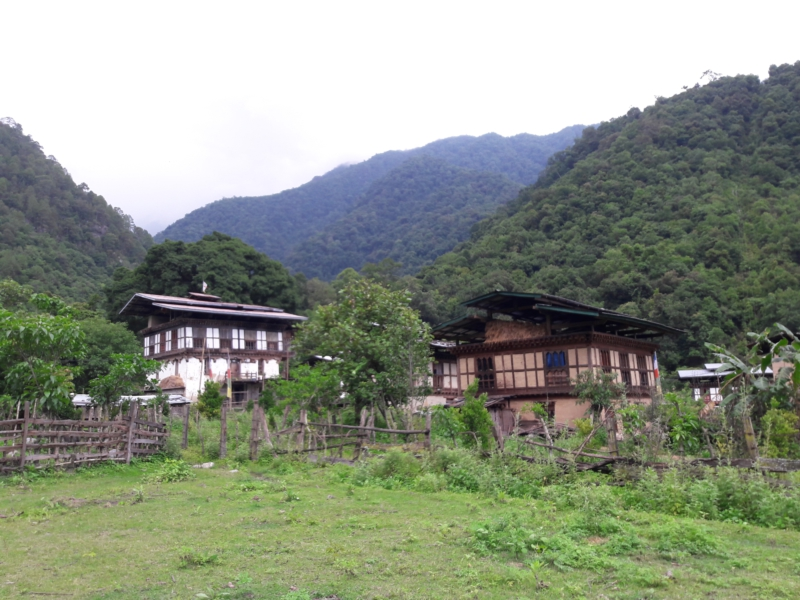
- Traditional houses in Lophokha

- Location in Bhutan
- Coordinates: 27°18′N 90°06.7′E
- Country: Bhutan
- District: Wangdue Phodrang
- Village block: Athang Gewog

Lophokha is a village in central-southern Bhutan. It is located in Wangdue Phodrang District.

== See also ==
- List of cities, towns and villages in Bhutan
