= Gangpar =

- Location in Bhutan
- Coordinates: 27°10′N 91°44′E
- Country: Bhutan
- District: Trashigang District
- Village block: Kangpar Gewog
- Time zone: UTC+6 (BTT)

Gangpar is a town in Trashigang District in eastern Bhutan.
