= Hebesa, Bhutan =

Hebesa
- Location in Bhutan
- Coordinates: 27°21′N 89°54′E
- Country: Bhutan
- District: Wangdue Phodrang District
- Village block: Nahi Gewog

Ama is a village in central-southern Bhutan. It is located in Wangdue Phodrang District.

== See also ==
- List of cities, towns and villages in Bhutan
