= Jasabi =

Jasabi རྒྱ་ས་སྦིས
- Village
- Location in Bhutan
- Coordinates: 27°49.8′N 91°6′E
- Country: Bhutan
- District: Lhuntse District
- Village block: Kurtoe Gewog
- Time zone: UTC+6 (BTT)

Jasabi is a village in Lhuntse District in northeastern Bhutan.

== See also ==
- Swat Museum
