= Pajo =

Pajo may refer to:

- Pajo, a surname
  - Ave Pajo (born 1984), Estonian football player
  - David Pajo (born 1968), American musician
  - Louise Pajo (1940–2020), British actress
  - Ludmilla Pajo (1947–1995), Moscow-born Albanian writer and journalist
- Pajo (given name), a South Slavic masculine name
- Pajo (mountain), a mountain in Peru
- Pajo, Bhutan, a town in Punakha District
- Pajo, Dompu, a district in West Nusa Tenggara, Indonesia
- Pajø, a Shilluk people village in Sudan
