= Karmaling Gewog =

- Gewog
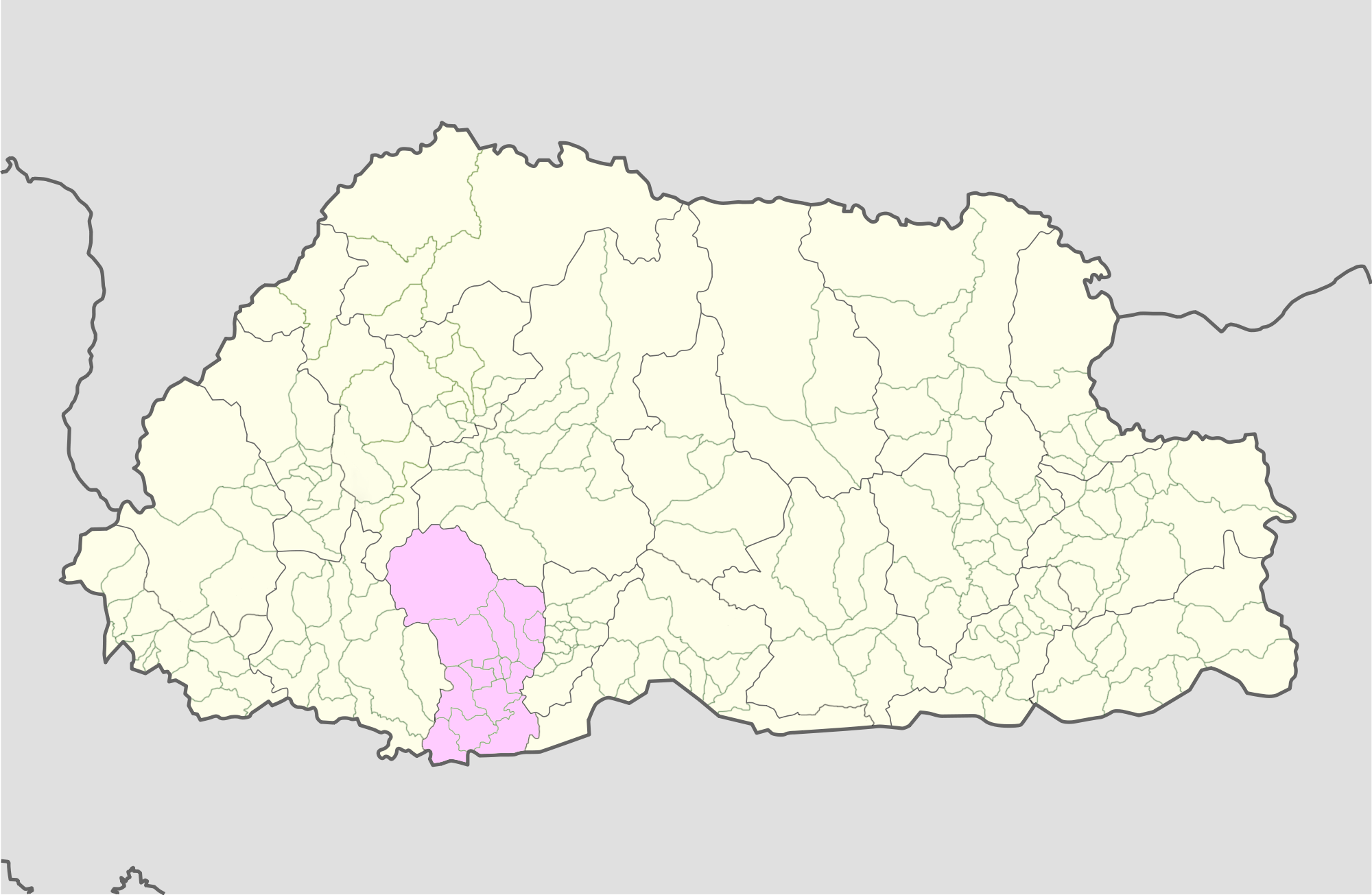
- Location within Dagana District
- Coordinates: 26°46′00″N 89°52′00″E
- Country: Bhutan
- District: Dagana District
- Time zone: UTC+6 (BTT)

Karmaling Gewog is a gewog (village block) of Dagana District, Bhutan.
