= Sako, Bhutan =

Sako ས་བརྐོ
- Village
- Location in Bhutan
- Coordinates: 27°4.8′N 91°34′E
- Country: Bhutan
- District: Trashigang District
- Village block: Thrimshing Gewog
- Time zone: UTC+6 (BTT)

Sako is a village in Trashigang District in eastern Bhutan.
