= Khabti =

Khabti ཁབས་སྟི
- Location in Bhutan
- Coordinates: 27°20′N 91°36.5′E
- Country: Bhutan
- District: Trashigang District
- Village block: Samkhar Gewog
- Time zone: UTC+6 (BTT)

Khabti is a village in Trashigang District in eastern Bhutan.
