= Ladrong =

Ladrong ལ་གྲོང
- Village
- Location in Bhutan
- Coordinates: 27°27′44″N 91°06′35″E
- Country: Bhutan
- District: Lhuntse District
- Village block: Jaray Gewog
- Time zone: UTC+6 (BTT)

Ladrong is a village in Lhuntse District in northeastern Bhutan.
