= Tshangphu =

Tshangphu ཚང་ཕུ
- Village
- Location in Bhutan
- Coordinates: 27°27.7′N 91°13.3′E
- Country: Bhutan
- District: Lhuntse District
- Village block: Tsenkhar Gewog
- Time zone: UTC+6 (BTT)

Tshangphu is a village in Lhuntse District in northeastern Bhutan.
