= Geychhukha =

Geychhukha དགེ་ཆུ་ཁ Gedchu
- Location in Bhutan
- Coordinates: 27°25′N 89°15′E
- Country: Bhutan
- District: Haa District
- Village block: Bji Gewog
- Time zone: UTC+6 (BTT)

Geychhukha is a village in Haa District in southwestern Bhutan.
