= Bilam =

Bilam སྦིས་ལམ
- Location in Bhutan
- Coordinates: 27°6′N 91°15′E
- Country: Bhutan
- District: Mongar District
- Village block: Jurmey Gewog
- Time zone: UTC+6 (BTT)

Bilam is a village in Mongar District in southeastern-central Bhutan.
