= Karna Gewog =

- Gewog
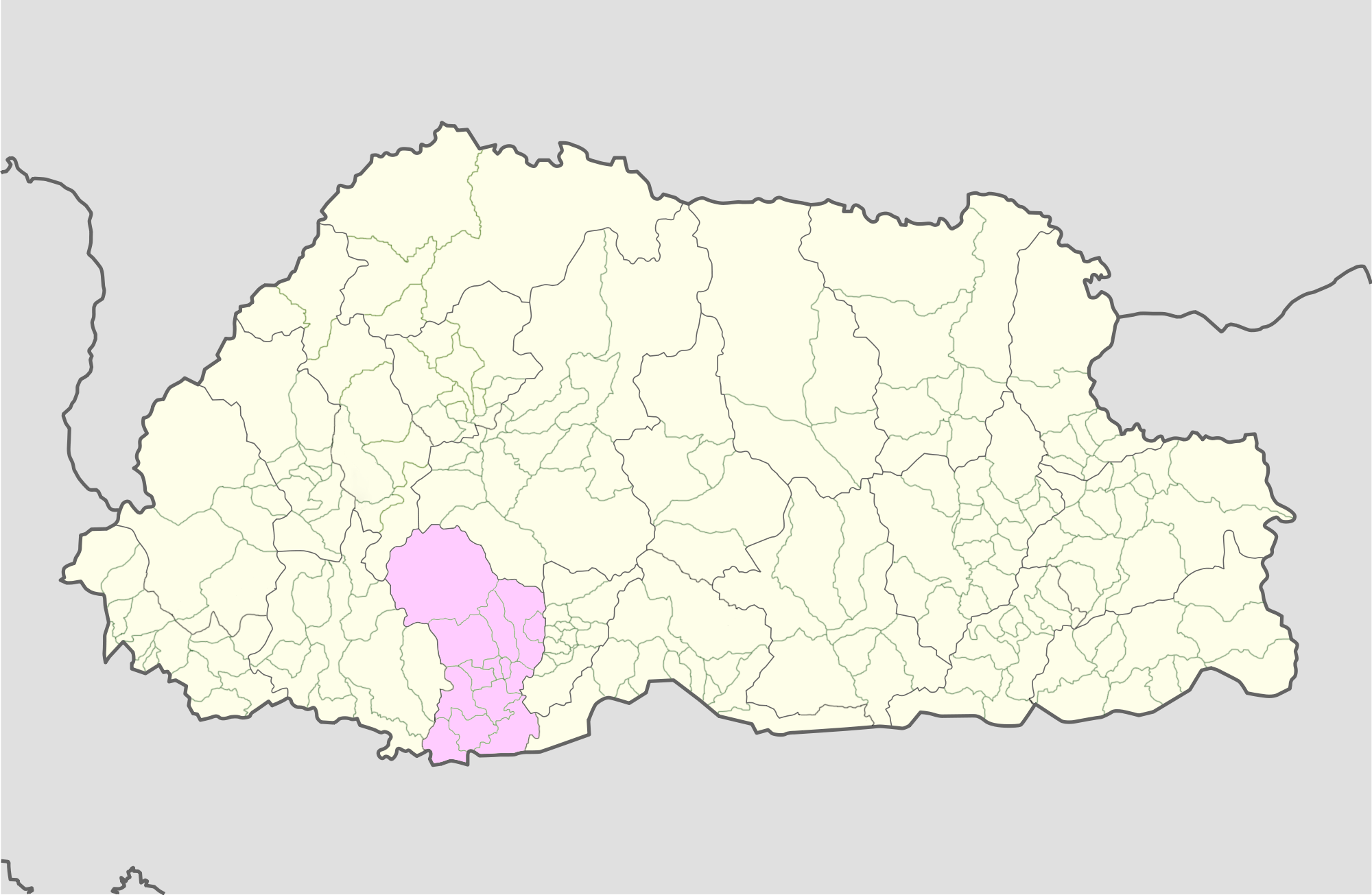
- Location within Dagana District
- Coordinates: 27°00′00″N 89°49′47″E
- Country: Bhutan
- District: Dagana District

Government
  - Gup: Lhawang Dorji
- Time zone: UTC+6 (BTT)

Karna Gewog is a gewog (village block) of Dagana District, Bhutan.
