= Razawog =

Razawog ར་ཛ་འོག
- Location in Bhutan
- Coordinates: 27°32′N 90°6′E
- Country: Bhutan
- District: Wangdue Phodrang District
- Village block: Nyisho Gewog
- Time zone: UTC+6 (BTT)

Razawog, (Note: also spelled Raza Wog, Radzawog, Rajawog or Razawok) is a village in Wangdue Phodrang District in central Bhutan.
