= Zhongmaed =

Zhongmaed གཞོང་སྨད
- Town
- Location in Bhutan
- Coordinates: 27°32′N 91°3′E
- Country: Bhutan
- District: Lhuntse District
- Village block: Metsho Gewog
- Time zone: UTC+6 (BTT)

Zhongmaed is a town in Lhuntse District in northeastern Bhutan.
