= Shokang =

Shokang ཤོ་བཀའ
- Village
- Location in Bhutan
- Coordinates: 27°21′N 91°30′E
- Country: Bhutan
- District: Trashigang District
- Village block: Yangnyer Gewog
- Time zone: UTC+6 (BTT)

Shokang is a village in Trashigang District in eastern Bhutan.
