= Togtokha, Paro =

Togtokha Totokha
- Location in Bhutan
- Coordinates: 27°18′N 89°32′E
- Country: Bhutan
- District: Paro District
- Village block: Dokar Gewog
- Time zone: UTC+6 (BTT)

Totogkha is a hamlet in Paro District in western Bhutan.
