= Banjar, Bhutan =

Banjar བན་སྦྱར
- Location in Bhutan
- Coordinates: 27°23′N 91°10′E
- Country: Bhutan
- District: Mongar District
- Village block: Tsamang Gewog
- Time zone: UTC+6 (BTT)

Banjar is a town in Mongar District in northeastern Bhutan.
