= Tshaluna =

- Location in Bhutan
- Coordinates: 27°27′N 89°31′E
- Country: Bhutan
- District: Thimphu District
- Village block: Mewang Gewog
- Elevation: 2,388 m (7,835 ft)

Tshaluna is a village in Thimphu District in central-western Bhutan. It lies at an altitude of 2388 metres.

== See also ==
- List of cities, towns and villages in Bhutan
