= Hlari =

- Location in Bhutan
- Coordinates: 27°24′N 88°59′E
- Country: Bhutan
- District: Haa District
- Time zone: UTC+6 (BTT)

Hlari is a town in Haa District in southwestern Bhutan.
