= Saling, Trashigang =

Saling ས་གླིང
- Location in Bhutan
- Coordinates: 27°22.3′N 91°40.3′E
- Country: Bhutan
- District: Trashigang District
- Village block: Bidung Gewog
- Time zone: UTC+6 (BTT)

Saling is a village in Trashigang District in eastern Bhutan.
