= Haragangkha =

- Location in Bhutan
- Coordinates: 27°12′7.35″N 90°6′33.09″E
- Country: Bhutan
- District: Wangdue Phodrang District
- Village block: Athang Gewog
- Time zone: UTC+6 (BTT)

Haragangkha is a village in Wangdue Phodrang District in central Bhutan.
