= Kidekhar =

Kidekhar སྐྱིད་བདེ་མཁར
- Town
- Location in Bhutan
- Coordinates: 27°16′N 91°16′E
- Country: Bhutan
- District: Mongar District
- Village block: Mongar Gewog
- Time zone: UTC+6 (BTT)

Kidekhar (Note: also spelled Kyidekhar, Kidheykhar, Keydaykhar, Kidhekhar, Kidikhar or Kilikhar) is a town in Mongar District in southeastern-central Bhutan.
