= Dolepchen =

- Location in Bhutan
- Coordinates: 26°58′N 89°23′E
- Country: Bhutan
- District: Chukha District
- Sub-district: Phuentsholing Dungkhag
- Village block: Logchina Gewog
- Time zone: UTC+6 (BTT)

Dolepchen is a village in Chukha District in southwestern Bhutan.
