= Ketokha =

Ketokha སྐེད་ཏོག་ཁ Ketogkha, Khitokha
- Location in Bhutan
- Coordinates: 26°54′N 89°37′E
- Country: Bhutan
- District: Chukha District
- Village block: Bongo Gewog
- Time zone: UTC+6 (BTT)

Ketokha also spelled Ketogkha or Khitokha, is a town in Chukha District in southwestern Bhutan.
