= Nimshong =

Nimshong Nyimzhong
- Location in Bhutan
- Coordinates: 27°10.25′N 90°55.4′E
- Country: Bhutan
- District: Mongar District
- Village block: Shingkhar Gewog
- Time zone: UTC+6 (BTT)

Nimshong is a village in Zhemgang District in southeastern-central Bhutan.
