= Tingma =

Tingma ཏིང་མ
- Village
- Location in Bhutan
- Coordinates: 27°10.7′N 89°2.8′E
- Country: Bhutan
- District: Haa District
- Village block: Sangbay Gewog
- Time zone: UTC+6 (BTT)

Tingma is a village in Haa District in southwestern Bhutan.
