= Tshenzabi =

Tshenzabi བཙན་ཟ་སྦིས Tsenzabi
- Village
- Location in Bhutan
- Coordinates: 27°15′N 91°10′E
- Country: Bhutan
- District: Mongar District
- Village block: Saling Gewog
- Time zone: UTC+6 (BTT)

Tshenzabi is a village in Mongar District in southeastern-central Bhutan.
