= Rashigang =

Rashigang རང་བཞིན་སྒང
- Village
- Location in Bhutan
- Coordinates: 27°14′N 89°27′E
- Country: Bhutan
- District: Paro District
- Village block: Naja Gewog
- Time zone: UTC+6 (BTT)

Rashigang (Note: also spelled as Razhingang, Rangzhigang, Rangzhingang, Rangshigang, Rangzhin-Gang) is a village in Paro District in western Bhutan.
