= Dragchhu =

Dragchhu Tirkhola
- Location in Bhutan
- Coordinates: 27°3′N 90°18′E
- Country: Bhutan
- District: Sarpang District
- Village block: Chhudzom Gewog
- Time zone: UTC+6 (BTT)

Dragchhu (Formerly Tirkhola) is a town in Sarpang District in southern Bhutan.
