= Drujegang Gewog =

- Gewog
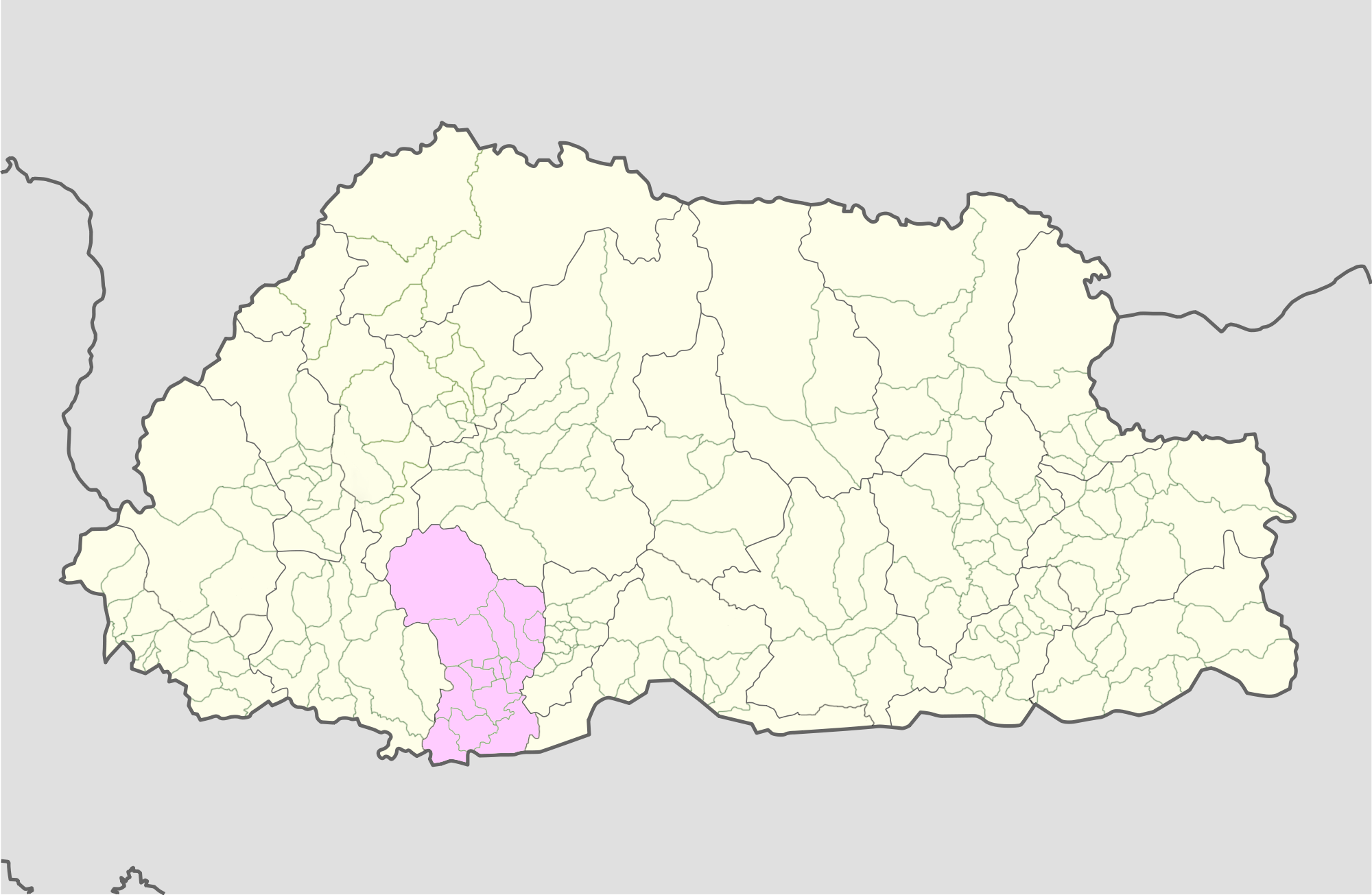
- Location within Dagana District
- Coordinates: 26°57′00″N 90°02′00″E
- Country: Bhutan
- District: Dagana District
- Time zone: UTC+6 (BTT)

Drujegang Gewog is a gewog (village block) of Dagana District, Bhutan. Drukgyegang is one of the villages of the district.

Jurmi Wangchuk is a Bhutanese politician who has been a member of the National Assembly of Bhutan, since October 2018.
