= Phibsoo =

Wangchulingkhar Phibsoo, Phisugaon
- Location in Bhutan
- Coordinates: 26°45′N 90°6′E
- Country: Bhutan
- District: Sarpang District
- Village block: Senghe Gewog
- Time zone: UTC+6 (BTT)

Phibsoo, offically Wangchulingkhar is a town in Sarpang District in southern Bhutan, bordering Assam, India. The area is primarily inhabited by Lhotshampa people.
