= Khailog, Khamaed =

Khailog ཁའི་ལོག Goen Khailo
- Location in Bhutan
- Coordinates: 27°45′N 89°43′E
- Country: Bhutan
- District: Gasa District
- Village block: Khamaed Gewog
- Time zone: UTC+6 (BTT)

Khailog is a town in Gasa District in northwestern Bhutan.
