= Shana, Bhutan =

Shana ཤ་ན
- Location in Bhutan
- Coordinates: 27°37′N 89°16′E
- Country: Bhutan
- District: Paro District
- Village block: Tsento Gewog
- Time zone: UTC+6 (BTT)

Shana is a village in Paro District in western Bhutan.
