= Ney, Bhutan =

Ney གནས
- Location in Bhutan
- Coordinates: 27°47′N 91°04.4′E
- Country: Bhutan
- District: Lhuntse District
- Village block: Gangzur Gewog
- Time zone: UTC+6 (BTT)

Ney is a village in Lhuntse District in northeastern Bhutan.
