= Samtenling Gewog =

Samtenling Gewog བསམ་གཏན་གླིང་
- Gewog
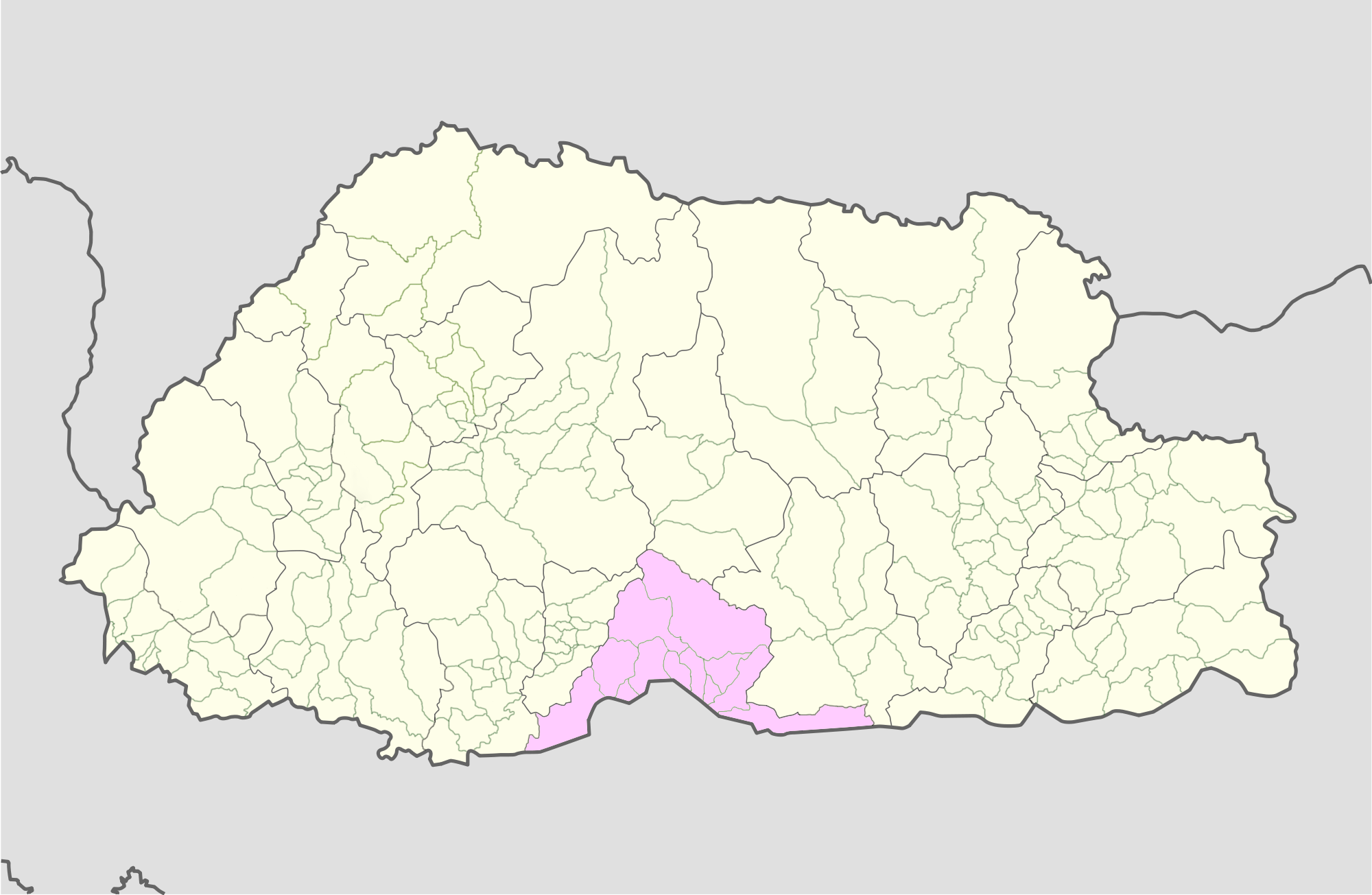
- Country: Bhutan
- District: Sarpang District
- Time zone: UTC+6 (BTT)

Samtenling Gewog (Dzongkha: བསམ་གཏན་གླིང་) is a gewog (village block) of Sarpang District, Bhutan.
