= Gyalgong =

- Location in Bhutan
- Coordinates: 27°4′N 91°4′E
- Country: Bhutan
- District: Mongar District
- Village block: Silambi Gewog
- Time zone: UTC+6 (BTT)

Gyalgong is a village in the Mongar District in southeastern-central Bhutan.
