= Khebisa Gewog =

- Gewog
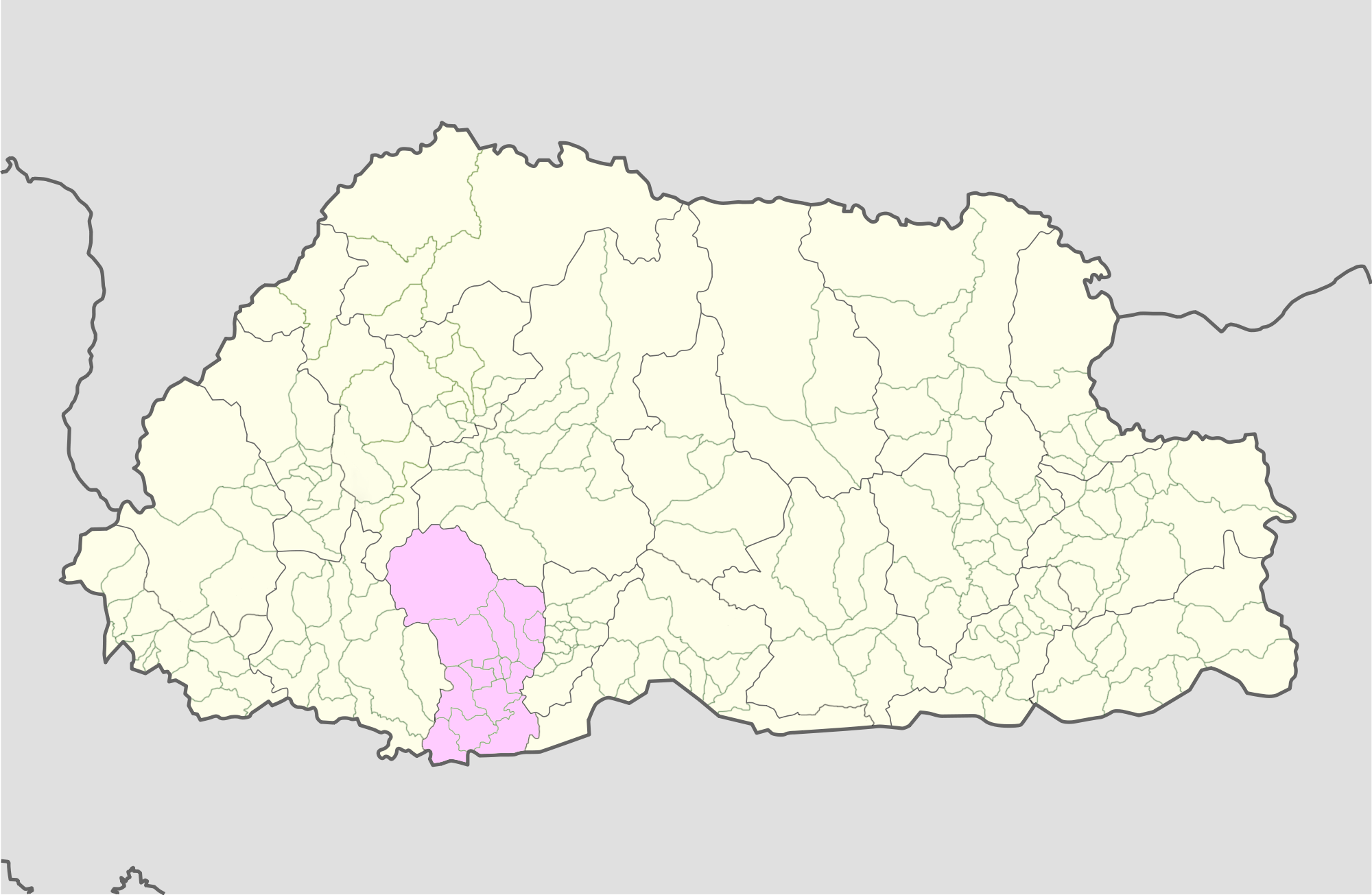
- Location within Dagana District
- Coordinates: 27°02′00″N 89°57′00″E
- Country: Bhutan
- District: Dagana District
- Time zone: UTC+6 (BTT)

Khebisa Gewog is a gewog (village block) of Dagana District, Bhutan.
