= Damji, Bhutan =

Damji དྭངསམ་སྦྱིས Damjee
- Village
- Location in Bhutan
- Coordinates: 27°48′N 89°38′E
- Country: Bhutan
- District: Gasa District
- Village block: Khamaed Gewog
- Time zone: UTC+6 (BTT)

Damji is a village in Gasa District in northwestern Bhutan.
