= Shari, Bhutan =

Shar-ri ཤར་རི Shari
- Village
- Location in Bhutan
- Coordinates: 27°16.2′N 89°19′E
- Country: Bhutan
- District: Haa District
- Village block: Samar Gewog
- Time zone: UTC+6 (BTT)

Shari is a village in Haa District in southwestern Bhutan.
