= Dangchu =

- Village
- Location in Bhutan
- Coordinates: 27°38′N 90°11′E
- Country: Bhutan
- District: Wangdue Phodrang District
- Time zone: UTC+6 (BTT)

Dangchu is a town in Wangdue Phodrang District in central Bhutan.
