= Chhiya =

Chhiya ཕྱི་ཡ Chiya, Cheya
- Village
- Location in Bhutan
- Coordinates: 27°13′N 91°28′E
- Country: Bhutan
- District: Trashigang District
- Village block: Udzorong Gewog
- Time zone: UTC+6 (BTT)

Chhiya is a village in Trashigang District in eastern Bhutan.
