= Lhayuel =

Lhayuel ལྷ་གཡུལ Mougaon
- Location in Bhutan
- Coordinates: 27°2′N 90°24′E
- Country: Bhutan
- District: Sarpang District
- Village block: Chhudzom Gewog
- Time zone: UTC+6 (BTT)

Lhayuel, formerly Mougaon, is a town in Sarpang District in southern Bhutan.
