= Shawa, Bhutan =

Town in Lhuntse District in northeastern Bhutan

Shawa ཤཝ
- Location in Bhutan
- Coordinates: 27°46.4′N 91°9.7′E
- Country: Bhutan
- District: Lhuntse District
- Village block: Gangzur Gewog
- Time zone: UTC+6 (BTT)

Shawa is a town in Lhuntse District in northeastern Bhutan.
