= Tsendagang Gewog =

- Gewog
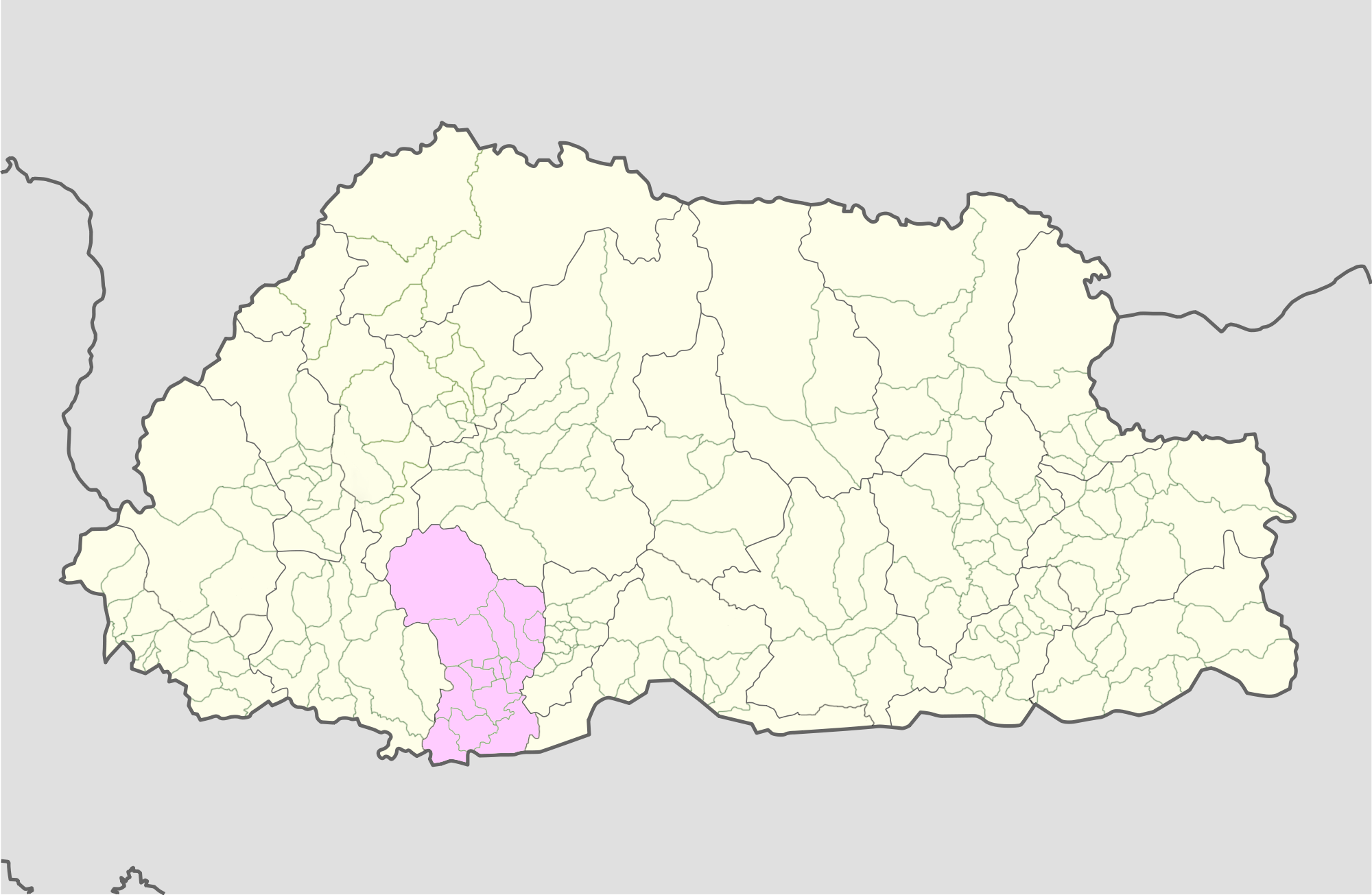
- Location within Dagana District
- Coordinates: 26°52′30″N 89°55′00″E
- Country: Bhutan
- District: Dagana District
- Time zone: UTC+6 (BTT)

Tsendagang Gewog is a gewog (village block) of Dagana District, Bhutan.
