= Galegchhu =

Galegchhu Galechugaon
- Location in Bhutan
- Coordinates: 27°0′N 90°32′E
- Country: Bhutan
- District: Sarpang District
- Village block: Jigmechhoeling Gewog
- Time zone: UTC+6 (BTT)

Galegchhu also spelled Galeychu, is a town in Sarpang District in southern Bhutan.
