= Sawang, Bhutan =

Sawang
- Location in Bhutan
- Coordinates: 26°59.7′N 91°33.4′E
- Country: Bhutan
- District: Samdrup Jongkhar District
- Village block: Gomdar Gewog
- Time zone: UTC+6 (BTT)

Sawang is a village in Samdrup Jongkhar in southeastern Bhutan.
