= Thragom =

Thragom ཁྲ་སྒོམ
- Village
- Location in Bhutan
- Coordinates: 27°26.4′N 91°38.4′E
- Country: Bhutan
- District: Trashiyangtse District
- Village block: Yalang Gewog
- Time zone: UTC+6 (BTT)

Thragom is a village in Trashiyangtse District in eastern Bhutan.
