= Romang, Bhutan =

Romang
- Location in Bhutan
- Coordinates: 27°24′N 91°34′E
- Country: Bhutan
- District: Trashigang District
- Village block: Ramjar Gewog
- Time zone: UTC+6 (BTT)

Romang is a village in Trashigang District in eastern Bhutan. It has an elevation of 1,650m above sea level.
