= Chuyul =

- Location in Bhutan
- Coordinates: 27°32′N 89°18′E
- Country: Bhutan
- District: Paro District
- Village block: Tsento Gewog
- Time zone: UTC+6 (BTT)

Chuyul is a town in Paro District in western Bhutan.
