= Nangar =

Nangar ནང་སྒར
- Village
- Location in Bhutan
- Coordinates: 27°30′N 90°45′E
- Country: Bhutan
- District: Bumthang District
- Village block: Chhoekhor Gewog
- Time zone: UTC+6 (BTT)

Nangar is a village in Bumthang District in central Bhutan.
