= Chapcha Gewog =

Chapcha Gewog སྐྱབས་ཆ་
- Gewogs
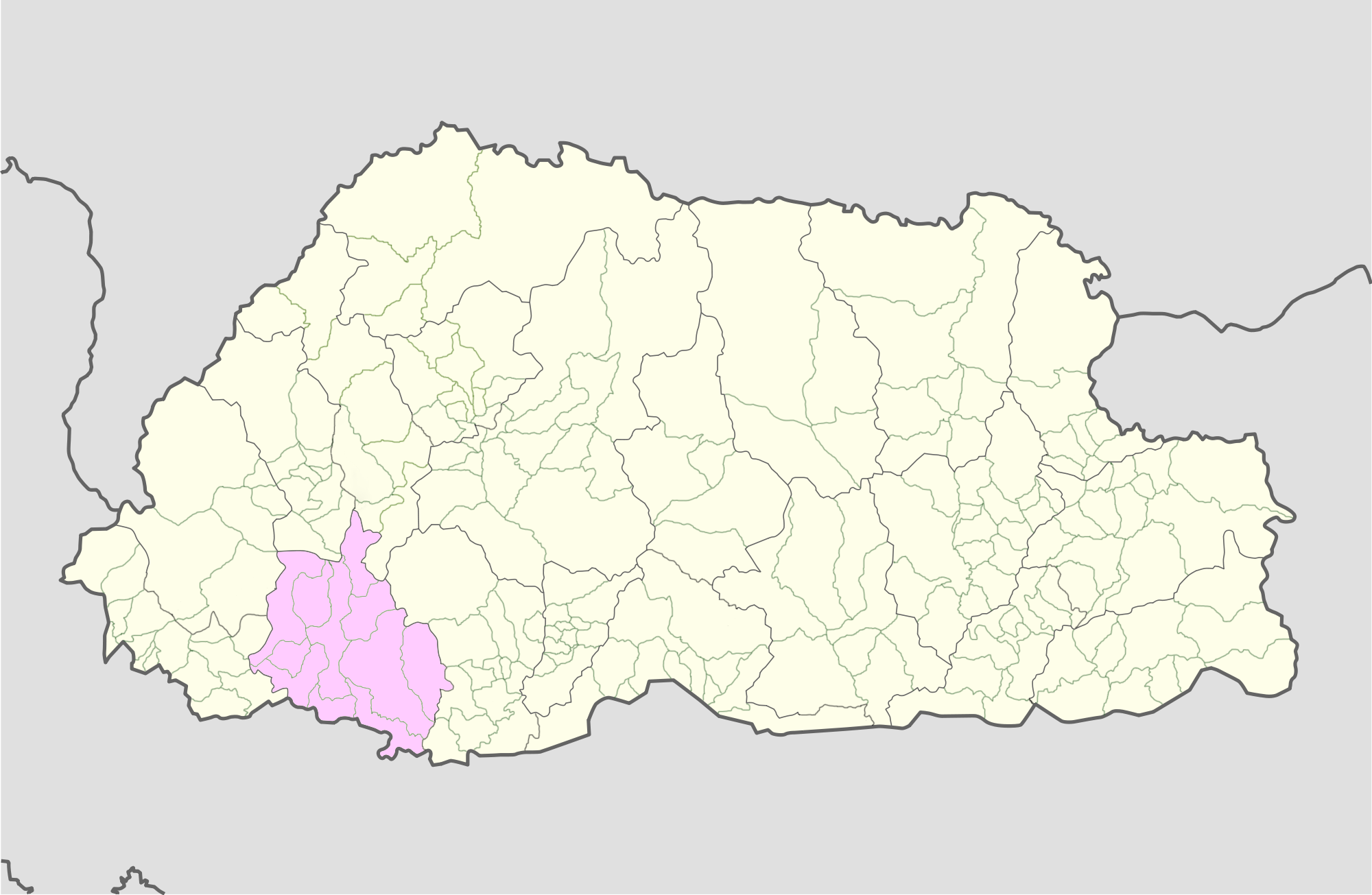
- Location within Chukha District
- Coordinates: 27°11′36″N 89°32′16″E
- Country: Bhutan
- District: Chukha District

Area
  - Total: 43.5 sq mi (112.6 km^{2})
- Time zone: UTC+6 (BTT)

Chapcha Gewog (Dzongkha: སྐྱབས་ཆ་,Chaapchha Gewog) is a gewog (village block) of Chukha District, Bhutan. The 112.6-km² gewog contains 11 villages. Chapcha has a population of 4,400 in 386 households. Ngalop is the main ethnicity.

== Education ==
Chapcha has 6 schools, including 4 community schools.

== Settlements ==
- Chapchha
