= Sangkiri =

Sangkiri གསང་ཀི་རི
- Location in Bhutan
- Coordinates: 27°19.7′N 89°18.6′E
- Country: Bhutan
- District: Haa District
- Village block: Uesu Gewog
- Time zone: UTC+6 (BTT)

Sangkiri, also spelled Sangkeri, is a village in Haa District in southwestern Bhutan.
