= Changmey =

- Location in Bhutan
- Coordinates: 27°21′N 91°40′E
- Country: Bhutan
- District: Trashigang District
- Village block: Shongphoog Gewog
- Time zone: UTC+6 (BTT)

Changmey, also spelled Chhangmi, is a town in Trashigang District in eastern Bhutan.
