= Rimtakha =

Rimtakha རིམ་སྟེ་ཁ Rimthangkha, Rimtangkha, Chabrimtekha
- Village
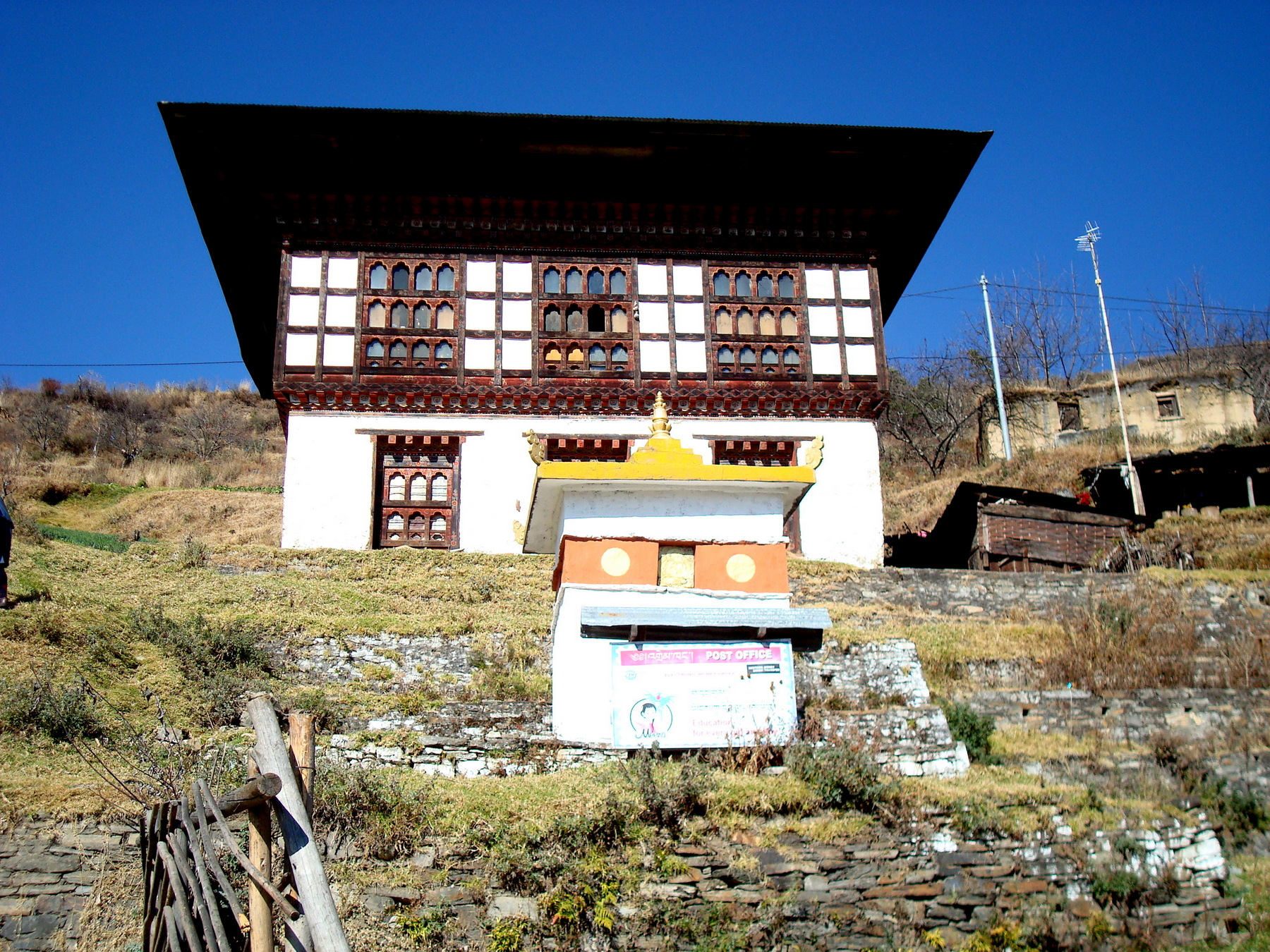
- Community mail office in traditional farmer's house

- Location in Bhutan
- Coordinates: 27°12′N 89°33′E
- Country: Bhutan
- District: Chukha District
- Village block: Chapcha Gewog
- Time zone: UTC+6 (BTT)

Rimtakha is a village in Chukha District in northern Bhutan.
