= Jiri, Bhutan =

Jiri
- Location in Bhutan
- Coordinates: 27°13′N 91°30′E
- Country: Bhutan
- District: Trashigang District
- Village block: Khaling Gewog
- Time zone: UTC+6 (BTT)

Jiri also spelled Jeri, is a town in Trashigang District in eastern Bhutan.
