= Naktshang =

- Location in Bhutan
- Coordinates: 27°23′N 89°16′E
- Country: Bhutan
- District: Haa District
- Village block: Katsho Gewog
- Time zone: UTC+6 (BTT)

Naktshang is a village nearby Haa, Haa District in southwestern Bhutan.
