= Chendebji =

Chendebji ཅན་དན་སྦྱིས།
- Location in Bhutan
- Coordinates: 27°29′11.44″N 90°20′7.48″E
- Country: Bhutan
- District: Trongsa District
- Village block: Tangsibji Gewog
- Time zone: UTC+6 (BTT)

Chendebji (Dzongkha: ཅན་དན་སྦྱིས།) also spelled Chendenbji is a village in Trongsa District in central Bhutan. Chendebji means the 'Valley of Cypress' with 'Chenden' meaning cypress, and 'bji' ground or valley. It is located at the conflunce of the Khebachu and Maleychhu.

Chendebji Chorten is located nearby.
