= Nasiphel =

Nasiphel སྣང་སྲིད་འཕེལ Nangsiphel, Naspe
- Location in Bhutan
- Coordinates: 27°41′N 90°43′E
- Country: Bhutan
- District: Bumthang District
- Village block: Chhoekhor Gewog
- Time zone: UTC+6 (BTT)

Nasiphel, also spelled Nangsiphel or Naspe, is a village in Bumthang District in central Bhutan.
