= Rithangwog =

- Location in Bhutan
- Coordinates: 27°33′N 90°10′E
- Country: Bhutan
- District: Wangdue Phodrang District
- Village block: Dangchu Gewog
- Time zone: UTC+6 (BTT)

Rithangwog (Note: also known as Rethangwog, Ridha, Rida, Ridag, and Ritang) is a village in Wangdue Phodrang District in central-northern Bhutan.
