= Yalang =

Yalang ཡ་ལངས
- Village
- Location in Bhutan
- Coordinates: 27°26′N 91°36′E
- Country: Bhutan
- District: Trashiyangtse District
- Village block: Yalang Gewog
- Time zone: UTC+6 (BTT)

Yalang is a village in Trashiyangtse District in eastern Bhutan.
