= Shayuel =

Shayuel ཤ་ཡུལ
- Village
- Location in Bhutan
- Coordinates: 27°52.8′N 89°25′E
- Country: Bhutan
- District: Thimphu District
- Sub-district: Lingzhi Dungkhag
- Village block: Lingzhi Gewog
- Time zone: UTC+6 (BTT)

Shayuel is a village in Thimphu District in western Bhutan.
