= Dagapela =

Settlement in the south of Bhutan

Dagapela Norbuzhingkha, Panakhola
- Town
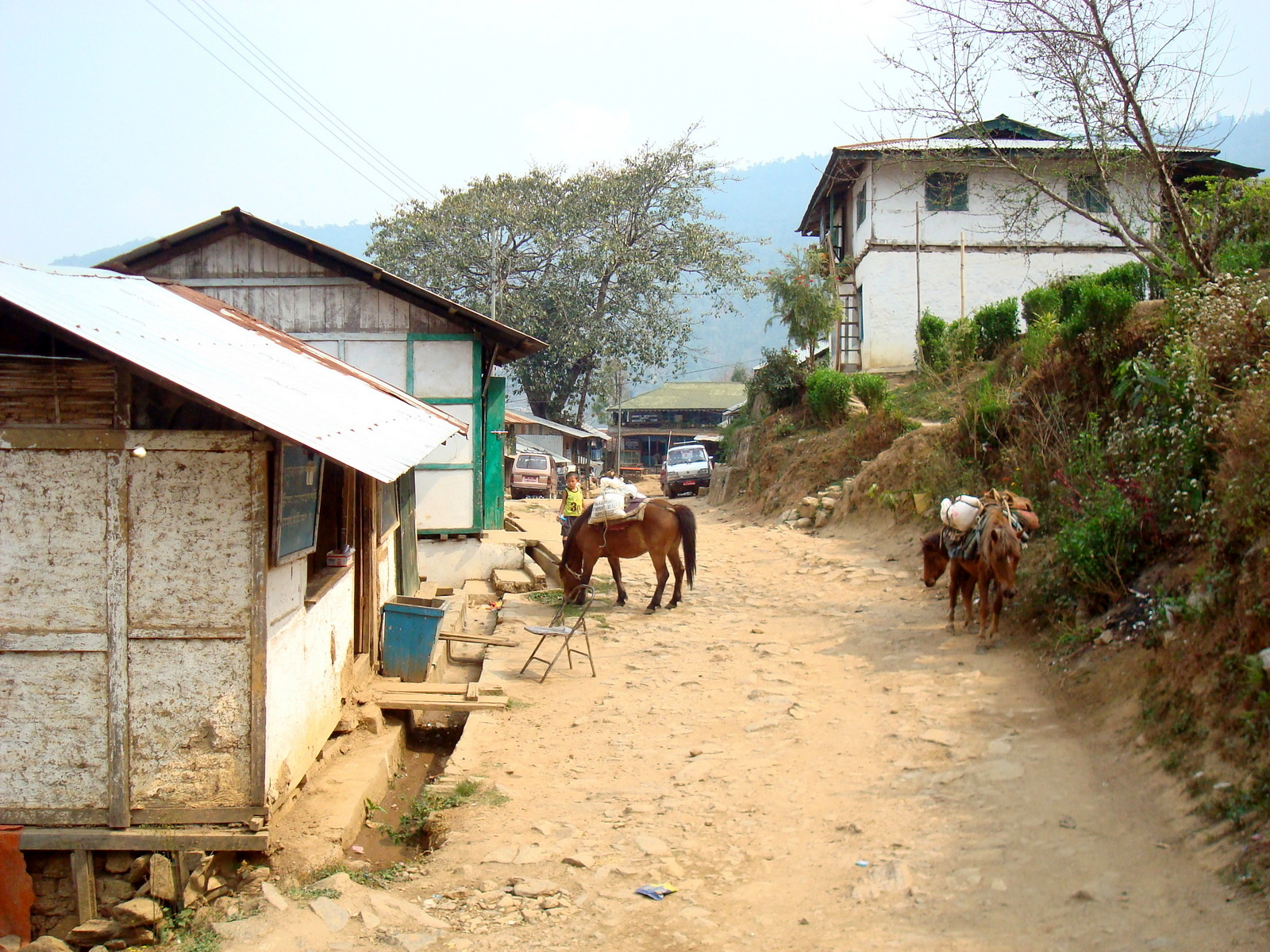
- View of Dagapela

- Location in Bhutan
- Coordinates: 26°56′5″N 89°57′29″E
- Country: Bhutan
- District: Dagana District
- Village block: Tsendagang Gewog

Population (2005)
  - Total: 145

Dagapela is a settlement in the south of Bhutan. It is located in Dagana District, to the southeast of the town of Dagana. At the 2005 census, its population was 145.
