= Kharsa =

Kharsa མཁར་ས
- Location in Bhutan
- Coordinates: 27°37.7′N 90°42.9′E
- Country: Bhutan
- District: Bumthang District
- Village block: Chhoekhor Gewog
- Time zone: UTC+6 (BTT)

Kharsa is a village in Bumthang District in central Bhutan.
