= Darkar Gewog =

Darkar Gewog དར་དཀར་
- Gewog
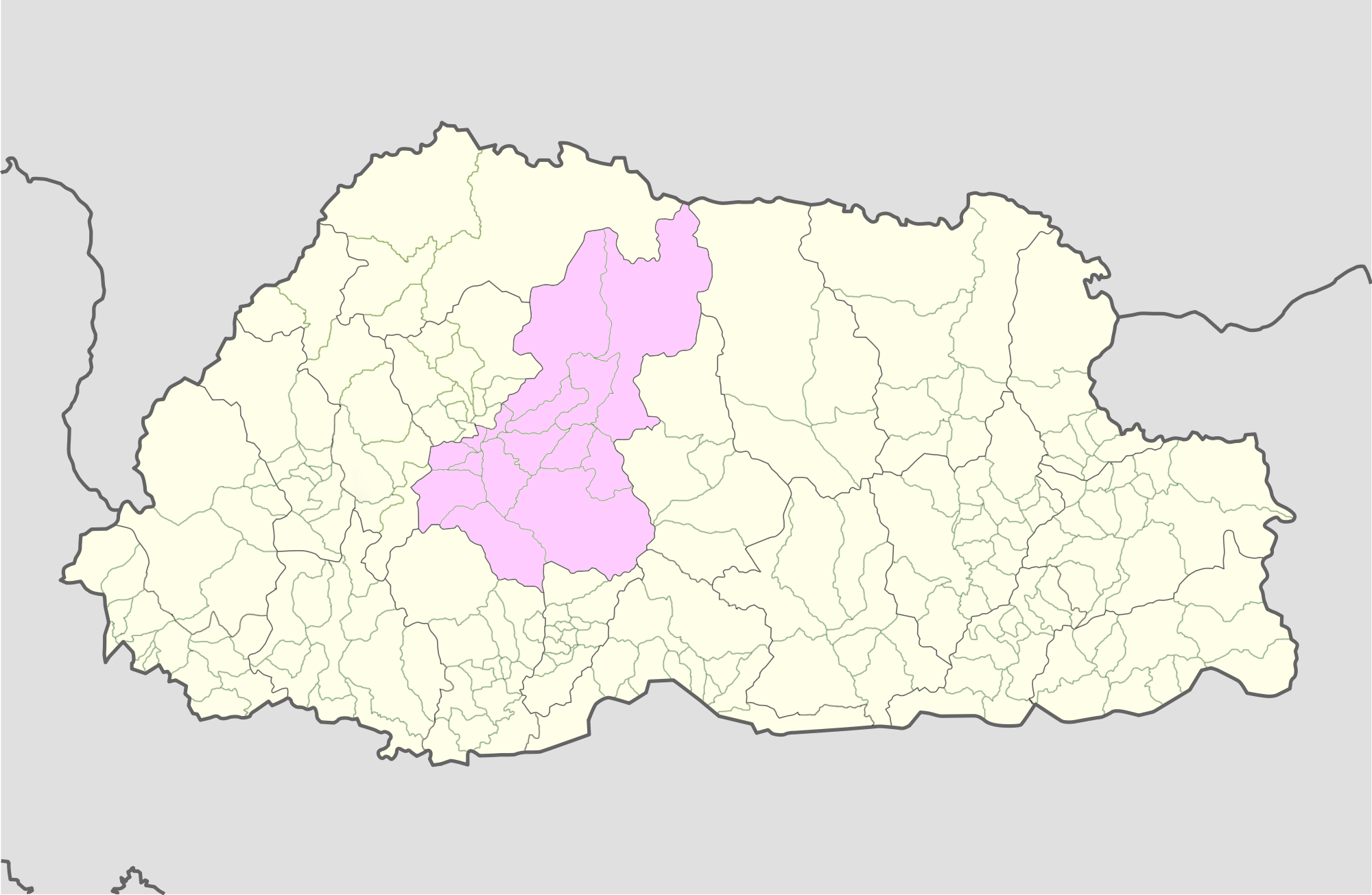
- Country: Bhutan
- District: Wangdue Phodrang District
- Time zone: UTC+6 (BTT)

Darkar Gewog (Dzongkha: དར་དཀར་), formerly known as Daga, is a gewog (village block) of Wangdue Phodrang District, Bhutan.
