= Chhubar =

Chhubar ཆུ་བར Chubar
- Village
- Location in Bhutan
- Coordinates: 27°29′17″N 89°25′55″E
- Country: Bhutan
- District: Paro District
- Village block: Doteng Gewog
- Time zone: UTC+6 (BTT)

Chhubar is a village in Paro District in western Bhutan.
