= Pachu, Bhutan =

Pachu སྤ་ཆུ Pachhugang, Pachhudrag, Pachhuthang
- Location in Bhutan
- Coordinates: 26°54′N 89°21′E
- Country: Bhutan
- District: Chukha District
- Village block: Phuentsholing Gewog
- Elevation: 2,153 ft (656 m)
- Time zone: UTC+6 (BTT)

Pachu, (Note: Formerly Balden Dara, Pachu Dara, or Pachhu Tar) is a town in Chukha District in southwestern Bhutan.
