= Kangpar Gewog =

Kangpara རྐང་པར་
- Gewogs of Bhutan
- Interactive map of Kangpara
- Districts of Bhutan: Trashigang District
- Time zone: UTC+6 (Bhutan Time)

Kangpar Gewog (Dzongkha: རྐང་པར་) is a gewog (village block) of Trashigang District, Bhutan. Kangpara Gewog, along with Thrimshing Gewog, comprises Thrimshing Dungkhag (sub-district). Kangpara is one of the remotest gewogs under Trashigang Dzongkhag (district). The gewog is 341.9 square kilometers and shares borders with other gewogs like Gomdar, Thrimshing, Shongphu, Khaling, Shingkhar Lauri and Merak. Kangpara is popular for housing some sacred monasteries like Lamai Goenpa, Sikhar Goenpa et al., and is also popular for their belief in deities like Ama Jomo and Meme Dangling.

== The origin of the name ==
The word "Kangpara" literally means "footprint." There are footprints of Lord Buddha in a hermitage. According to oral sources, the footprints were said to be carved by a great lama Drupthob Dong-nga Rinchen. He visited Bodh Gaya and on his return, brought with him imprints of Lord Buddha's footprints. Using them as a model, he carved the footprints on a stone in the hermitage. It is considered by the people as one of the most sacred relics of the lhakhang along with the Drupthob's walking cane.

== Demography ==
According to Trashigang Dzongkhag's official website, Kangpara Gewog has a total population of 3824 and has about 347 households. The gewog houses about 17 villages and some of the major villages are Pasaphu, Paydung, Madewa, Kangpara, Kheri, Kheshing, Wangthang, Lamyong, Rebaling, Gorapey, Brumshari, Churphu, Neiling, Bedingphu, Sarong, Merda, Gorenchenma, Zordung and Threlphu.

== Administration and politics ==
As of December 2011, the head of the gewog or "gup" is Chempa Dorji and the Gewog Administration Officer is Sonam Wangdi. They have their offices in Woongthung, near Kangpara Lower Secondary School. Apart from the gup and Gewog Administration Officer, the gewog like every other gewog has a Mangi and Tshogpas to look after the affairs of the people and actively participate in the democratic process. In the 2008 democratic election, Kangpara and Thrimshing (one constituency) elected Choki Wangmo as their MP and the win was a landslide. Ever since then, she has been representing the people of Kangpara and Thrimshing in the Parliament of Bhutan. Similarly, during Bhutan's first National Council election, Sonam Kinga from Galing was declared the winner and he has been representing Kangpara gewog along with 14 more gewogs of Trashigang in the National Council ever since.

== Recent Changes ==
Until recent years, the gewog was largely secluded from other parts of the country and was tucked away in picturesque mountains and virgin forests. It had no amenities other than a few schools and health clinics. However, starting from a five or six years ago, the people of the gewog saw unprecedented changes and developments. It all started with the electrification of almost all the villages in the gewog. A couple of years later, one of the primary schools was upgraded to a lower secondary school, removing parents' burden of sending their children after the 6th grade for schooling to Thungkhar Lower Secondary School, which is a day's walk from Kangpara. The gewog has approximately 4 schools, namely, Kangpara Lower Secondary School, Pasaphu Primary School, Threlphu Community School and Zordung Community School. The connecting of the gewog to the mobile was another unprecedented change; the accessibility of the mobile means that farmers of the gewog can keep up-to-date with their relatives and alike who stay in different parts of the country, mostly as civil servants. Besides, a farm road is on its way to the gewog and will reach there by next year or so. The farm road will prevent people from walking six hours to reach the nearest road and will benefit around 400 households of Kangpara. The alignment of the road has fueled some controversy over the past years and has greatly delayed the work; however, many thought the present alignment was the best option and would benefit more households than the previous alignment, and this could have been the main reason why the road was realigned.

== Lifestyle, occupation, and activities ==
The people of Kangpara along with the people of Kheng are renowned throughout the country for their unparalleled craftsmanship. The most exquisite handicraft product the artisans produce is called "Bangchung". The raw material used to make handicrafts like Bangchung is called "Ringshu" (Neomicrocalamus and ropogonifolius), which they fetch in bulk from places like Remung, under Orong Gewog, S/Jongkhar. Handicrafts are a major source of income for the people of Kangpara, and they market their finished products to other parts of the country in exchange for hard currency. The connecting of the farm road to the gewog is likely to further ease artisans of the gewog in fetching raw materials and transporting their finished products. Almost all denizens of the gewog are subsistence farmers and, until recently, barter played a significant role among the people and, to a lesser extent, it is still prevalent. Farmers cultivate crops like chillies, paddy and maize, of which, chillies are essentially cultivated to earn some cash income and the latter two for domestic consumption. They use ponies as a means of transportation to sell their products to the market, and therefore, it is no accident that almost every household owns a pony or mule each. Also, a relatively small percentage of the population, precisely in the north, are nomads and livestock farming plays a dominant role in their everyday life; for them, livestock and livestock products are the only means where-through they can scrape out a living.

== Lamai Goenpa ==
The Origin of Lamai Goenpa dates back to the time of Tibetan Prince Lhasay Tsangma, sometimes in the 10th Century (???). The hermitage was in-between a cliff - not at the present site, perched spectacularly viewing three villages-Zordung, Kangpara and Bedingphu. The story of the remains of the hermitage is little known by the surrounding people. However, the present monastery, actually named as Lhundrup SamtenCholing, popularly known as Lamai Goenpa still, is located some 100 meters away from the past location, beyond a ridge of the Tshephu cliff. It is surrounded by Chenla, a mountain pass which is considered to be the most sacred and must-visit pilgrimage spot in the area. It was built by Lopoen Melam Rabzang in 1930, and he was originally from Tangsibi in Trongsa. According to a source, he was a disciple of Togden Shakya Shri (a great practitioner of Drukpa Kagyu, well known for his mastery in Dzogchen) and was predestined to pursue Naro Choedruk (Six profound practices of Naropa). The funding for the construction of the monastery came from no other than the most popular Dzongpon (governor) of Trashigang, Sey Dopola, who, according to a source, is the paternal great-grandfather of Queen consort Ashi Jetsun Pema Wangchuck. Upon the demise of Lama Melam Rabzang in 1945, the monastery is said to have lacked strong headship despite successive Lamas had been appointed. However, in 1986 H.E. Gyeltshen Trulku took over the charge and renovated the monastery. Today the hermitage houses around 40 monks/disciples, a Lama, and a couple of teachers.

Lamai Goenpa is a sacred hermitage in the region for housing a rare statue of Tshepamay in the heart of the mountain called Tshephu. Any visitor who stumbles upon a chance to visit Kangpara should not miss the privilege to visit the most sacred hermitage in the gewog. Her Majesty, the Queen Mother Ashi Dorji Wangmo Wangchuck visited the Goenpa in 2000.
