= Wolakha =

Wolakha ཝོ་ལ་ཁ
- Location in Bhutan
- Coordinates: 27°32′N 89°52.3′E
- Country: Bhutan
- District: Punakha District
- Village block: Guma Gewog
- Time zone: UTC+6 (BTT)

Wolakha is a village in Punakha District in Bhutan.
