= Tseza Gewog =

- Gewog
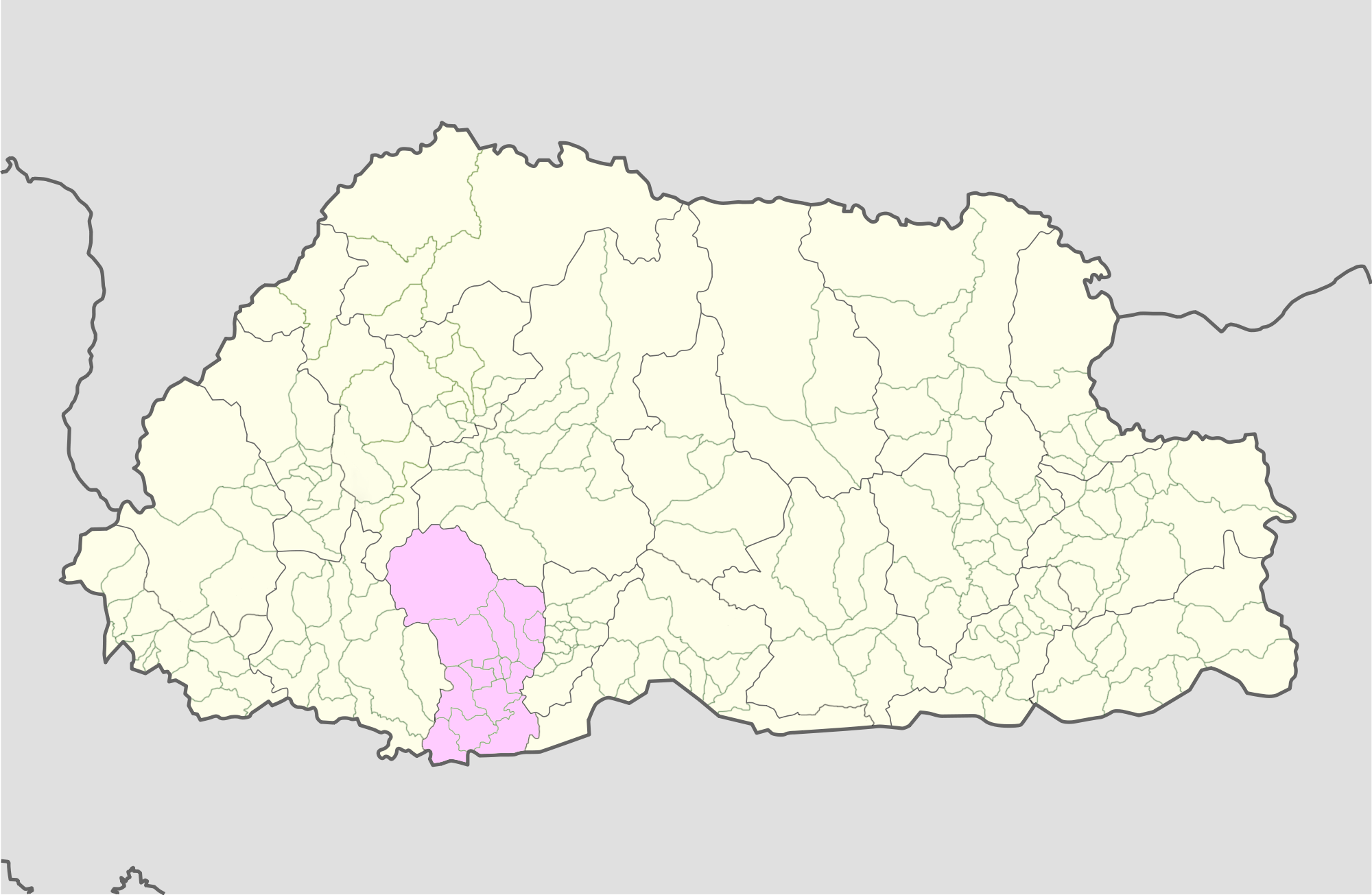
- Location within Dagana District
- Coordinates: 27°09′00″N 89°49′47″E
- Country: Bhutan
- District: Dagana District
- Time zone: UTC+6 (BTT)

Tseza Gewog is a gewog (village block) of Dagana District, Bhutan.

== Education ==
The Daga Central School, established in 1962, is one of the highest-education schools in the Dagana District.
