= Thrimshing Gewog =

Thrimshing Gewog ཁྲིམས་ཤིང་
- Gewog
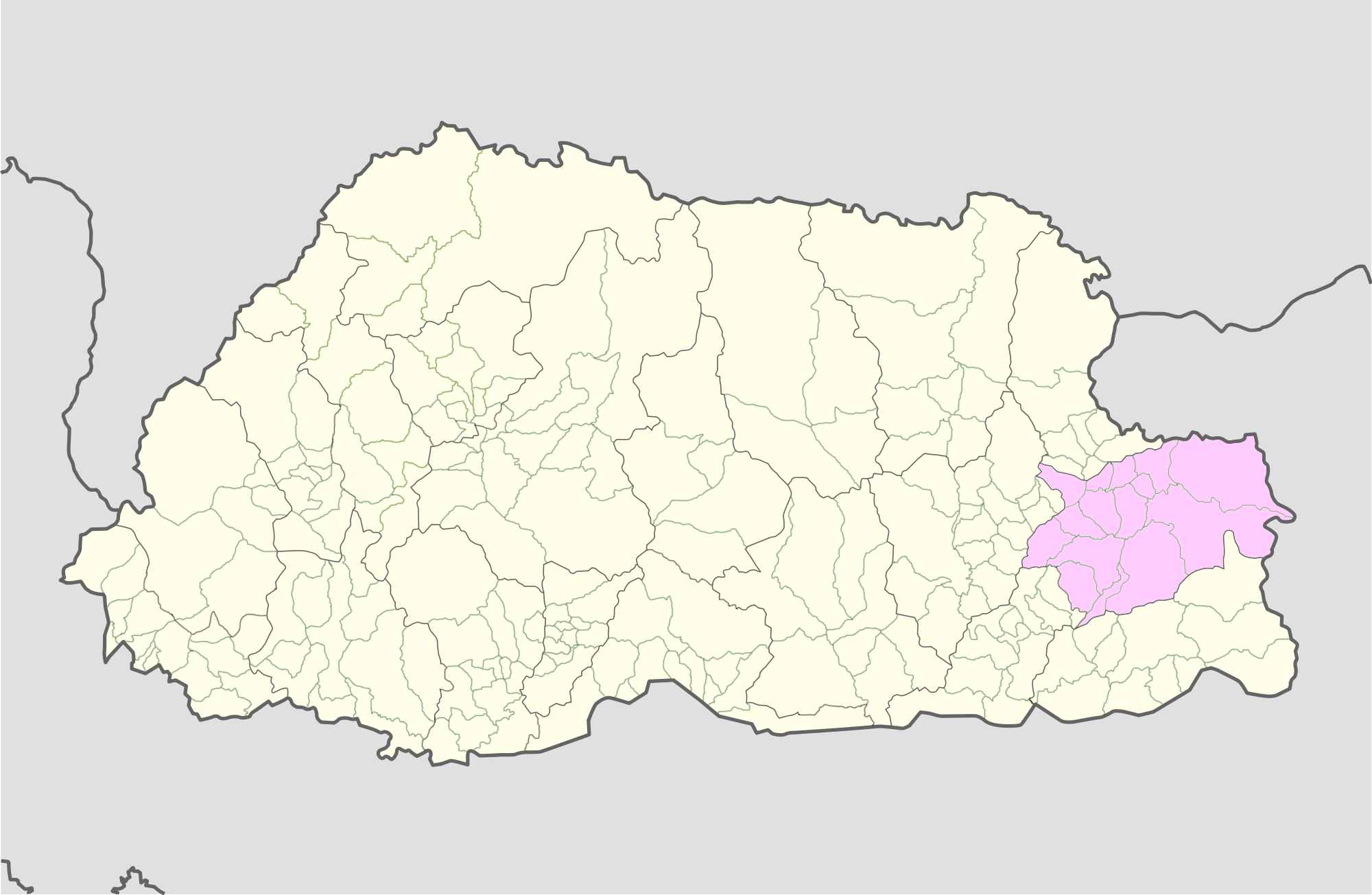
- Country: Bhutan
- District: Trashigang District
- Time zone: UTC+6 (BTT)

Thrimshing Gewog (Dzongkha: ཁྲིམས་ཤིང་) is a gewog (village block) of Trashigang District, Bhutan. Thrimshing Gewog, along with Kangpara Gewog, comprises Thrimshing Dungkhag (sub-district).

The education centres under Thrimshing Gewog include Thrimshing Central School, located in Thrimshing village, as well as Tsangpo Primary School, Phegpari Primary School, Thungkhar Primary School and Berdungma Primary School.

The 10-bed Tshangpo Hospital serves as the main medical centre, with primary healthcare facilities located in various villages.

The gewog is connected by a network of gewog centre roads and farm roads.
