= Kurtoe Gewog =

Coordinates: 27.8500°N 90.9667°E

Kurtoed Gewog ཀུར་སྟོད་མཁོལ་མ་
- Gewogs
- Interactive map of Kurtoed Gewog
- Country: Bhutan
- District: Lhuntse District
- Time zone: UTC+6 (BTT)

Kurtoed Gewog (Dzongkha: ཀུར་སྟོད་) is a gewog (village block) of Lhuntse District, Bhutan. It is inhabited by speakers of the Kurtöp language.
