= Dagana District =

District of Bhutan

Coordinates: 27°0′N 89°55′E

Dagana District དར་དཀར་ནང་རྫོང་ཁག།
- District
- Seal

- Location of Dagana district within Bhutan
- Country: Bhutan
- Headquarters: Dagana

Area
  - Total: 1,713 km^{2} (661 sq mi)

Population (2017)
  - Total: 24,965
  - Density: 14.57/km^{2} (37.75/sq mi)
- Time zone: UTC+6 (BTT)
- HDI (2019): 0.607 medium · 13th of 20
- Website: www.dagana.gov.bt

Dagana District (Dzongkha: དར་དཀར་ནང་རྫོང་ཁག།; Wylie: dar-dkar-nang rzong-khag; also དར་དཀར་ན་རྫོང་ཁག།) is one of the 20 districts of Bhutan. Covering an area of 1,713 km^{2} (661 sq mi), it is located in the lower foothills of the mid-Himalayan ranges. The district had a population of 24,965 people as of 2017, living across 14 gewogs (village blocks). Economically, Dagana's population follows mixed subsistence agriculture and livestock rearing.

== History ==
The history of Dagana district is centered around the castle of Daga Dzong. The dzong, a prominent feature of the district, was originally established in 1651 by Zhabdrung Ngawang Namgyal, the unifier of Bhutan. The dzong serves as the administrative and religious center of the district. There are three megaliths– Do Namkhai Kaw (sky pillar rock), Do Kelpai Genthey (rock of ancient steps), and Tha Namkhai Dzong (frontier sky fortress), associated with the legend of the building of the dzong. The district has several Buddhist monasteries, major of which are the Shathong Lhakhang and Nyindukha Lhakhang.

== Geography ==
Dagana District is located in the southern part of Bhutan. It borders Sarpang District to the east, Tsirang District to the north, Chukha District to the west, and the Indian states of Assam and West Bengal to the south. The district covers an area of approximately 1,713 km^{2} (661 sq mi). Dagana is located about 252 km (157 mi) away from the Bhutanese capital of Thimphu. About 80% of the district is covered by forests, and hardwood trees dominate the region. Portions of the Dagana district forms part of the Phibsoo Wildlife Sanctuary in southern Bhutan.

=== Climate ===
The district has a warm temperate climate, with most of the rainfall in summer. It is classified as Cwb in the Köppen-Geiger climate classification.

Climate data for Dagana, elevation 1,460 m (4,790 ft), (2006–2017 normals, extremes 1996–2017)
Month	Jan	Feb	Mar	Apr	May	Jun	Jul	Aug	Sep	Oct	Nov	Dec	Year
Record high °C (°F)	20.0 (68.0)	22.0 (71.6)	26.0 (78.8)	26.0 (78.8)	30.0 (86.0)	29.0 (84.2)	30.0 (86.0)	29.5 (85.1)	30.0 (86.0)	29.5 (85.1)	27.0 (80.6)	25.0 (77.0)	30.0 (86.0)
Mean daily maximum °C (°F)	12.6 (54.7)	14.4 (57.9)	17.5 (63.5)	19.5 (67.1)	21.8 (71.2)	22.4 (72.3)	22.5 (72.5)	22.8 (73.0)	21.8 (71.2)	20.6 (69.1)	17.7 (63.9)	14.7 (58.5)	19.0 (66.2)
Daily mean °C (°F)	8.8 (47.8)	10.4 (50.7)	13.3 (55.9)	16.2 (61.2)	18.5 (65.3)	19.6 (67.3)	20.0 (68.0)	20.0 (68.0)	18.9 (66.0)	16.7 (62.1)	13.1 (55.6)	10.4 (50.7)	15.5 (59.9)
Mean daily minimum °C (°F)	4.9 (40.8)	6.4 (43.5)	9.1 (48.4)	12.8 (55.0)	15.1 (59.2)	16.8 (62.2)	17.5 (63.5)	17.2 (63.0)	15.9 (60.6)	12.7 (54.9)	8.5 (47.3)	6.1 (43.0)	11.9 (53.5)
Record low °C (°F)	−1.5 (29.3)	0.0 (32.0)	0.7 (33.3)	5.5 (41.9)	8.0 (46.4)	10.5 (50.9)	12.5 (54.5)	12.0 (53.6)	11.0 (51.8)	5.5 (41.9)	1.0 (33.8)	−1.5 (29.3)	−1.5 (29.3)
Average precipitation mm (inches)	10.5 (0.41)	31.8 (1.25)	40.9 (1.61)	99.6 (3.92)	190.3 (7.49)	326.1 (12.84)	345.0 (13.58)	323.0 (12.72)	272.3 (10.72)	122.4 (4.82)	7.4 (0.29)	5.0 (0.20)	1,774.3 (69.85)
Average relative humidity (%)	72.9	72.6	71.9	73.7	78.5	85.0	88.0	86.2	85.6	78.1	72.7	72.9	78.2
Source: National Center for Hydrology and Meteorology (precipitation and humidity 1996–2017)

Climate data for Sunkosh, Dagana District, elevation 410 m (1,350 ft), (1996–2017 normals)
Month	Jan	Feb	Mar	Apr	May	Jun	Jul	Aug	Sep	Oct	Nov	Dec	Year
Record high °C (°F)	28.5 (83.3)	32.0 (89.6)	36.0 (96.8)	36.0 (96.8)	37.5 (99.5)	37.0 (98.6)	37.0 (98.6)	36.5 (97.7)	35.5 (95.9)	34.5 (94.1)	32.0 (89.6)	30.5 (86.9)	37.5 (99.5)
Mean daily maximum °C (°F)	22.6 (72.7)	25.1 (77.2)	28.0 (82.4)	29.8 (85.6)	31.0 (87.8)	30.9 (87.6)	30.6 (87.1)	31.1 (88.0)	30.5 (86.9)	29.5 (85.1)	27.0 (80.6)	23.7 (74.7)	28.3 (83.0)
Daily mean °C (°F)	15.7 (60.3)	18.0 (64.4)	20.9 (69.6)	24.1 (75.4)	26.1 (79.0)	27.0 (80.6)	26.9 (80.4)	27.0 (80.6)	26.2 (79.2)	23.9 (75.0)	20.2 (68.4)	16.9 (62.4)	22.7 (72.9)
Mean daily minimum °C (°F)	8.7 (47.7)	10.9 (51.6)	13.7 (56.7)	18.3 (64.9)	21.1 (70.0)	23.0 (73.4)	23.1 (73.6)	22.9 (73.2)	21.9 (71.4)	18.2 (64.8)	13.4 (56.1)	10.1 (50.2)	17.1 (62.8)
Record low °C (°F)	4.0 (39.2)	6.0 (42.8)	7.0 (44.6)	11.0 (51.8)	16.0 (60.8)	18.5 (65.3)	20.0 (68.0)	19.5 (67.1)	17.0 (62.6)	12.0 (53.6)	8.5 (47.3)	6.0 (42.8)	4.0 (39.2)
Average rainfall mm (inches)	8.5 (0.33)	11.1 (0.44)	28.0 (1.10)	57.1 (2.25)	100.1 (3.94)	241.5 (9.51)	404.3 (15.92)	290.8 (11.45)	164.5 (6.48)	86.0 (3.39)	2.1 (0.08)	3.2 (0.13)	1,397.2 (55.02)
Source: National Center for Hydrology and Meteorology

== Administrative divisions ==
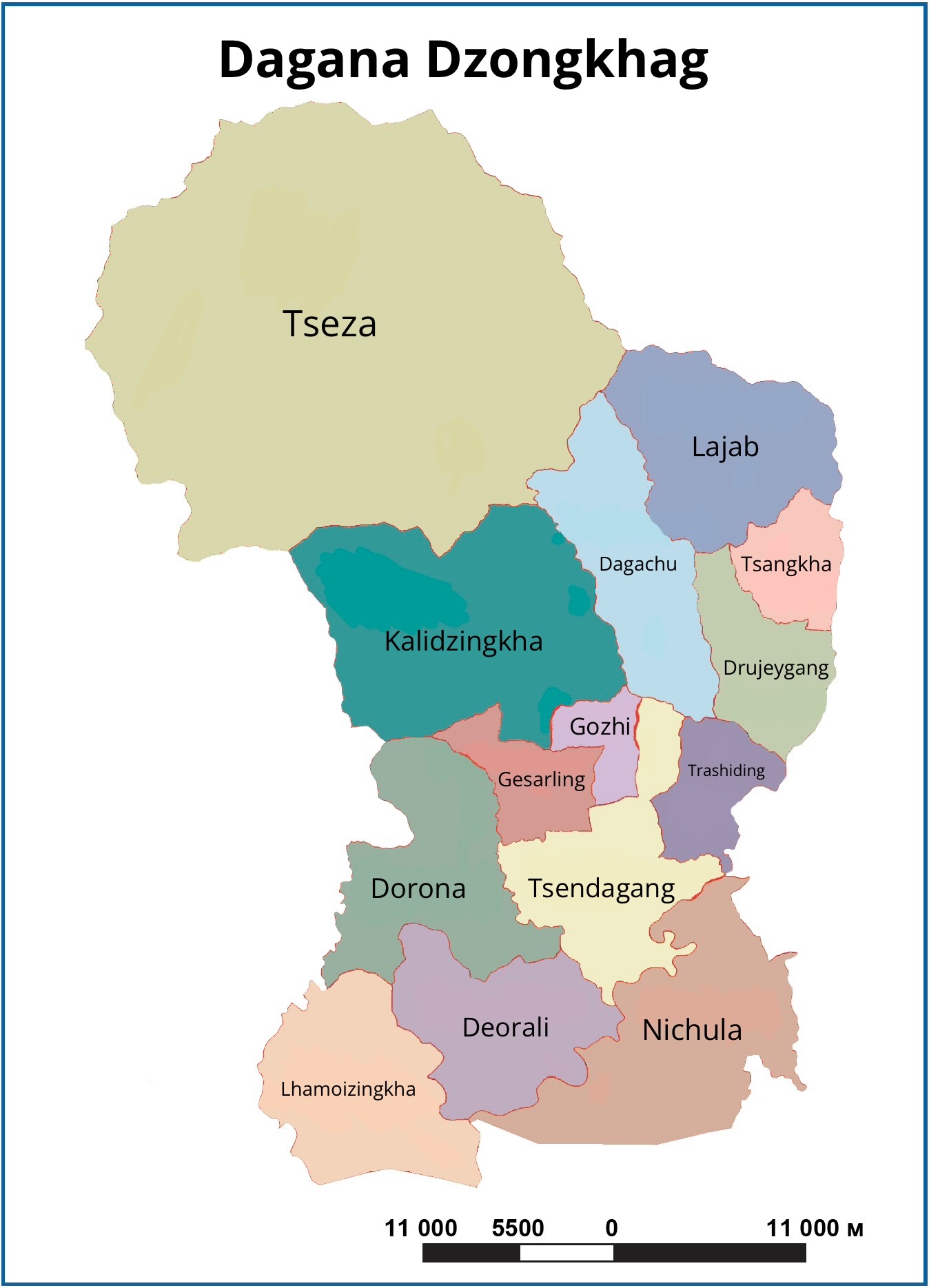
Map of the Gewogs of Dagana Dzongkhag

Dagana District itself is divided into fourteen village blocks (or gewogs):

- Dorona Gewog
- Drujegang Gewog
- Gesarling Gewog
- Goshi Gewog
- Karmaling Gewog
- Karna Gewog
- Khebisa Gewog
- Lajab Gewog
- Lhamoy Zingkha Gewog
- Nichula Gewog
- Tashiding Gewog
- Tsangkha Gewog
- Tsendagang Gewog
- Tseza Gewog

In April 2007, Lhamoy Zingkha Dungkhag (sub-district) was formally handed over from Sarpang Dzongkhag to Dagana Dzongkhag.

== Demographics ==
The district had a population of 24,965 people as of 2017, with 51.9% male, 48.1% female. The population is spread across various communities and settlements, with 81% of the population residing in rural areas. The district is home to diverse ethnic groups, and the population is mainly composed of Lhotshampas and Ngalops. Ngalops are the early settlers of the district predating later Lhotshampa settlers. The economy is based on smallholder mixed farming and livestock management. The district has several cultural and religious sites, and is the centre of the annual Tshechu festival.

== See also ==
- Daga Province
