= National parks of Bhutan =

List of National Parks in Bhutan

In Bhutan there are (as of June 2017) five national parks and 16 other nature reserves. The protection of nature is under the supervision of the Department of Forests and Park Services of the Department of Agriculture. The protection of the environment and nature is considered to be one of the cornerstones of gross national happiness. Nature reserves take up 48 percent of the kingdom's land area.

== National Parks ==
=== Jigme Dorji National Park ===
With over 4,316 km^{2}, the Jigme-Dorji National Park is the second largest protected area in Bhutan. It is one of the most biodiverse areas of the eastern Himalayas and stretches from the deciduous forest to the eternal ice fields and glaciers on the north-western border of Bhutan.

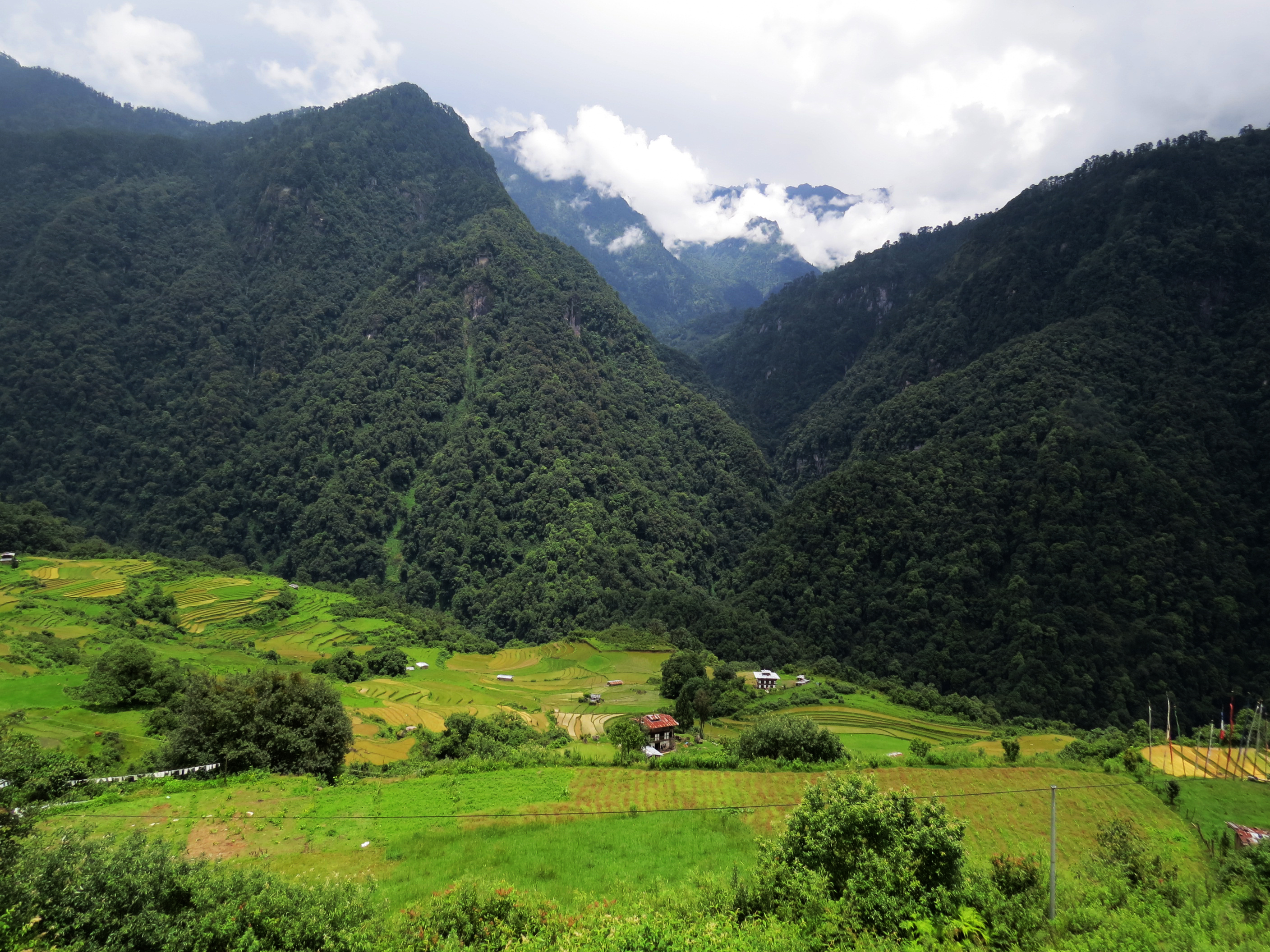
Densely forested mountains of Jigme Dorji National Park

=== Jigme Singye Wangchuk National Park ===
With an area of 1,730 km^{2}, the Jigme Singye Wangchuck National Park in the center of the country is the third largest in Bhutan. The different habitats range from ice-covered mountain peaks to coniferous and deciduous forests.

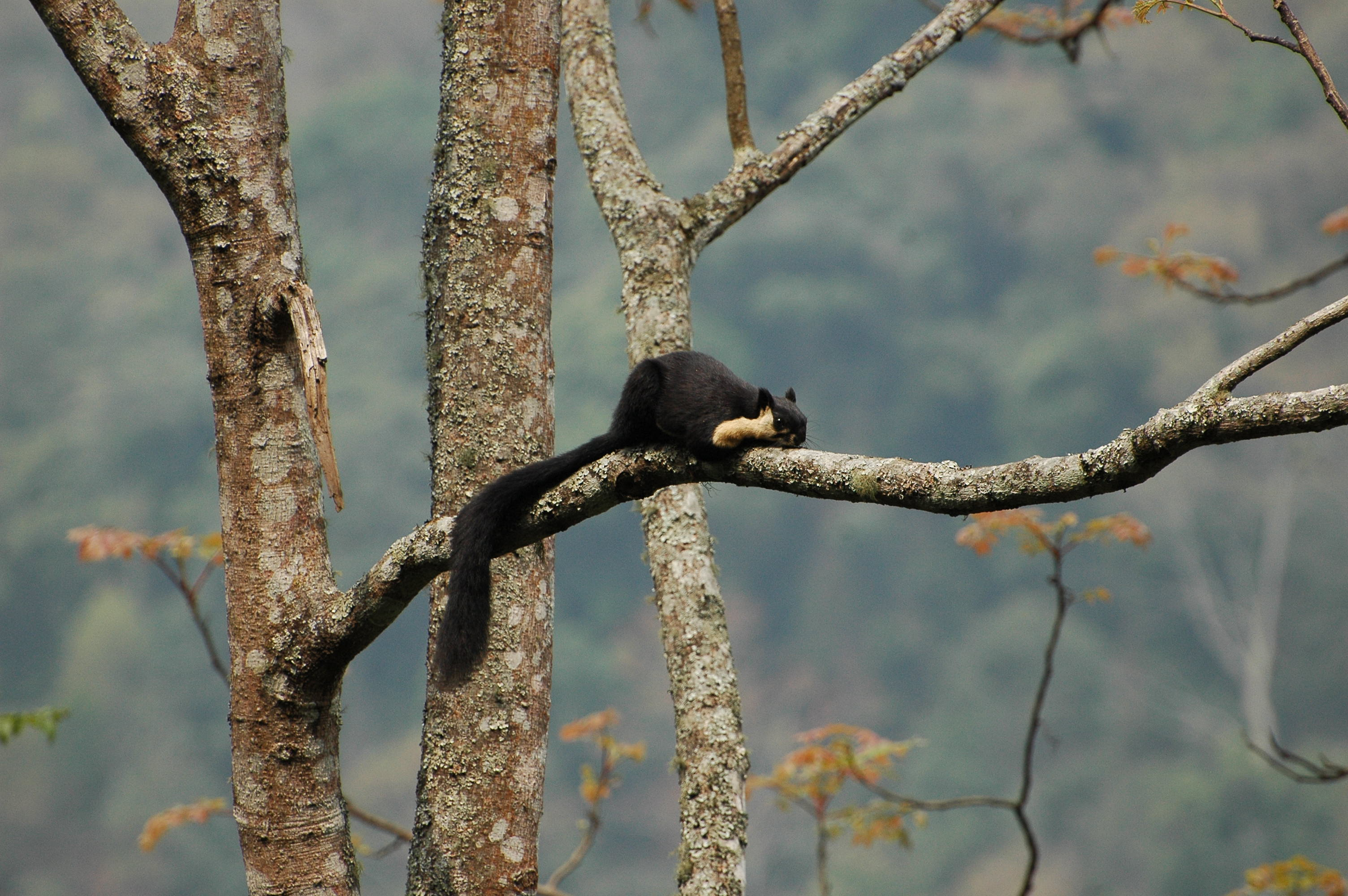
Malayan giant squirrel (Ratufa bicolor) on the way to Korphu

=== Royal Manas National Park ===
The Royal Manas National Park is considered the crown jewel of Bhutan and is a former royal hunting area. With 1,057 km^{2} this forms the largest tropical and subtropical ecosystem in the country. With thousands of animal and plant species, many of which are considered threatened worldwide. It is not only the protected area with the highest biodiversity in Bhutan, but also one of the most extraordinary places in the world. Located in south-central Bhutan, its southern border extends to the UNESCO World Heritage Site of India, the Manas National Park. In the north it borders on the Jigme Singye Wangchuck National Park. In 1966, Royal Manas was designated as a Wildlife Sanctuary, making it the oldest nature reserve in Bhutan. In 1993 the area was declared a national park. From May to September the monsoons bring up to 5000 mm of rain. In winter it only rains in small amounts. The climate is very pleasant from November to February. The area is exceptionally rich in species, including Bengal tiger, Asian elephant, water buffalo, Indian rhinoceros, clouded leopard, sloth bear, himalayan black bear, golden langur, ganges dolphin and pangolin. More than 426 species of birds have officially been sighted here. It is assumed, however, that another 200 species of birds can be found in the park. The globally threatened species such as the hornbill, the black sea eagle, the second largest species of heron, the imperial heron, the spotted dwarf animal, mountain rattle and the magnificent cuckoo also live here. Many of the over 900 plant species found in the park are of commercial, medicinal, traditional, or religious significance.

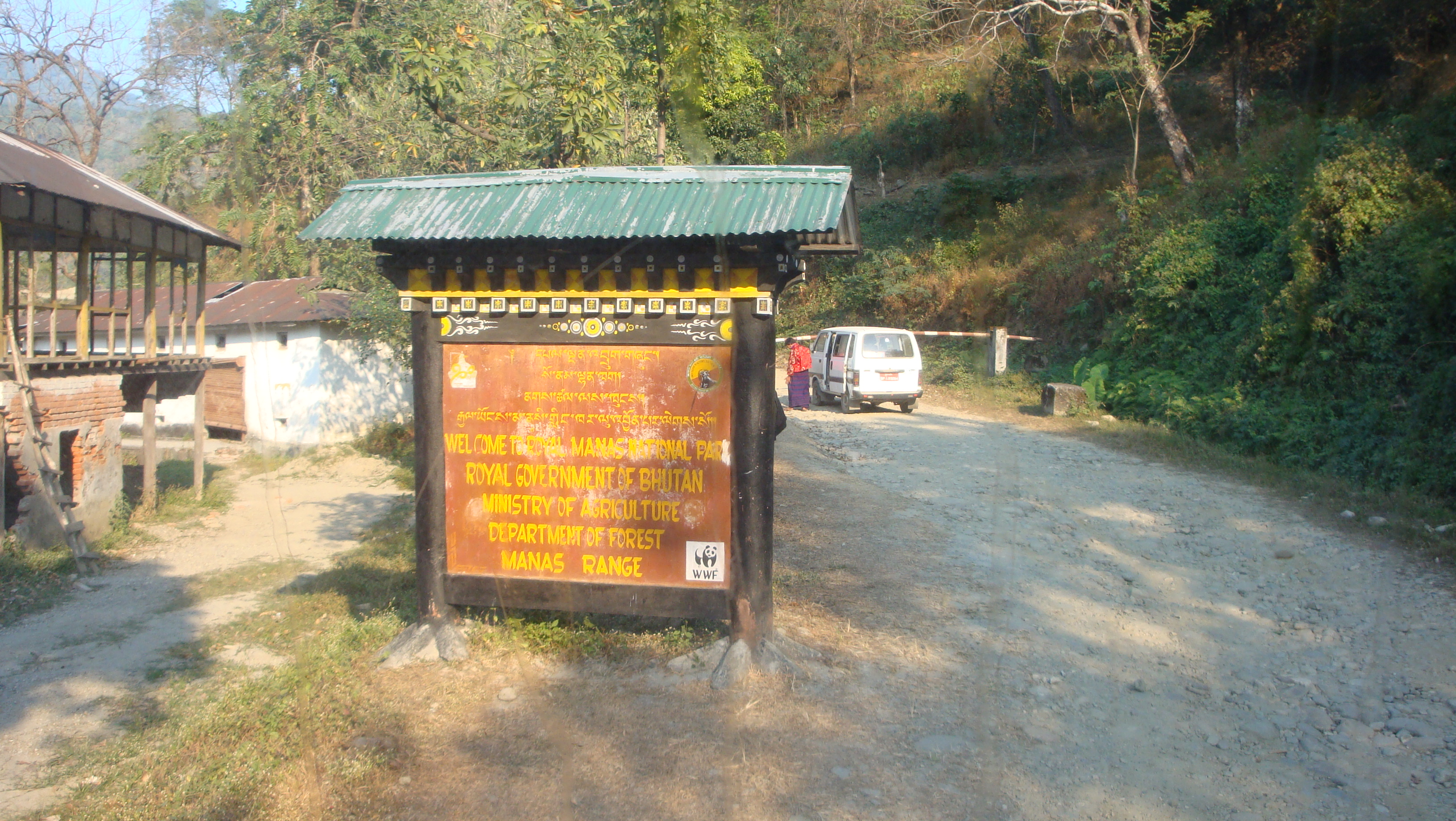
Royal Manas National Park Entrance

=== Phrumshingla National Park ===
The 905 km^{2} large Phrumshingla National Park, which is located in the center of Bhutan and opened in July 1998, is one of the youngest national parks in Bhutan.

Untouched forests range from alpine heights down to subtropical deciduous forests. Together with the snow leopard, king tiger and red panda, rare plants form a globally unique and important habitat. The altitudes range from 1000 to over 4000 m, with temperatures between −21 °C to 28 °C, the park has one of the greatest climatic differences in the world. The park caused a sensation in 2000 when the WWF used a photo trap to photograph a tiger at an altitude of 3,000 meters. This was the first time that a photo of this species was taken at this altitude. In addition, 341 different bird species make the area a paradise for every bird watcher. The park is also known for its breathtaking mountain scenery, which attracts numerous tourists and hikers every year. These help to maintain the national park and the communities in the park.

=== Wangchuck Centennial Park ===
The Wangchuck Centennial Park is the largest national park in the country with 4,921 km^{2}. It was established in 2008 as the youngest national park.

== Other protected areas ==
- Torsa Strict Nature Reserve, 609 km^{2}
- Bumdeling wildlife sanctuary, 1,521 km^{2}, is on the tentative list as a world heritage site in Bhutan
- Motithang Takin Preserve (Thimphu District)
- Khaling Wildlife Sanctuary, 334 km^{2}
- Phipsoo Wildlife Sanctuary, 609 km^{2}
- Sakteng wildlife sanctuary, 741 km^{2}, is on the tentative list as a world heritage site in Bhutan
- Biological corridor 1, 149 km^{2}
- Biological corridor 2, 275 km^{2}
- Biological corridor 3, 376 km^{2}
- Biological corridor 4, 501 km^{2}
- Biological corridor 5, 212 km^{2}
- Biological corridor 6, 160 km^{2}
- Biological corridor 7, 420 km^{2}
- Biological corridor 8, 720 km^{2}
- Gangtey-Phobji, 9.7 km^{2}, Ramsar area
- Bumdeling, 1.42 km^{2}, Ramsar area
- Khotoka, 1.14 km^{2}, Ramsar area
