= Department of Forests and Park Services of Bhutan =

Department overview
- Formed: 1952
- Preceding Department: Department of forestry services
- Type: Government Department
- Jurisdiction: Royal Government of Bhutan
- Headquarters: Tashichodzong, Thimphu, Bhutan
- Minister responsible: Mr.Gem Tshering
- Department executive: Mr. Karma Tenzin., Director
- Parent Department: Ministry of Energy and Natural Resources
- Child agencies: Nature Conservation Division; Forest Resources Planning and Management Division; Forest Monitoring and Information Division; Ugyen Wangchuk Institute for Forestry Research and Training
- Website: www.dofps.gov.bt

== Background ==
The Department of Forests and Park Services of Bhutan which was founded in 1952 is responsible to protect, conserve, utilize and manage the forestry resources of Bhutan. It was one of the oldest government departments in Bhutan. During the inception of the Department back in the 1950s, the department has been staffed by the foresters from India. This was due to the lack of trained personnel from Bhutan at that time. As of now, the Department is fully staffed by the nationals.

== History ==
The Department of Forests and Park Services was established in 1952 under the name "Department of Forests" which was before the starting of the FYPs in the country. In 1961 the Department was under the Ministry of Trade, Industry and Forests.

In the early 1980s, the Department was put under the Ministry of Agriculture during a reorganisation exercise by RCSC based on cadre system.

== Forestry policy and Legislation ==
Bhutanese have always been endowed with rich renewable resources. Majority of the people in Bhutan reside in the rural areas of the country. These section of the country rely heavily on the forest resources for their livelihood. Until the 1960s the people in Bhutan made use of the forest resources in their vicinity without much interferences from the Government.

== Vision and mission ==
=== Vision ===
"A Sustainable Forest Ecosystems for the People, Nature and Economy"

=== Mission ===
"To conserve and manage Bhutan’s natural resources through the adoption of innovative technologies to ensure socio-economic and environmental wellbeing, while maintaining a minimum 60% of the land under forest cover for all times to come."

== Functional Divisions ==
The Department of Forests and Park Services is composed of four functional divisions.

=== Forest Protection and Enforcement Division (FPED) ===
The Forest Protection and Enforcement Division, the then Forest Protection & Land Use Section (FPLUS) was formed sometime in 1991 as one of the oldest Functional Divisions under the Department. It was renamed to FPUD in 2000.

The objective of this division is to ensure forest protection, sustainable management & utilization of land & forest resources.

==== Sections/Programmes ====
Sections or programmes under this functional division are as follows:

==== Forest Protection ====
Functions the under Forest Protection section are;

1. Forest Litigation-functions
2. Forest Epidemics-functions and
3. Anti-Poaching

==== Forest Utilization ====
This is the main section under the functional division which ensures to maintain uniform allocation of Natural Resources sustainably throughout the country.

==== Forest Landuse ====
This section oversees the appropriate use and allocation of the state reserved forest lands properly in line with the existing Acts, Rules and regulations.

==== Forest Fire Management ====
This section oversees the various activities pertaining to the prevention and minimizing of forest fire in the country.

=== Forest Monitoring and Information Division (FMID) ===
The forests resource management division under the DoFPS ensures the sustainable management of forestry resources of Bhutan. Scientific management of Forest is done through the establishment of Forest Management Units. The division was renamed to FRMD in 2000 from Forest Resource Development Division.

==== Sections ====
1. Forest Management Planning Section
2. Inventory and Data Section
3. Monitoring and Implementation Support Section
4. Geographical Information System Section
5. Forest Demarcation Section

=== Nature Conservation Division (NCD) ===
The Nature Conservation Division under the Department was established in 1992 to plan and implement conservation programs in the country. This division is the sole technical support provider to the protected areas.

==== Technical Sections under the NCD ====
1. Species Conservation and Monitoring Section (SCMS)
2. Nature Recreation and Ecotourism Section (NRES)
3. Protected Area Section (PAS)
4. Human Wildlife Conflict Management Section (HWCMS)

=== Social Forestry and Extension Division (SFED) ===
The Social Forestry and Extension Division under the Department was established in 1989 under the name "Afforestation Division".

==== Sections under SFED ====
1. Social Forestry Section
2. Plantation Section
3. NWFP Section

=== Watershed Management Division (WMD) ===
This Division was created on 25 May 2009 after the proposal for its creation in January 2009. The primary mandate of this division is to implement the watershed management program.

==== Sections under the Division ====
1. Rangeland farming section
2. Forest Section
3. Water and Climate section

=== Nature Recreation and Eco-tourism Division (NRED) ===
==== Sections under the NRED ====
1. Survey and Eco-design section
2. Planning and product development section
3. Education and communication section

== Territorial Divisions ==
The forests which are outside the jurisdiction of the protected areas are being managed through the 14 territorial forest divisions located at various places in the country. Prior to 2016, there were only 12 territorial forest divisions.

=== Bumthang Forest Division ===
==== Background ====
Bumthang Forest Division was established in April 1983 at Lamigoenpa in Lamai Goenpa Dzong which currently houses the Ugyen Wangchuck Institute for Conservation and Environment

Prior to the establishment of this territorial forest division, in the 1970s forestry activities in the Bumthang Dzongkhag were carried out by a forestry beat office which was housed in a private house at Joak near Jakar Lhakhang with the headquarter at Sarbang Forest Division. The beat office was under the Trongsa Range then.

Before the creation of Mongar forest division in 1985, this territorial forest division has been looking after Zhemgang, Mongar, Lhuntse, Trongsa and Bumthang Dzongkhags. With the creation of Zhemgang Division on July 28, 2003, this division handed over the Trongsa and Zhemgang Dzongkhags to the Zhemgang Forest Division.

==== Significance ====
Besides being one of the busiest territorial forest divisions in the country, the territorial forest division is also a home to some of the very important species of wild flora and fauna.

For instance, the national animal Bhutan Takin, Raven, Blue Poppy and the Cypress are found in the areas which fall under the jurisdiction of Bumthang Forest Division.

==== Vegetation ====
- Cool Temperate Forest with mostly Blue Pine forests and other conifers
- Sub-alpine
- Alpine Scrub

==== Area Coverage ====
This territorial forest division spans over an area of less than 67,0652 acres.

==== Bordering areas ====
- North: International Boundary with China
- East: Phromrong ridge (Phrumsengla National Park)
- West: Yotongla ridge(Zhemgang Division’s boundary)
- South: Zuri Kertsho (Zhemgang Division’s boundary)

==== Altitude Range ====
2600m to more than 4000m above sea level

==== Administration ====
===== Divisional Headquarters =====
The Divisional Headquarters is located at Badthpalathang, about 500 meters away from Chamkhar town.

===== Forest Range Offices =====
1. Bumthang Range
2. Chumey Range
3. Trongsa Range

===== Forest Beat Offices =====
1. Tang Beat Office
2. Tangsibji Beat Office
3. Nubi Beat Office

===== Forest Management Units =====
1. Dawathang FMU
2. Karshong FMU
3. Chendebji FMU
4. Rodungla FMU

===== Forest Check Posts =====
1. Chamkhar Checkpost

==== Forest Coverage ====
66.7%

==== Sections ====
1. Technical Section
  1. Resource Management Section
  2. Conservation and Protection Section
  3. Resource Allotment and Trade Section
  4. Research and Information Management Section

===== Administrative and Finance Sections =====
1. Administrative Section
2. Finance Section

=== Gedu Forest Division ===
==== Background ====
In the year 1985, Sub-Divisional Forest Office was opened at Gedu in the old site office of Bhutan Logging Corporation (BLC) and later new Divisional office was constructed and Gedu Territorial Divisional Forest Office was established in the year 1988.

==== Area Coverage ====
Gedu Territorial Forest Division covers entire Chukha Dzongkhag (11 Gewogs) and have total area of 1,991 km2 (769 sq mi). Gedu Territorial Forest Division is gateway for import and export of Forestry products and is also the commercial and financial hub of Bhutan.

==== Range and beat Offices ====
There are three Range offices (Gedu, Tshimasham and Phuntsholing) and Five beat Offices (Chapcha, Wangkha, Darla, Kungkha and Pasakha Beat Office) under Gedu Territorial Forest Division.

Range offices, their jurisdiction and Beat offices under Gedu Forest Division
| Sl. No | Name of Range | Location of Range Office | Gewogs covered | Beat offices under the Range |
|---|---|---|---|---|
| 1 | Gedu Range | Gedu near Gedu Divisional Forest Office | Bongo, Darla, Getana, Gelling, Metakha, Dungna and upper parts of Phuntsholing Gewogs | Darla and Kungkha Beat |
| 2 | Tshimasham Range | Tshimasham | Chapcha and Bjabcho Gewogs | Chapcha and Wangkha Beat office |
| 3 | Phuntsholing Range | Phuntsholing Main Town | Samphelling Gewog, Phuntsholing Gewog, Phuntsholing Thromde and Lokchina Gewog | Pasakha Beat Office |

==== Sections ====
===== Technical Section =====
1. Coordinate and correspond on behalf of Division.
2. Monitoring of Plantation activities of Division and reporting to SFED.
3. General Patrolling to curb illegal activities.
4. Maintain records of timber supplied to other Dzongkhag and special allotment made for Dzongs, Lhakhangs, etc.
5. Update and maintain proper record of timber supplied Dzongkhag wise, Gewog wise and for other purposes.
6. Prepare and maintain report on the type and number of timber supplied for commercial purpose.
7. Coordinate, prepare and Renew management Plan for FMU.
8. Issue clearance for Land/Transmission & Road construction, etc.
9. Maintaining record of forestry clearance issued for Land allotment ( Kidu, substitute), lease, transmission & telephone lines, Road, etc.
10. Preparation and submission of quarterly/annual report of Land/Transmission and Roads.
11. Maintain records of Stone and sand quarry.
12. Correspondence and maintain records of Wild life and NWFP.
13. Preparation and Maintaining of Quarterly/Annual report for timber extracted by NRDCL form outside FMU like from transmissions lines, working Schemes, etc.
14. Provide back up of important information to the Division as and when required.
15. Verification of field reports submitted by Range offices.

===== Administration =====
1. Planning and preparation of five year plans and annual plan for the Division.
2. Maintain and update service records and process promotion and training of staffs.
3. Maintain record of all fix assets, stores (equipments, furniture) and stationeries including permits books of the Division and Ranges.
4. Coordinate and correspond on behalf of the Division in both Dzongkha and English
5. Conduct advertisement/tender/quotation/procurement of store items, etc.
6. Process, verify and maintain proper record of rural house building timber, firewood, fencing poles, flag poles, etc.

===== Accounts Section =====
1. Overall financial management of the Division
2. Timely preparation and submission of monthly accounts to the Department of Public Accounts
3. Coordinate and monitor the collection and deposit of revenues by Ranges.
4. Preparation and submission of annual budget timely.
5. To coordinate tendering and procurement process
6. Prepare and submit financial report to the data manager.
7. Provide back up of important information to the Division as and when required.

===== Data Management Section =====
1. Timely preparation and submission of monthly, quarterly, annual and any other reports to the Forest Directorate.
2. Provide timely and accurate data to Forest Directorate with prior consent of section heads
3. As a data manager up date and maintain Division’s data base.
4. Realization of GRF lease rent annually.

=== Divisional Forest Office, Paro ===
The Divisional Forest Office (DFO) is the forest division which caters to the various forestry services to the people of Paro and Haa Dzongkhags.

==== Sections ====
1. Timber & Technical Section
2. Planning Section
3. Monitoring Protection Section
4. Social Forestry & Wildlife Section

==== Administration ====
===== Forest Range Offices =====
  1. Haa Forest Range Office
  2. Paro Forest Range Office

=== Samtse Forest Division ===
==== Administration ====
Range Offices Under the Samtse Division and their jurisdiction
| Sl.No | Name of Range office | Gewogs Covered | Dzongkhags covered |
|---|---|---|---|
| 1 | Samtse Range | Tading, Samtse, Phuntshopelri | Samtse |
| 2 | Tashicholing | Tashicholing, Pemaling, Namgaycholing, Tendruk | Samtse |
| 3 | Norbugang Range | Sangacholing, Norbugang, Ugyentse, Yoseltse | Samtse |
| 4 | Dophuchen Range | Denchukha, Dophuchen, Dumtoed | Samtse |

=== Samdrup Jongkhar Forest Division ===
==== Administration ====
Range Offices Under the Samdrup Jomgkhar Division and their jurisdiction
| Sl.No | Name of Range office | Gewogs Covered | Dzongkhags covered |
|---|---|---|---|
| 1 | Samdrup Jongkhar Range | Deothang, Gomdhar, Wangphu, Orong | Samdrup Jongkhar |
| 2 | Jomotsangkha Range | Lauri, Serthi, Langchenphu | Samdrup Jongkhar |
| 3 | Samdrupcholing Range | Martshalla, Samrang, Phuntshothang, Pemathang | Samdrup Jomgkhar |
| 4 | Nganglam Range | Chokorling, Decheling, Norbugang | Samdrup Jongkhar |

=== Tashigang Forest Division ===
==== Administration ====
Range Offices Under the Tashigang Division and their jurisdiction
| Sl.No | Name of Range office | Gewogs Covered | Dzongkhags covered |
|---|---|---|---|
| 1 | Radhi Range | Radhi, Phongmey, Bidung, Shongphu | Trashigang |
| 2 | Tashigang Range | Samkhar, Yangneer, Kanglung, Udzorong, Bartsham | Trashigang |
| 3 | Wamrong Range | Lumang, Thrimshing, Khaling, Kangpara | Trashigang |
| 4 | Tashiyangtse Range | Yangtse, Khamdang, Toetse | Tashiyangtse |
| 5 | Doksum Range | Ramjar, Jamkhar, Tongzhang, Yalang | Tashiyangtse |

=== Sarpang Forest Division ===
==== Administration ====
Range Offices Under the Sarpang Division
| Sl.No | Name of Range office | Gewogs Covered | Dzongkhags covered |
|---|---|---|---|
| 1 | Sarpang Range | Sarpangtar, Singye, Dekiling, Shompangkha, Hilley, Doban | Sarpnag |
| 2 | Gelephu Range | Gelephu, Jigmecholing, Sershong, Bhur, Chuzagang, Umling | Sarpang |
| 3 | Lhamoizingkha Range | Lhamoizingkha, Nichula, Deorali | Sarpang |

=== Zhemgang Forest Division ===
==== Administration ====
Range Offices Under the Zhemgang Division
| Sl.No | Name of Range office | Gewogs Covered | Dzongkhags covered |
|---|---|---|---|
| 1 | Zhemgang Range | Trong, Nangkor | Zhemgang |
| 2 | Panbang Range | Goshing, Bjoka, Nangla | Zhemgang |
| 3 | Khomshar Range | Bardho, Shingkhar | Zhemgang |

=== Mongar Forest Division ===
Mongar Forest Division is one of the 14 Territorial Forest Divisions situated in the eastern part of Bhutan. The Division was formally established in 1985.

In the initial phase Trashigang was also under Mongar Division. After establishment of separate Division for Trashigang and Trashiyangtse region, Mongar Division is entrusted with forest management responsibility of 17 geogs in Mongar Dzongkhag and 7 geogs in Lhuntse Dzongkhag and spans over an area of 2,323,54 sq.km.

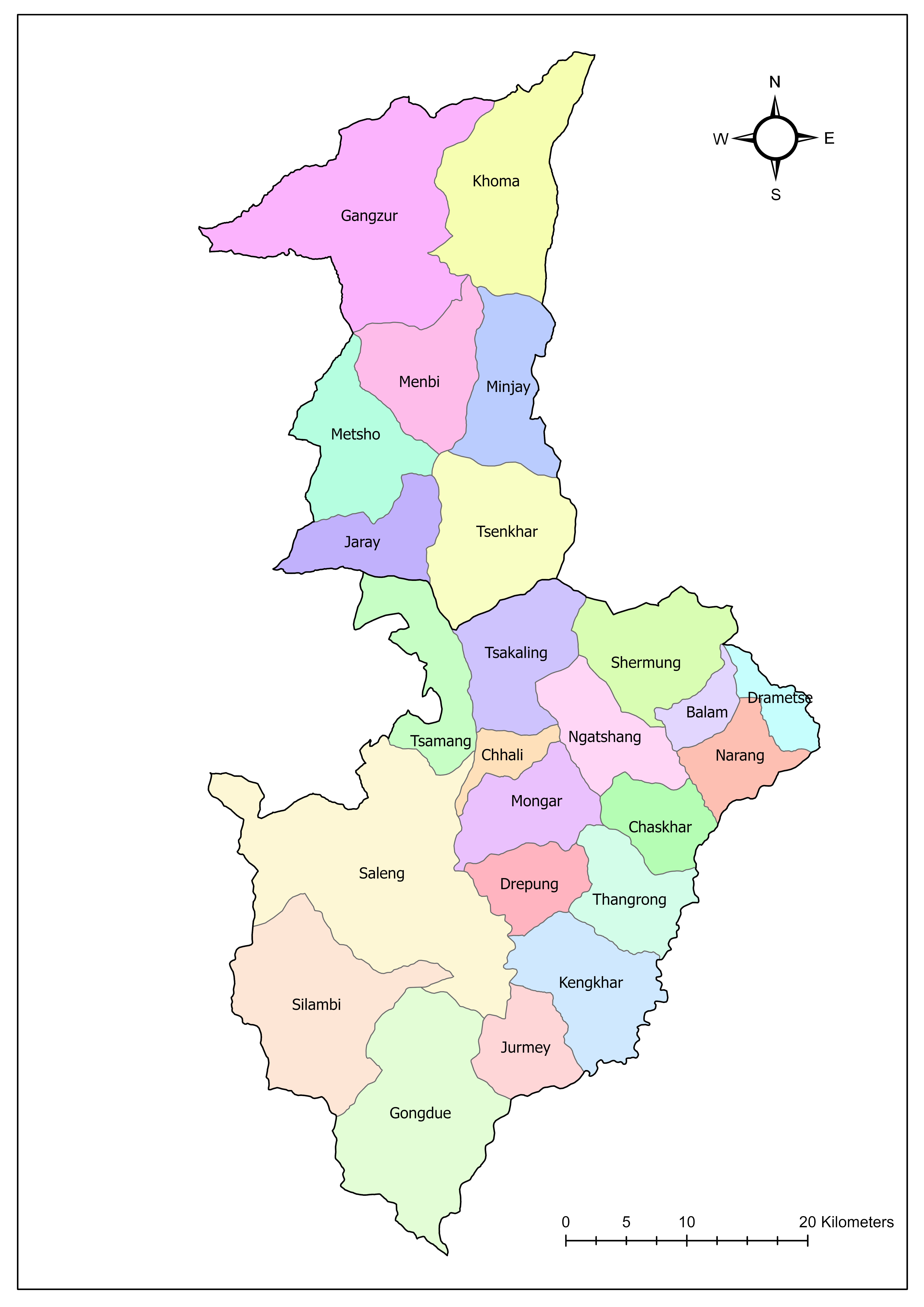
Gewogs of Lhuentse & Mongar under Mongar Divisional Office

==== Administration ====
1. Forest Range Offices
  1. Mongar Forest Range Office
  2. Lhuntse Forest Range Office
  3. Gyelposhing Forest Range Office
2. Forest Management Units
  1. Rongmenchu FMU
  2. Korrila FMU
  3. Lingmethang FMU

==== Geographic area ====
Mongar Forest division covers an area of 2,323,54 sq.km.

==== Geographic Location ====
Latitude= 26°50’ and 28° 10’ N Longitude= 90° 46’ and 91°10’E

==== Altitude range ====
400 to 4000 meters above sea level.

==== Bordering areas ====
- East= Trashigang Division
- West= Phrumsengla National Park
- North= Wangchuck Centennial National Park & Bumdeling Wildlife Sanctuary.
- South=Samdrup Jongkhar Division

==== Vegetation type ====
- Sub-tropical broadleaved forest
- Chirpine forest
- Temperate broadleaved forest
- Bluepine forest

=== Wangdue Forest Division ===
The Wangdue Forest Division was established in 1990 at Lobesa. It is one of the largest divisions in Bhutan at 5030.00 sq km. The Wangdue territorial forest Division is divided into various forest management units.

==== Administration ====
Range Offices Under the Wangdue Division
| Sl.No | Name of Range office | Gewogs Covered | Dzongkhags covered |
|---|---|---|---|
| 1 | Punakha Range | Tewong, Limbu, Talo, Chubu, Kabjai, Shengnana, Dzomi, Guma | Punakha |
| 2 | Lobesa Range | Barp and Toeb | Punakha |
| 3 | Wangdue Range | Phangyul, Kazhi, Bjena, Thedtsho, Nahi, Daga, Gase Tshowom, Gase Tshogom, Athang | Wangdue Phodrang |
| 4 | Nobding Range | Phobji, Gangtey, Dangchu and Sephu | Wangdue Phodrang |

=== Thimphu Forest ===
==== Administration ====
Range Offices Under the Thimphu Division and their jurisdiction
| Sl.No | Name of Range office | Gewogs Covered | Dzongkhags covered |
|---|---|---|---|
| 1 | Thimphu Range | Kawang, Chang | Thimphu |
| 2 | Khasadrapchu Range | Gene, Mewang, Dagala | Thimphu |

=== Tsirang Forest Division ===
==== Administration ====
Range Offices Under the Tsirang Division
| Sl.No | Name of Range office | Gewogs Covered | Dzongkhags covered |
|---|---|---|---|
| 1 | Tsirang Range | Kilkhorthang, Dunglagang, Gosarling, Tsholingkhar, Tsirangtoe, Phuentenchu, Sergithang, Semjong, Rangthangling, Mendrelgang, Patshaling, Barshong | Tsirang |

=== Dagana Forest Division ===
With its head office at Dagapela, the Dagana Forest Division was established formally on 8 November 2016.

This Forest Division with its two administrative range offices and two beat offices will cater to the services of the people.

=== Pema Gatshel Forest Division ===
Pema Gatshel Forest Division was established with its office inaugurated on 17 November 2016.

==== Administration ====
Two Range Offices, Pemagatshel and Nganglam along with three Beat Offices, one each at Dungmaed, Yurung and Nanong, and two Checkposts at Kherogompa and Nganglam will cater to the services of the people.

== Protected Areas and Biological Corridors ==
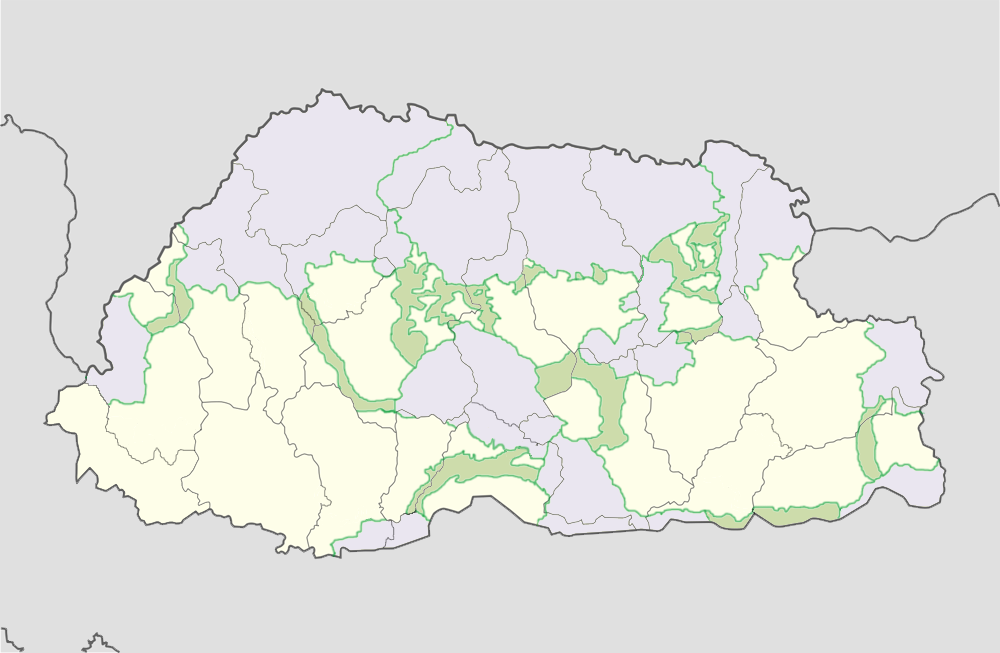

Protected areas of Bhutan in lavender, biological corridors in green.

=== Protected areas ===
The IUCN defines a protected area as "an area of land and/or sea especially dedicated to the protection and maintenance of biological diversity, and of natural and associated cultural resources, and managed through legal or other effective means."

The Forest and Nature Conservation Act of Bhutan, 1995 defines a protected area as an area, which has been declared to be a national park, conservation area, wildlife sanctuary, wildlife reserve, nature reserve, strict nature reserve, research forest, critical watershed or other protected areas.

Over the generations, Bhutanese have managed the forest resources in a sustainable manner. A network of protected areas have been designated by the government to further conserve the environment. Protected areas in Bhutan are in the form of National Parks, Wildlife Sanctuaries, conservation area and Biological corridors. Five national Parks, four wildlife sanctuaries and a strict nature reserve spreads over various places in Bhutan.

The area and coverage percentage of the protected areas according to the Forestry Facts and Figures, 2013 is shown in the table below.

| Protected Area & Biological Corridors | Area in (km^{2}) | Percentage cover |
|---|---|---|
| Total Area Biological Corridors | 3,307.14 | 8.61 |
| Protected Area Network | 16,396.43 | 42.71 |
| Royal Botanical Park, Lampelri | 47 | 0.12 |
| Total PAs & BCs (including RBP) | 19,750.7 | 51.44 |

==== National Parks ====
| Sl. No | Name of the Protected Area | Area(km^{2}) | Existing Management Plan | Dzongkhags covered |
|---|---|---|---|---|
| 1 | Wangchuck Centennial National Park | 4914 | 2012-2017 | Bumthang, Gasa, Lhuntse, Trongsa, and Wangdue Phodrang Districts |
| 2 | Royal Manas National Park | 1057 | 2009-2014 | Pemagatshel, Sarpang, and Zhemgang Districts |
| 3 | Jigme Dorji National Park | 4316 | 2012-2017 | Gasa, Paro, Punakha, Thimphu, and Wangdue Phodrang Districts |
| 4 | Jigme Singye Wangchuck National Park | 1730 | 2014-2018 | Sarpang, Tsirang, Trongsa, Wangdue Phodrang, and Zhemgang Districts |
| 5 | Phrumsengla National Park | 905.5 | 2013-2018 | Bumthang, Lhuntse, Mongar, and Zhemgang Districts |

==== Wildlife Sanctuaries ====
| Sl. No | Name of the Protected Area | Area(km^{2}) | Existing Management Plan | Dzongkhags covered |
|---|---|---|---|---|
| 1 | Bumdeling Wildlife Sanctuary | 1520.61 | being revised | Lhuntse, Mongar, and Trashiyangtse Districts; contains the former Kulong Chu Wildlife Sanctuary |
| 2 | Jomotsangkha Wildlife Sanctuary | 334.73 | non operational | Samdrup Jongkhar District |
| 3 | Phibsoo Wildlife Sanctuary | 268.93 | 2012-2017 | Dagana and Sarpang Districts |
| 4 | Sakteng Wildlife Sanctuary | 740.6 | 2007-2012 | Trashigang and Samdrup Jongkhar Districts |

==== Strict Nature Reserve ====
| Sl. No | Name of the Protected Area | Area(km^{2}) | Existing Management Plan | Dzongkhags covered |
|---|---|---|---|---|
| 1 | Jigme Khesar Strict Nature Reserve | 609.51 | 2012-2017 | Haa and border with Samtse District |

=== Biological corridors ===
Bhutanese established biological corridors in 1999. During the establishment of the biological corridors in the country, there were 12 corridors covering a total area of 3,660 km^{2}. The biological corridors in Bhutan was declared as a "Gift to the Earth from the people of Bhutan" by Her Majesty Queen Mother Ashi Dorji Wangmo Wangchuck.

Currently, the total area covered by the eight biological corridors is 3,307.14 km^{2}. The corridors have been numbered from 1 to 8 in order to manage them effectively.

Biological corridors with their area and Districts covered
| Biological Corridor Number | Connects | Area(km^{2}) | Dzongkhags covered |
|---|---|---|---|
| BC 1 | Jigme Khesar Strict Nature Reserve - Jigme Dorji National Park | 149.75 | Haa and Paro |
| BC 2 | Jigme Dorji National Park - Jigme Singye Wangchuck National Park | 275.95 | Punakha, Thimphu and Wangdue Phodrang |
| BC3 | Phibsoo Wildlife Sanctuary - Jigme Singye Wangchuck National Park - Royal Manas National Park | 376.61 | Sarpang and Tsirang |
| BC 4 | Royal Manas National Park - Jigme Singye Wangchuck National Park - Phrumsengla National Park | 501.9 | Zhemgang and Trongsa |
| BC 5 | Royal Manas National Park - Jomotsangkha Wildlife Sanctuary | 212.13 | Pema Gatshel and Samdrup Jongkhar |
| BC 6 | Jomotsangkha Wildlife Sanctuary - Sakteng Wildlife Sanctuary | 160.38 | Samdrup Jongkhar and Trashigang |
| BC 7 | Phrumsengla National Park - Bumdeling Wildlife Sanctuary | 79.22 | Lhuntse and Mongar |
| BC 8 | Jigme Singye Wangchuck National Park - Wangchuck Centennial National Park - Jigme Dorji National Park - Bumdeling Wildlife Sanctuary / Northern Corridors | 1840.13 | Wangdue Phodrang, Trongsa, Bumthang and Lhuntse |

== Conservation Areas outside the Protected Areas System ==
The Biodiversity Action Plan, 2002 named a number of areas outside the protected areas system that are of great conservation value and require some special regulations and management interventions to ensure protection from potentially intrusive activities. These areas are multiple use areas which does not need to be under the management of the Wildlife Conservation Division.

=== Phobjikha Conservation Area ===
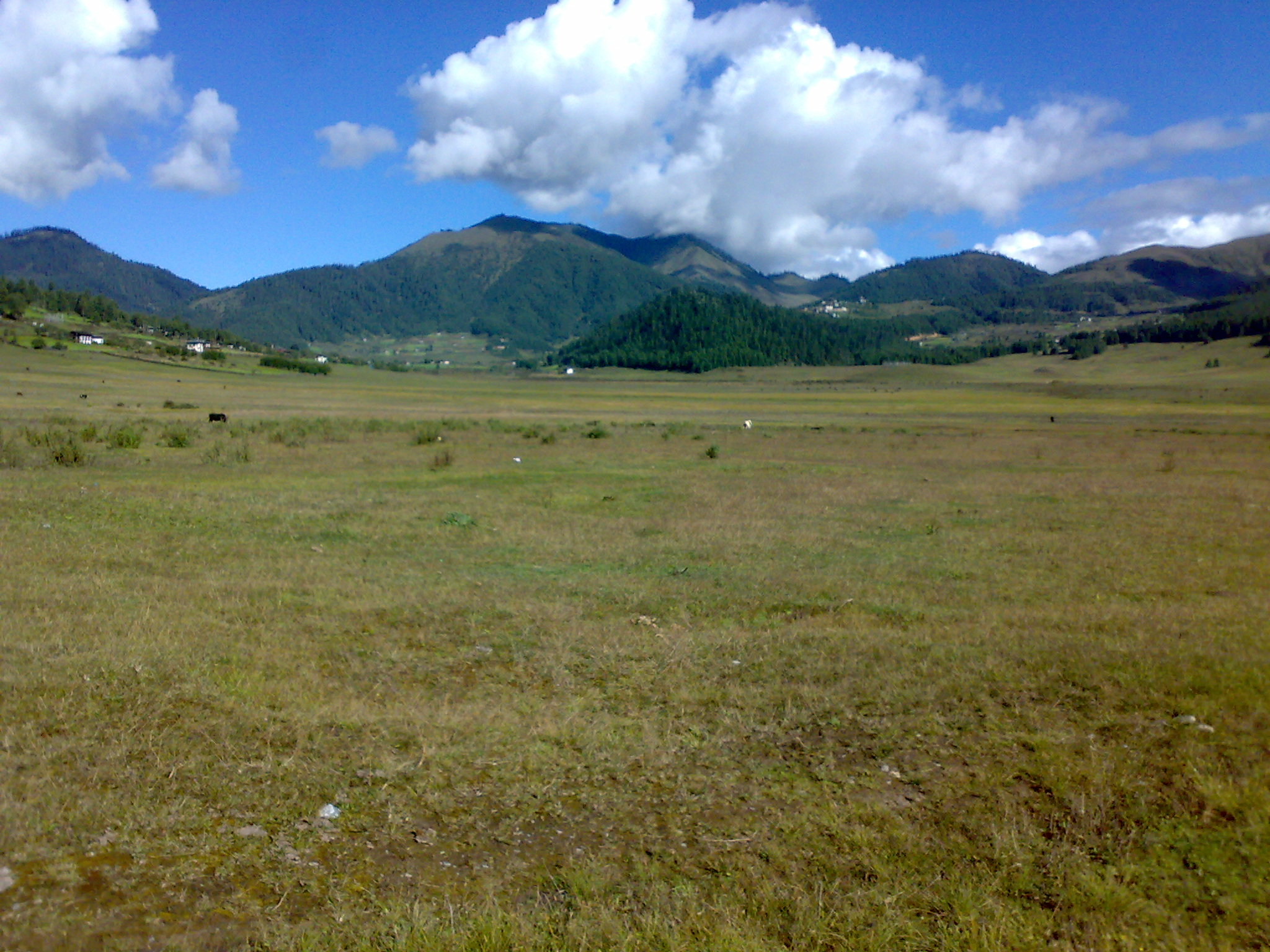
The vast area of marshland in Phobjikha which is a main winter habitat for the migratory Black-necked Cranes.

The Phobjikha Valley which lies towards the western side of the Jigme Singye Wangchuck National Park is one of the largest high-altitude wetlands of Bhutan. It is one of the most important wintering habitats for the vulnerable Black-necked Cranes.

== Sustainable Forest Management ==
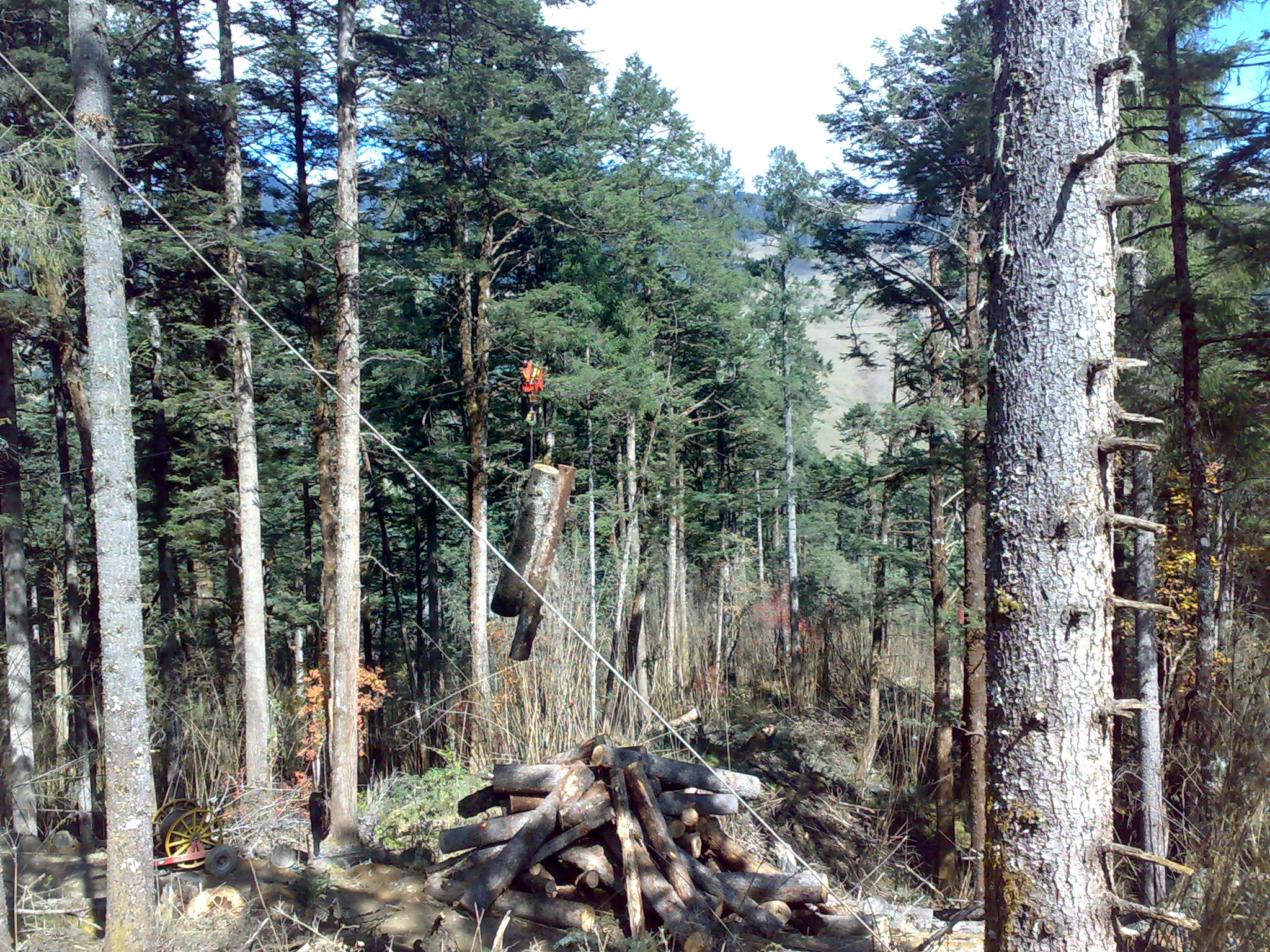
Extracting timber using WYSSEN cable crane in Dawathang FMU in Bumthang

The developmental activities in Bhutan has been increasing year by year. Developmental works increased and the demand for timber resources equally increased. In order to cater to the ever-increasing commercial demand for timber resources and for the rural purposes, the Department of Forests and Park Services of Bhutan has identified forest areas from where timber are harvested scientifically according to their management plans. The management plans were prepared by the department inline with the Forest Management Code of Bhutan, 2004. Bhutan currently has 23 areas identified as production forests. Currently there are 17 functional Forest Management Units and 6 working schemes.

=== Community Forests ===
The majority of the Bhutanese population live in the rural areas where they rely heavily on the forest resources for their basic needs. Forests provide them with products and services in the form of firewood, timber, fodder, foods, medicine, leaf litter, water for drinking and irrigation and some forests are highly revered as home of local deities. These local forest users can be resource managers.

His Majesty King Jigme Singye Wangchuck in 1979 said that "The participation of the local community is the key to conservation and utilisation of forest resources". This led to the starting of community forestry in Bhutan as government supported programme. In 1995, Her Royal Highness Ashi Sonam Chodon Wangchuck stated that "Community Forestry builds on existing local knowledge and traditional forest, management systems and develops means to devolve management responsibility for forest areas to the people that actually depend on the forest for their sustenance. "

The Forest and Nature Conservation Act of Bhutan(1995) and the revised Forest and Nature Conservation Rules of Bhutan(2003) provides legal basis for community forestry in Bhutan. Chapter IV of the Forest and Nature Conservation Rules of Bhutan (2006)deals with the Community Forestry. Dozam Community Forest was the first Community Forest established by the Department and as of 2013, there were 529 community Forests in Bhutan.

Dzongkhag wise distribution of Community Forests in Bhutan(as of June 2013)
| Dzongkhag | Number of CFs | Area(Ha) | Number of CFMG (Households) |
|---|---|---|---|
| Bumthang | 16 | 1879.89 | 529 |
| Chukha | 33 | 2455.7 | 1196 |
| Dagana | 14 | 1178.04 | 522 |
| Gasa | 7 | 452.46 | 168 |
| Haa | 15 | 1448.85 | 458 |
| Lhuntse | 21 | 1372.43 | 645 |
| Mongar | 25 | 5295.4 | 1622 |
| Paro | 25 | 4090.28 | 1463 |
| Pemagatshel | 32 | 2396.03 | 1548 |
| Punakha | 37 | 3258.22 | 1258 |
| Samdrup Jongkhar | 33 | 4612.32 | 1831 |
| Samtse | 33 | 2382.99 | 1307 |
| Sarpang | 26 | 2189.93 | 979 |
| Thimphu | 21 | 2749.63 | 837 |
| Trashigang | 43 | 7936.42 | 2388 |
| Tashiyangtse | 17 | 1780.46 | 814 |
| Trongsa | 22 | 2587.48 | 788 |
| Tsirang | 33 | 5093.95 | 2142 |
| Wangdue Phodrang | 52 | 3907.96 | 1554 |
| Zhemgang | 24 | 2595.23 | 1007 |
| Grand Total | 529 | 59663.67 | 23106 |

== Ugyen Wangchuck Institute for Conservation and Environmental Research ==
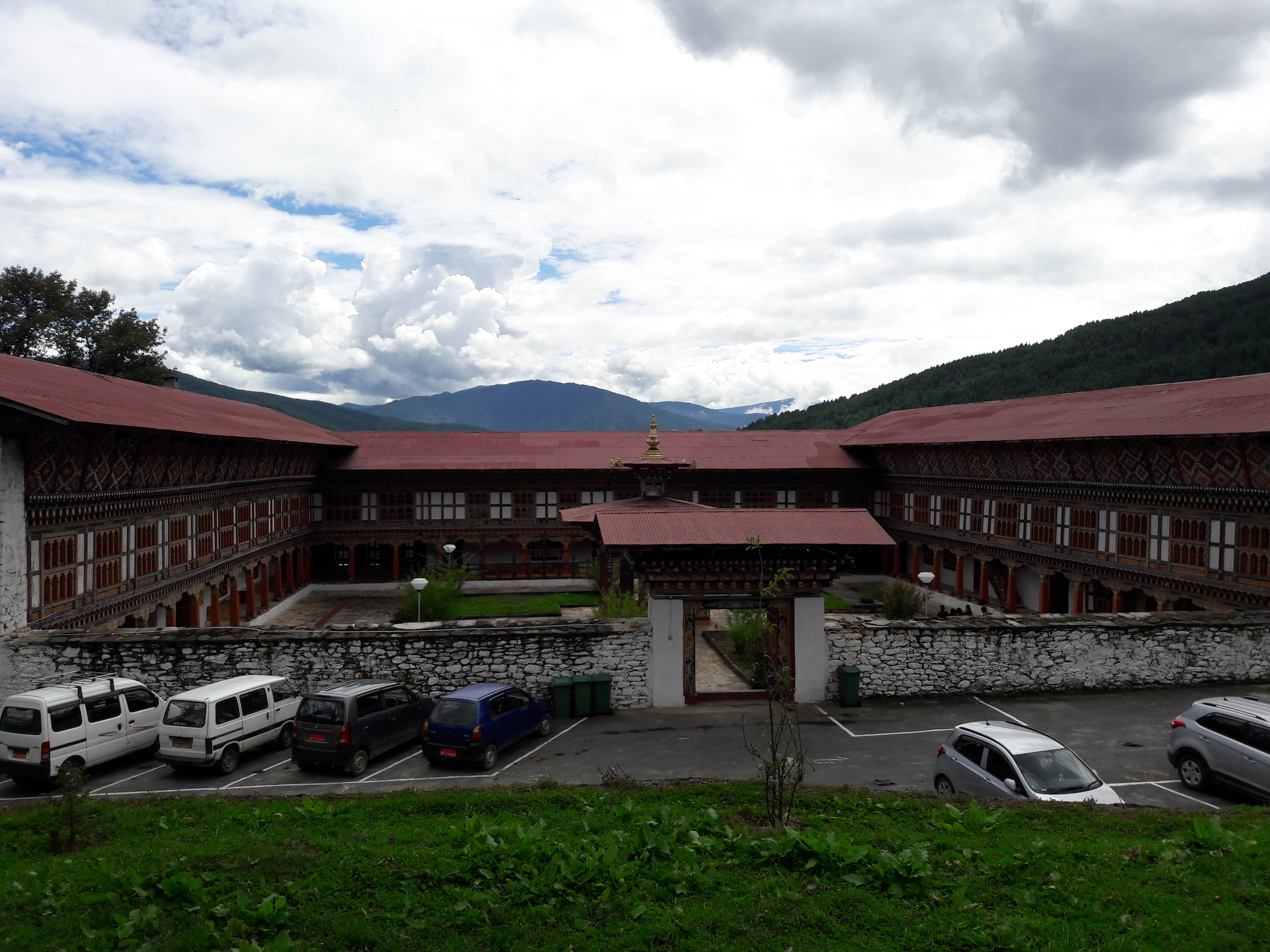
The Lamai Gonpa dzong currently houses the UWICE

The Ugyen Wangchuck Institute for Conservation and Environmental Research is a government based research training institute under the Department of Forests and Park Services of Bhutan. Currently the institute is housed in the Lamai Gonpa Dzong which was built in 1887 by the first King of Bhutan, His Majesty Ugyen Wangchuck when he was 25 years old.

== See also ==
- List of protected areas of Bhutan
- Wildlife in Bhutan
- Black-necked cranes in Bhutan
- Forestry in Bhutan
- List of Hot Springs and Mineral Springs of Bhutan
