= Environmental issues in Bhutan =

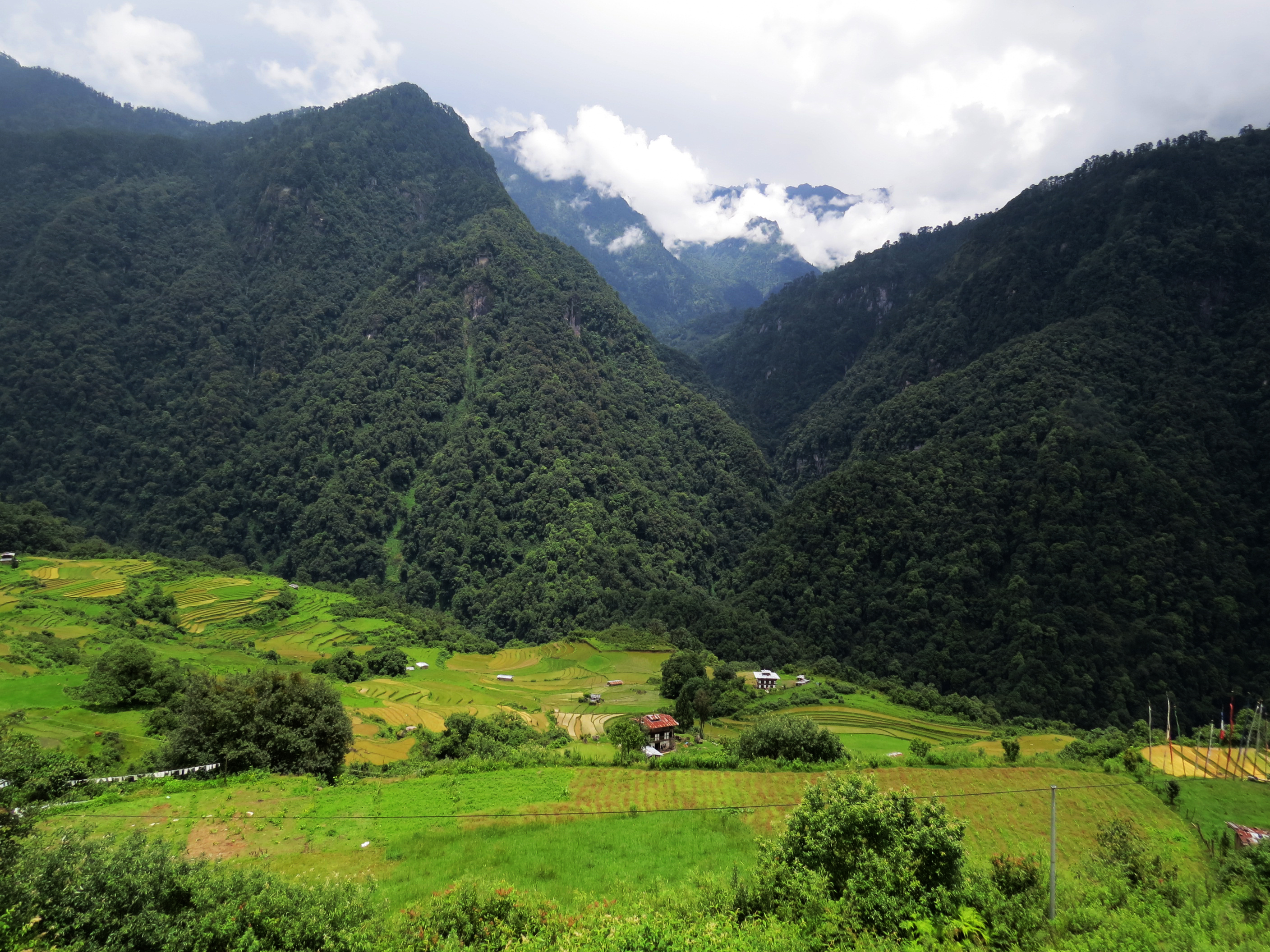
Densely forested mountains of Jigme Dorji National Park, Bhutan.

Among Bhutan's most pressing environmental issues are traditional firewood collection, crop and flock protection, and waste disposal, as well as modern concerns such as industrial pollution, wildlife conservation, and climate change that threaten Bhutan's population and biodiversity. Land and water use have also become matters of environmental concern in both rural and urban settings. In addition to these general issues, others such as landfill availability and air and noise pollution are particularly prevalent in relatively urbanized and industrialized areas of Bhutan. In many cases, the least financially and politically empowered find themselves the most affected by environmental issues.

Through 2011, Bhutan experienced accelerated economic activities which pressured natural resources such as land, air, and water. Development activities increased urbanization, industrialization, mining and quarrying, agriculture, and solid waste management projects. Land degradation, biodiversity and habitat loss, high fuel-wood consumption, and human-wildlife conflicts are some of Bhutan's environmental challenges. Notwithstanding these problems, Bhutan remains overall carbon-neutral, and a net sink for greenhouse gases.

Within the Bhutanese government, the independent National Environment Commission (NEC) and Bhutan Trust Fund, as well as the executive Ministries of Health (for chemical and radioactive waste), Economic Affairs, and Agriculture and Forests (Department of Forestry Services) are tasked with addressing environmental issues. Waste disposal issues often fall to local governments, Bhutan's dzongkhags and thromdes. Non-governmental agencies active in addressing environmental issues in Bhutan are the Royal Society for the Protection of Nature (RSPN), the only domestic environmental NGO, and the World Wildlife Fund (WWF).

== National issues ==
To address environmental issues, the government of Bhutan has banned certain practices with varying success. Tsheri agriculture, especially prevalent among Sharchops and Lhotshampa, is a practice by which land is cleared and farmed intensively until it becomes unproductive and is thereafter let fallow. Because it is particularly environmentally harmful, the practice has been banned by the government since 1969, however it continues today. In the mid-1980s, it accounted for 32 percent of the agricultural land use and about 3 percent of the total land use. In the early 1990s, Bhutan imposed a ban on timber exports, though domestic timber harvesting remains heavily regulated under a network of foresters and road checkpoints. In April 1999, Bhutan also prohibited plastic bags nationwide. The ban on plastic bags, however, has proven a daunting challenge in implementation and enforcement because of the practicality of lightweight airtight storage and a lack of feasible alternatives.

Besides tsheri agriculture, other traditional practices have drawn concern for the environment. Throughout Bhutan, dependence on firewood as a fuel source has been historically prevalent. Before hydroelectric power and other modern energy sources became available, the source of fuel for heating, cooking, and lighting was nearly exclusively firewood. The provision of electricity, as well as better regulation of fuelwood collectors and more aggressive reforestation projects, was seen in the 1980s as a key factor in forest conservation. Because affordable electricity was not available throughout the country, the government established fuelwood plantations near villages to accommodate daily needs and to promote forest conservation. Firewood harvesting and management remains one of Bhutan's leading environmental challenges; the kingdom is one of the world's leaders in firewood consumption at a rate of 2.8 cubic metres (99 ft^{3}) per annum and accounts for 80 percent of the kingdom's energy consumption.

Across Bhutan, traditional farmers and grazers have continued to face human-wildlife conflicts such as crop and livestock depredation. These conflicts are complicated by problems of overgrazing and wildlife protection. Protected wildlife have entered agricultural areas, trampling crops and killing livestock. In response, the government has implemented an insurance scheme, begun constructing solar powered alarm fences, watch towers, search lights, and has provided fodder and salt licks outside human settlement areas to encourage animals to stay away. Some local farmers have begun planting crops of molasses grass in an effort to repel primates naturally. Bhutan has also sought assistance from the United Nations Development Programme in combatting crop and livestock losses.

Industrialization in particular has been cited as an environmental hurdle and foil to Gross National Happiness, the guiding principle of the government and Constitution of Bhutan. As Bhutan industrializes, ordinary citizens have faced increased competition for essential resources and amenities – from water to roads – with the industries that benefit from Bhutan's nearby development projects. While residents express frustration at the diminution in health and lifestyle, industrial operators point out that in Bhutan the provision of health benefits is the role of the government.

Pasakha, in Phuentsholing, is a major industrial center and has been the focus of many industry-related environmental issues brought since Bhutan began its development programs in the 1960s. Bhutan has planned an industrial waste repository in Pasakha, Phuentsholing, to receive slag, microsilica powder, and gases emitted by steel, ferroalloy and carbide industries. The repository at Bhutan's largest industrial site was initially slated for completion in July 2011.

== Air pollution ==
Since 2006, significant air pollution, largely attributed to external sources in India, has manifested in a brown haze in the atmosphere above Bhutan. This air pollution resulted in decreased crop output and increased concerns about public health. Bhutan's four cement plants have been cited as some of the most prevalent causes of domestic air pollution, with three out of four running without modern emission controls. Semiannual NEC site visits check for compliance with existing regulation and may impose relatively trivial fines, however living conditions remained poor due to dust. Enforcement has been portrayed as lax in Bhutanese media, and complaints by some residents around the Pasakha industrial center went unaddressed.

Through 2011, many thromdes and smaller villages in Bhutan had pits or areas for burning refuse due to a lack of designated landfills or disposal sites. The practice increases ambient air pollution as well as air and ground toxicity.

In 2011, the NEC began setting up stations to monitor air quality in Thimphu, Kanglung, Pasakha and Rinchending.

== Biodiversity ==
Biodiversity, a hallmark of Bhutan, is threatened by human activity and climate change. To address these problems, the Royal Government began setting aside protected areas in the 1960s. Since 1992, protected areas of Bhutan have been managed by the Bhutan Trust Fund for Environmental Conservation under the Ministry of Agriculture, Forestry Services Division. In 1993, the Fund revised and reduced its extensive parks system for better ecological representation and management. Through 2008, however, protected areas expanded significantly with the establishment of Wangchuck Centennial Park, spanning a 4,914 square kilometres (1,897 sq mi) swath in northern Bhutan. The parks and sanctuaries are all connected either directly or by "biological corridors." Bhutan is regarded by some as the best example in the world of setting aside a high proportion of a country's area to maintain the ecologies of protected areas – by constructing corridors – without financial consequences, as reviewed by Wangchuk 2007 and reflected in the study of Lham et al. 2019. As of 2011, the Fund had recruited 189 field staff, had trained 24 post-graduate specialists, and had provided over 300 short scientific courses. The Fund alone manages a total protected area of 16,396.43 square kilometres (6,330.70 sq mi) – nearly the size of Eswatini and more than 42 percent of Bhutan's total 38,394 square kilometres (14,824 sq mi). With the exception of Phibsoo Wildlife Sanctuary and Torsa Strict Nature Reserve, these protected areas are inhabited or are located within populated areas. By 2011, human development and illegal activities such as habitat destruction and poaching threaten to wipe out endangered species, including the white bellied heron, one of the country's rarest birds.

Poaching in Bhutan is an environmental issue both within the kingdom and at its borders. Many species are poached for their alleged medicinal properties. Though protected within Bhutan, wildlife products including rhinoceros horn, tiger bones, musk, and cordyceps sinensis command high prices outside the kingdom. Although porous borders are blamed for trafficking in poached wildlife, some protected species such as cordyceps have their own markets within Bhutan.

== Climate change ==
Bhutan has faced ongoing and immediate climate change since the late twentieth century. Tangible climate change has resulted in the warming and recession of many of Bhutan's glaciers, increasing the frequency and severity of glacial lake outburst floods (GLOFs). Bhutan has also seen a shift in agriculture patterns due to climate change, prompting concern over the stability of agriculture in Bhutan.

=== Glacier retreat and GLOFs ===
Where glacial movement temporarily blocks riverflows, downstream areas may be threatened by GLOFs. Although GLOFs are not a new phenomenon in Bhutan, their frequency has risen in the past three decades. Significant GLOFs occurred in 1957, 1960, 1968 and 1994, devastating lives and property downstream. According to the Bhutan Department of Energy however, the majority of rivers in Bhutan are more susceptible to fluctuation with changing rainfall patterns than to flooding directly attributable to glacier or snow melt.

Because the state of glaciers in Bhutan involves questions of climate change, the topic is somewhat controversial. A 2008 United Nations report suggested that due to rising temperatures, glaciers in Bhutan were retreating at a rate of 30–40 meters per year, poised to make many lakes burst their banks and send millions of gallons of floodwater downstream. This among many other climate-related issues identified in the report prompted the regional association of government ministers to establish the Southeast Asia Regional Health Emergency Fund in Thimphu in September 2007. Similarly, the member nations of South Asian Association for Regional Cooperation (SAARC) adopted bilateral agreements including measures on climate change and glaciers at its summit in April 2010.

The 2008 UN report also indicated Himalayan glaciers would melt within 25 years, however Prime Minister Jigme Thinley expressed a more dim outlook in a press conference in late March 2010, stating, "Our glaciers are withdrawing very fast and we have reasons to worry that they may in fact disappear not in 2035, but even earlier." Further studies in 2009 indicated the rate of glacial melt in Bhutan was three times the world average, and that over the previous three decades regional temperatures had risen by 2.7 °C (36.9 °F). Satellite imaging also confirmed changes in glaciers and snow peaks, indicating increased runoff and decreased coverage. However, opinions varied on the effect of global warming in the Himalaya. According to US geological survey report, 66 glaciers in Bhutan have decreased by 8.1 percent in the last 30 years. On the other hand, a study whose results were published in 2011 indicated glacial melt depended on several factors including debris cover, and that more than half of the glaciers in the Himalaya were stable or were in fact growing. Debris cover, such as rocks and mud, set apart the relatively stable glaciers of the Himalaya from the pristine glaciers of the Tibetan Plateau, currently in fast retreat. The study, conducted by the Universities of California and Potsdam and published in the journal Nature Geoscience, was based on 286 glaciers along the Himalaya and Hindu Kush from Bhutan to the Afghanistan-Pakistan border. Another preliminary survey conducted by a team of Japanese and Bhutanese scientists, including a glacio-microbiologist, glacio-ecologist and geologist, indicated that the presence of a peculiar microorganism on the surfaces of glaciers could accelerate glacial melting and eventually lead to a glacial outburst.

=== Agriculture ===
In the early 21st century, Bhutanese farmers first experienced agricultural fluctuations due to climate change, including higher temperatures, prolonged seasons, and increased erosion due to retreating glaciers in Bhutan. Double harvests in late autumn prevent production of a single mature crop and raise the specter of reduced yields in the following summer. Similar patterns in neighboring Indian regions project yield losses between 10 and 40 percent due to these changes. Some Bhutanese had changed crops as a result of these environmental changes.

== Forestry ==
Through the late 20th century, Bhutan's low population and the general absence of overdevelopment contributed to its forest preservation. Because of terrain, more accessible forests had been overcut whereas remote forests remained largely in their natural state through the early 1990s. A progressive government-sponsored forestry conservation policy strove to balance revenue needs with ecological considerations, water management, and soil preservation. Success in managing its forest resources had long been critical to the local environment and economy and also affected downstream floodplains in India and Bangladesh. The Department of Forestry was established in 1952 to oversee conservation and exploitation of the country's significant forestry resources.

Forestry resource exploitation increased with the start of the First Development Plan in 1961. Uncontrolled felling of trees in the 1970s by private companies in logging areas and by rural populations along roads and in main valleys stripped hillsides and caused serious erosion. Tsheri cultivation, forest fires, and overgrazing also contributed to the degradation of Bhutan's forestry resource. In 1981 some 3.3 million hectares, or between 70 and 74 percent of the land, were forested, but in 1991 foreign estimates indicated a shrinking forest of only 60 to 64 percent of the land. Even more conservative estimates indicated that closer to 50 percent of Bhutan's territory still was forested in the late 1980s, and about 15 percent of GDP was produced through the nation's important forest industry.

Recognizing the potential value of its forestry resource, Bhutan became increasingly conscientious about forestry management in the 1970s. Starting in 1977, the World Wildlife Fund began supporting Bhutan's forest management through organizing forest ranger training programs, supplying funds for forest boundary demarcation, building guard posts, and constructing a patrol road for what was later to be designated the Royal Manas National Park. Bhutan rejected World Bank aid to build a major dam on the Manas Chhu in 1986 that would have flooded this major conservation area on the southern Bhutan-India border. By 1989 Bhutan had developed nine other forest and wildlife preserves, also mostly along the southern border with India. In the face of increasing denuded hillsides, private logging was banned, and strict standards for public-sector logging operations were established in 1979. Farmers were warned against burning off forests to clear land for tsheri cultivation, and Forest Guards were trained in increasing numbers to help preserve the valuable resources. Surveying, demarcation, conservation, and management plans for harvesting forest products were part of the Fifth Development Plan's focus on forestry preservation. Wildlife sanctuaries also were developed. One of the immediate results of forestry sector regulation, however, was a sharp decrease in revenues since the late 1970s. In 1991 the government, with assistance from UNDP and the World Wildlife Fund, established a trust fund for environmental conservation. Initially in the amount of US$20 million, the UNDP-administered fund was aimed at producing up to US$1 million per year for training in forestry and ecology, surveying forests, reviewing and implementing management plans for protected areas, and supporting government environmental offices, public awareness programs, and integrated conservation and development programs. Modernly, domestic timber harvesting remains legal though subject to strict regulation and inspection.

Bhutan had a 2018 Forest Landscape Integrity Index mean score of 8.85/10, ranking it 16th globally out of 172 countries.

== Urban environments ==
Bhutan faces challenges in its urban environments due to increased urbanization, industrialization, and economic development. Through 2011, many relatively urban areas lacked designated landfills and effective waste disposal systems, prompting residents to burn garbage, dump it, or simply throw it off a cliff. In 2012 unsound disposal of waste reached 52% of generated waste.

Though passed in 2009, regulation under the Waste Prevention and Management Act was finalized in 2011. The regulations aimed to cover refuse segregation, including industrial, chemical, radioactive, and electronic waste, which theretofore were mixed with general refuse. The 2011 regulation also prohibited landfills and dumping within national parks, protected areas, biological corridors, and human settlements. With its relatively high population and powerful local government, the urban thromde of Thimphu has often been at the forefront of urban environmental issues in Bhutan.

=== Urban waste ===
As of 2011, Thimphu alone produced some 51 tonnes (8,000 st) of waste daily, at an average household output of 0.96 kilograms (2.1 lb); this represented a nearly threefold increase over the three prior years. Thimphu thromde authorities estimated 49 percent of Thimphu's total refuse was biodegradable organic waste; 25.3 percent was paper; 13.7 percent was plastics; and 3.6 percent was glass. The capital's only designated dumping site, Memelakha Landfill, met its capacity in 2002, leading to overflowing and illegal dumping there and at other sites around Thimphu. Through 2009, the government reaction was a "polluters pay" policy that failed to achieve its desired results. To more effectively approach refuse issues and to address different varieties of waste, Thimphu began a subsidized pilot project for sorting between biodegradable and non-biodegradable refuse. Thimphu municipal authorities also addressed the ubiquitous plastic in its refuse with a shredder for PET bottles to facilitate transport to recycling in India. Still, compliance with proper waste disposal remained a challenge within all segments, from street vendors to ordinary citizens.

In the late 2000s, Thimphu experienced steady growth despite water shortages. Areas downstream from Thimphu along the Wangchu River deteriorated significantly because of human waste and refuse. In a November 2011 effort to combat downstream degradation, waste outlets were converted into collection chambers, and refuse collection programs were instituted in the area.

In some areas with designated dumping sites, the distance to landfills makes them less practical than illegally dumping by the wayside or into rivers. As a result, communities outside urban areas suffer consequences of discarding refuse into the common water supply, increasing the demand for alternative water sources. Villages near designated open air landfills and burning sites likewise report pollution and toxicity from runoff, as well as excess scavenger activity, posing health hazards.

=== Noise pollution ===
With the advent of loudspeakers, headphones, and rumbling engines, noise pollution has been identified in Bhutanese media as an environmental concern, citing negative potentials ranging from distraction to deafness.

=== Water use ===
Competition for water use between residents and industry, as well as drying water sources, are actual and imminent environmental issues facing residents in Bhutan. Water shortages have become a widespread phenomenon in rural settlements, and as internal resettlement produces new villages, many there also face water shortages. In addition, urbanization and shifts in land ownership, including land pooling, have complicated matters of water access in Thimphu.

In smaller settlements, infrastructure including water and waste management remained underdeveloped through 2011.

== See also ==
- Climate of Bhutan
- Energy in Bhutan
- Health in Bhutan
- List of protected areas of Bhutan
- Royal Society for the Protection of Nature, Bhutan
