= Forestry in Bhutan =

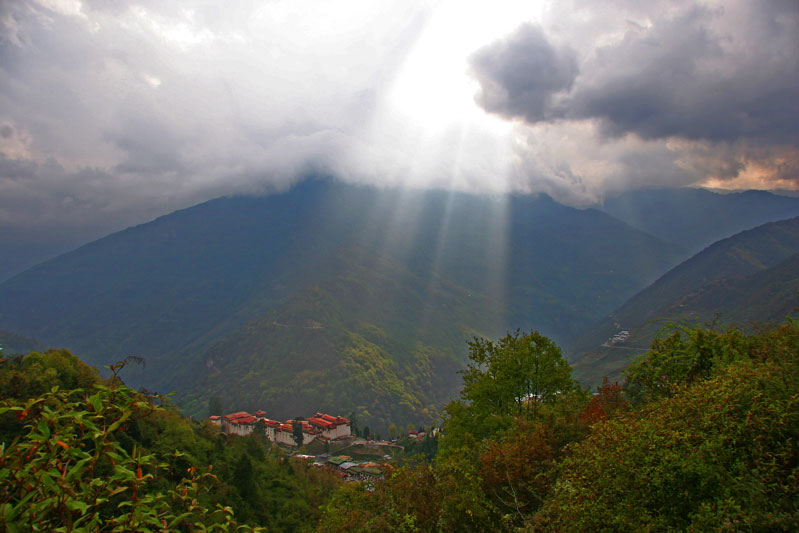
Trongsa Dzong in Bhutan.

One of Bhutan's significant natural resources in the late twentieth century was its rich forests and natural vegetation. Bhutan's location in the eastern Himalayas, with its subtropical plains and alpine terrain, gives it more rainfall than its neighbors to the west, a factor greatly facilitating forest growth. The forests contain numerous deciduous and evergreen species, ranging from tropical hardwoods to predominantly oak and pine forests.

== Conservation ==
The small population and the general absence of overdevelopment in Bhutan contributed to forest preservation. Because of the terrain, the more accessible forests had been overcut whereas remote forests remained largely in their natural state. A progressive government-sponsored forestry conservation policy strove to balance revenue needs with ecological considerations, water management, and soil preservation. Success in managing its forest resources had long been critical to the local environment and economy and also affected downstream floodplains in India and Bangladesh.

The Department of Forests and Park Services was established in 1952 as the Department of Forestry to oversee conservation and exploitation of the country's significant forestry resources. After an initial decade of development, forestry resource exploitation increased with the start of the First Development Plan in 1961. Uncontrolled felling of trees in the 1970s by private companies in logging areas and by rural populations along roads and in main valleys stripped hillsides and caused serious erosion. Tsheri cultivation, forest fires, and overgrazing also contributed to the degradation of the forestry resource.

In 1971 the Forestry School was established at Kalikhola in southern Bhutan. It was moved to Taba in the northern Thimphu Valley in 1977. The school provided basic instruction in forestry and forest management and trained foresters and Forest Guards.

In 1981 some 33,000 km², or between 70 and 74 percent of the land, were forested, but in 1991 foreign estimates indicated a shrinking forest of only 60 to 64 percent of the land. Even more conservative estimates indicated that closer to 50 percent of Bhutan's territory still was forested in the late 1980s, and about 15 percent of GDP was produced through the nation's important forest industry.

According to UN statistics, in the decade between 1978 and 1987 Bhutan harvested an average of nearly 3.2 million cubic meters of roundwood and produced 5,000 cubic meters of sawn wood per year. Of this total, nearly 80 percent was for commercial use (paper pulp, veneers, plywood, particle board, and firewood), and the remainder was for housing construction and public works.

== Conscientious Forestry ==
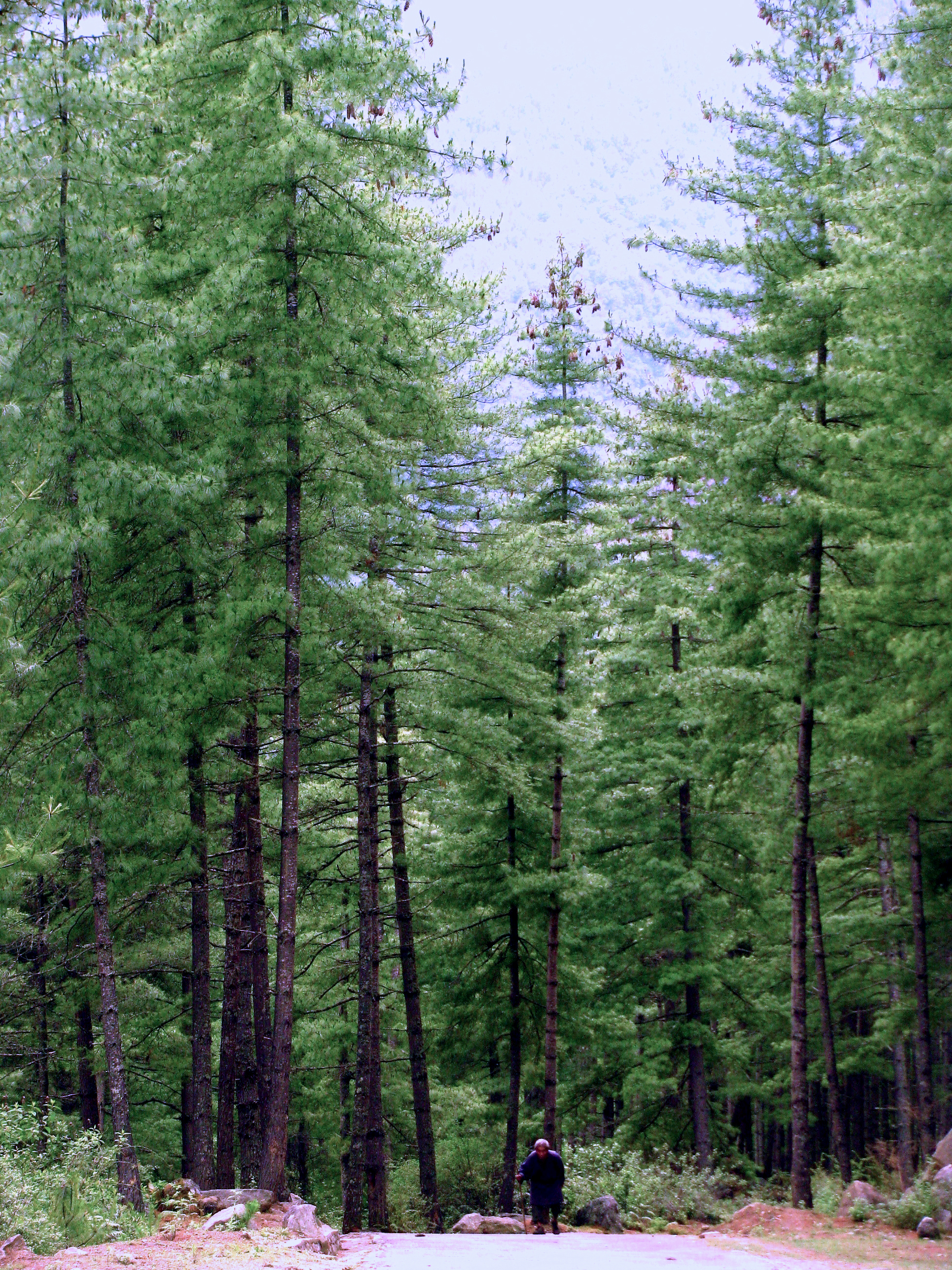
Pinus wallichiana forest, Paro, Punakha, Taktshang, Bhutan.

Before hydroelectric power and other modern energy sources were available, wood was the almost exclusive source of fuel for heating, cooking, and lighting. The provision of electricity, as well as better regulation of fuelwood collectors and more aggressive reforestation projects, was seen in the 1980s as a key factor in forest conservation. Because affordable electricity was not available throughout the country, the government established fuelwood plantations near villages to accommodate daily needs and to promote forest conservation.

Recognizing the potential value of its forestry resource, Bhutan became increasingly conscientious about forestry management in the 1970s. Starting in 1977, the World Wildlife Fund began supporting Bhutan's forest management through organizing forest ranger training programs, supplying funds for forest boundary demarcation, building guard posts, and constructing a patrol road for what was later to be designated the Royal Manas National Park. Bhutan rejected World Bank aid to build a major dam on the Manas Chhu in 1986 that would have flooded this major conservation area on the southern Bhutan-India border. By 1989 Bhutan had developed nine other forest and wildlife preserves, also mostly along the southern border with India.

== Banning & Standards ==
In the face of increasing denuded hillsides, private logging was banned, and strict standards for public-sector logging operations were established in 1979. Farmers were warned against burning off forests to clear land for tsheri cultivation, and Forest Guards were trained in increasing numbers to help preserve the valuable resources. Surveying, demarcation, conservation, and management plans for harvesting forest products were part of the Fifth Development Plan's focus on forestry preservation. Wildlife sanctuaries also were developed.

One of the immediate results of forestry sector regulation was a sharp decrease in revenues since the late 1970s. In 1991 the government, with assistance from UNDP and the World Wildlife Fund, established a trust fund for environmental conservation. Initially in the amount of US$20 million, the UNDP-administered fund was aimed at producing up to US$1 million per year for training in forestry and ecology, surveying forests, reviewing and implementing management plans for protected areas, and supporting government environmental offices, public awareness programs, and integrated conservation and development programs.

== Tree cover extent and loss ==
Global Forest Watch publishes annual estimates of tree cover loss and 2000 tree cover extent derived from time-series analysis of Landsat satellite imagery in the Global Forest Change dataset. In this framework, tree cover refers to vegetation taller than 5 m (including natural forests and tree plantations), and tree cover loss is defined as the complete removal of tree cover canopy for a given year, regardless of cause.

For Bhutan, country statistics report cumulative tree cover loss of 27,399 ha (273.99 km^{2}) from 2001 to 2024 (about 1.1% of its 2000 tree cover area). For tree cover density greater than 30%, country statistics report a 2000 tree cover extent of 2,577,237 ha (25,772.37 km^{2}). The charts and table below display this data. In simple terms, the annual loss number is the area where tree cover disappeared in that year, and the extent number shows what remains of the 2000 tree cover baseline after subtracting cumulative loss. Forest regrowth is not included in the dataset.

Annual tree cover loss in Bhutan, 2001–2024. View chart definition.
Tree cover extent in 2000 minus cumulative tree cover loss in Bhutan, 2001–2024 (loss-only residual; does not account for gain). View chart definition.

Annual tree cover extent and loss
Year	Tree cover extent (km2) (Note: This residual measure does not include forest regrowth.)	Annual tree cover loss (km2)
2001	25,769.40	2.97
2002	25,767.16	2.24
2003	25,761.72	5.44
2004	25,751.58	10.14
2005	25,743.88	7.70
2006	25,737.65	6.23
2007	25,732.56	5.09
2008	25,724.80	7.76
2009	25,713.04	11.76
2010	25,669.50	43.54
2011	25,658.59	10.91
2012	25,650.92	7.67
2013	25,646.07	4.85
2014	25,633.77	12.30
2015	25,626.29	7.48
2016	25,606.67	19.62
2017	25,586.95	19.72
2018	25,574.55	12.40
2019	25,566.35	8.20
2020	25,553.47	12.88
2021	25,540.69	12.78
2022	25,528.21	12.48
2023	25,510.25	17.96
2024	25,498.38	11.87

== REDD+ reference levels and forest monitoring ==
Bhutan has submitted a national forest reference emission level (FREL) and forest reference level (FRL) under the UNFCCC REDD+ framework. On the UNFCCC REDD+ Web Platform, the country’s 2020 submission is listed as having an assessed reference level; a national forest monitoring system is listed as reported, while a national strategy and safeguards information are listed as “not reported”.

The technical assessment of Bhutan’s 2020 submission reported a national FREL for the historical reference period 2005–2014 of 505,837 t CO2 eq per year and a national FRL of −8,539,085 t CO2 eq per year after revision during the assessment process. The FREL was defined as the annual average of gross emissions from deforestation, while the FRL was defined as the annual average of combined net removals from sustainable management of forests, conservation of forest carbon stocks and enhancement of forest carbon stocks. The assessment also noted that forest degradation was not reported as a separate REDD+ activity because Bhutan treated it as being implicitly captured under sustainable management and conservation activities, and that the FREL included a small upward adjustment because Bhutan was treated as a high-forest, low-deforestation country.

Bhutan’s submission used a national forest definition of land larger than 0.5 hectares with trees taller than 5 metres and canopy cover above 10%. It included above-ground biomass, below-ground biomass, deadwood, litter and soil organic carbon, and the technical assessment noted that non-CO_{2} emissions accounted for about 43 per cent of emissions during the reference period. The benchmark drew on Bhutan’s national forest inventory, which used 2,424 cluster plots, together with Landsat-based land-use mapping; the technical assessment reported combined uncertainty of 23.95% for the FREL and 11.53% for the FRL.

== See also ==
- Environmental issues in Bhutan
- Protected areas of Bhutan
