= Royal Society for the Protection of Nature, Bhutan =

Logo

The Royal Society for the Protection of Nature (RSPN) (Dzongkha: རྒྱལ་འཛིན་རང་བཞིན་སྲུང་སྐྱོབ་ཚོགས་སྡེ་; Wylie: Rgyal-'dzin Rang-bzhin Srung-skyob Tshogs-sde; Gyäzin Rangzhin Rungchop Tshogde) is Bhutan's first and only non-governmental organization nonprofit organization with nationwide operations.

Since its establishment in 1987, the RSPN has promoted environmental education and advocacy, conservation and sustainable livelihoods, research and emerging issues like climate change, water and solid waste. The Society was registered under the Companies Act of Bhutan until last quarter of 2009 without proper authority which regulated the non-profit organization, with a special clause on non-profit entity. With the establishment of Civil Society Authority of Bhutan, the Society is now registered Civil Society Organization Authority as one of the Public Benefit Organizations under Bhutanese law. The RSPN celebrated its Silver Jubilee on 24 October 2012.

== Activities ==
The RSPN is active in research and conservation of endangered species. RSPN has been working in Phobjika Valley, Wangdue Phodrang District, home to the endangered black-necked crane (Grus nigricollis) for over two decades to conserve the black necked crane and at the same time to promote sustainable livelihoods of the people there. This valley contains wildlife corridors connecting Jigme Singye Wangchuck National Park with other protected areas of Bhutan, however most of the area is not under official government protection. To meet the environmental and social needs, RSPN initiated projects to promote sustainable ecotourism, alternative energy, gender and water, waste management, wetland conservation, organic farming, income generating options such as souvenir making, and in the conservation of forest resources in close collaboration with the Department of Forest and Park Services.

RSPN extended its program to Wamrong and Kangpara communities in Trashigang District and in Zhemgang District focused to community based natural resource management and sustainable livelihoods of the people.

Under the Environmental Education and Advocacy Program, the RSPN is a collaboration with the Ministry of Education established school based nature club in all the schools across the country. Nature clubs are active in creating environmental awareness in the school and in communities around.

To support the nature club program, RSPN developed and distributed a nature club activity manual and nature club management guide books. Over 1,000 teachers were trained to manage nature club activities in schools. In consultation with the Royal University of Bhutan, the RSPN introduced environmental studies modules in the teacher training colleges of Samtse and Paro. RSPN also extended its environmental education program to the monastic schools. Environmental education materials were developed and monks and nuns were trained to conduct conservation activities.

== See also ==
- Black-necked cranes in Bhutan
- Environmental issues in Bhutan
- Phobjika Valley
- Protected areas of Bhutan
