= Lingzhi Yügyal Dzong =

Monastery and fortress in Bhutan

Coordinates: 27°51′24.66″N 89°25′57.33″E

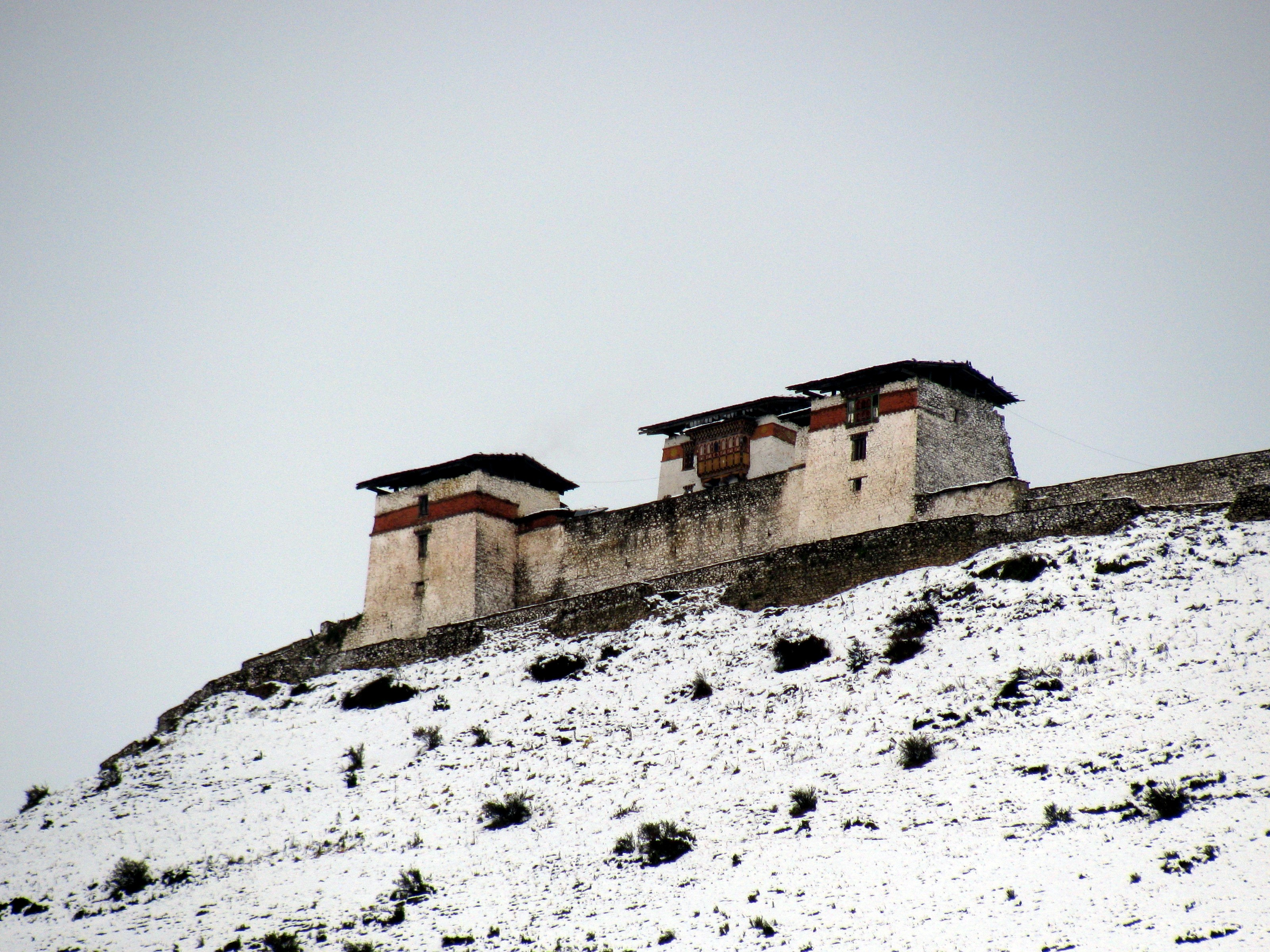
Lingzhi Yügyal Dzong, Bhutan

Lingzhi Yügyal Dzong, is an important Drukpa Kagyu monastery and administrative center situated at an altitude of 4150 metres in Lingzhi, Thimphu District, Bhutan. There are about thirty monks headed by a Lama Neten (head of a district monastic body) resident in the Dzong. The office of the Drungpa (sub-district administrator) is also housed in the Dzong.

== History ==
The Dzong was built in 1668 by the third Desi of Bhutan, Chögyal Minjur Tenpa (r. 1667-1680) to commemorate victory over a Tibetan invasion and named Yügyal Dzong. It controlled the border between Tibet and Bhutan and was one of the main defensive fortresses in the north of Bhutan.

The Dzong was partly damaged by an earthquake in 1867. In the 1950s the building was reconstructed and used as administrative centre. Renovation work on the Dzong began in 2005 and was still ongoing in 2010.

== See also ==
- Geography of Bhutan
- Religion in Bhutan
- Transport in Bhutan

== Sources ==
- Thinley, Lopon Kunzang; KMT Research Group (2008). Seeds of Faith: A Comprehensive Guide to the Sacred Places of Bhutan. Volume 1. Thimphu: KMT Publications. pp. 192–3. ISBN 99936-22-41-9.
