= Wangchuck Centennial National Park =

National Park of Bhutan

Coordinates: 27°48′43″N 90°39′28″E

- IUCN category II (national park)
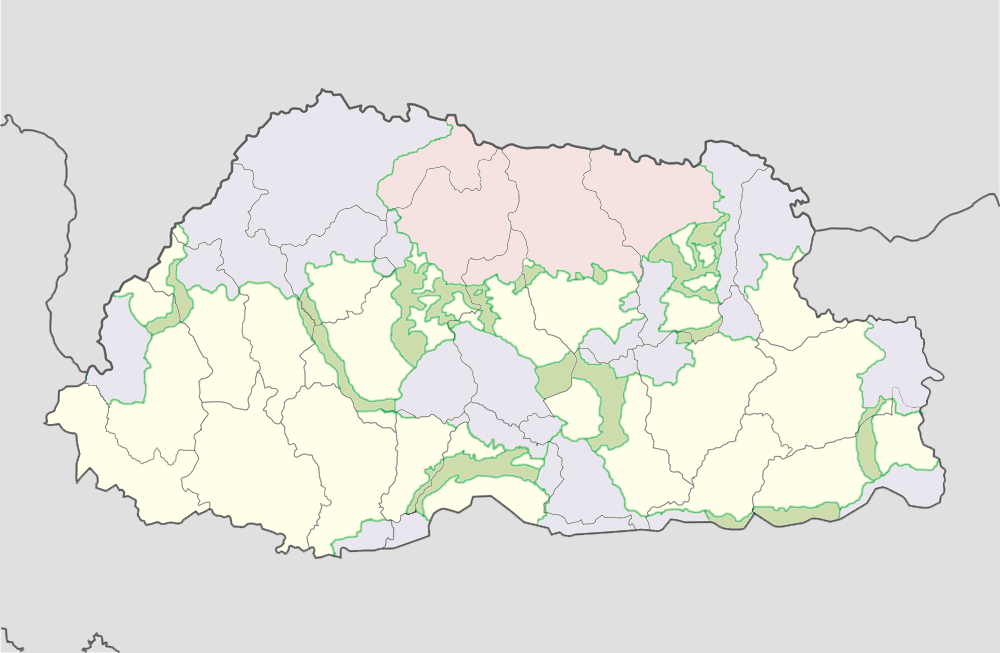
- Location of Wangchuck Centennial National Park in pink
- Location: Bumthang, Gasa, Lhuntse, Trongsa, Wangdue Phodrang, Bhutan
- Nearest city: Jakar
- Area: 4,914 km^{2} (1,897 sq mi)
- Min. elevation: 2500
- Authorized: 10-06-2008
- Established: 2008
- Named for: House of Wangchuck
- Governing body: Department of Forests and Park Services of Bhutan
- Website: Wangchuck Centennial National Park

Wangchuck Centennial National Park in northern Bhutan is the kingdom's largest national park, spanning 4,914 square kilometres (1,897 sq mi) over five districts, occupying significant portions of northern Bumthang, Lhuntse, and Wangdue Phodrang Districts. It borders Tibet to the north and is bound by tributaries of the Wong Chhu (Raidāk) basin to the west. Wangchuck Centennial directly abuts Jigme Dorji National Park, Bumdeling Wildlife Sanctuary, and Phrumsengla National Park in northern Bhutan, and is further connected to Jigme Singye Wangchuck National Park in central Bhutan via biological corridors. Thus, most of northern Bhutan is part of these protected areas.

Wangchuck Centennial was established on December 12, 2008 in honor of the Wangchuck dynasty, founded in 1907. It contains headwaters of four major river systems: Punatsang Chhu/Sankosh River, Mangde Chhu, Chamkhar Chhu, and Kuri Chhu. Wangchuck Centennial also contains the various middle-Himalayan ecological biomes, ranging from blue pine forests to alpine meadows, at altitudes from 2,500 metres (8,200 ft) to 5,100 metres (16,700 ft).

== Administration ==
=== Head office ===
The National Park Head Office is located at Nasiphel in the upper Chamkhar Chu basin in Bumthang District. It can be reachable by a 22km farmroad from Chamkhar town in Bumthang.

=== Field Offices ===
To cater to the large area the park covers, three range offices and two guard posts are established.

== Flora and fauna ==
=== Flora ===
During a survey in October 2008, a total of 693 species of vascular plants were recorded from the National Park.

=== Fauna ===
==== Mammals ====
The park is known to be home to a total of 43 species of mammals and of which 8 are totally protected in Bhutan. This includes the Royal Bengal Tiger, Snow Leopard, Leopard, Himalayan Black Bear, Leopard Cat, Himalayan Musk Deer, Himalayan Serow and the Bhutan Takin. The Tibetan Wolf is seen only in this park in Bhutan.

==== Birds ====
The survey in 2008 recorded a total of 250 bird species in the park.

==== Butterflies ====
42 species of butterflies have been recorded from within the National Park and from the nearby buffer zones.

== Tourist Attraction ==
=== Nomads Festival ===
This is a two days event organized by the National Park in collaboration with various stakeholders where the nomadic highlander from various parts of Bhutan gather to celebrate their unique culture and tradition

=== Bumthang Cultural Trek ===
This is an easy 3 days trek where numerous Buddhist temples are on the way and a pass called Phebila.

=== Drapham Dzong Ruins ===
Drapham Dzong in the upper Chokhor valley is an important archaeological site in Bhutan. It was built by Chokhor Deb in the second half of the 16th century.

=== Dhur Tshachu ===
The Dhur Tshachu or the Dhur hotspring is located on the popular Snow Man Trek II which takes 25 days. The trek starts from Paro in western Bhutan and ends in Dhur village in Bumthang.

This hotspring is visited by people for its therapeutic values. There are seven different hotsprings within the area. The hotspring lies on the bank of the upper Mangdechu. Though this hotspring is part of a major trekking route, it can be reached from two places without taking the 25 days snowman trek route. One route starts from Sephu in Wangdue Phodrang and another starts from Dhur Village in Bumthang.

== See also ==
- List of protected areas of Bhutan
