= Bumdeling Wildlife Sanctuary =

Wildlife sanctuary of Bhutan

Coordinates: 27°47′50″N 91°26′16″E

- Location within Bhutan
- Location: Lhuntse, Mongar, Trashiyangtse, Bhutan
- Area: 1,520.61 km^{2} (587.11 sq mi)
- Governing body: Department of Forests and Park Services of Bhutan
- Website: Bhutan Trust Fund for Environmental Conservation

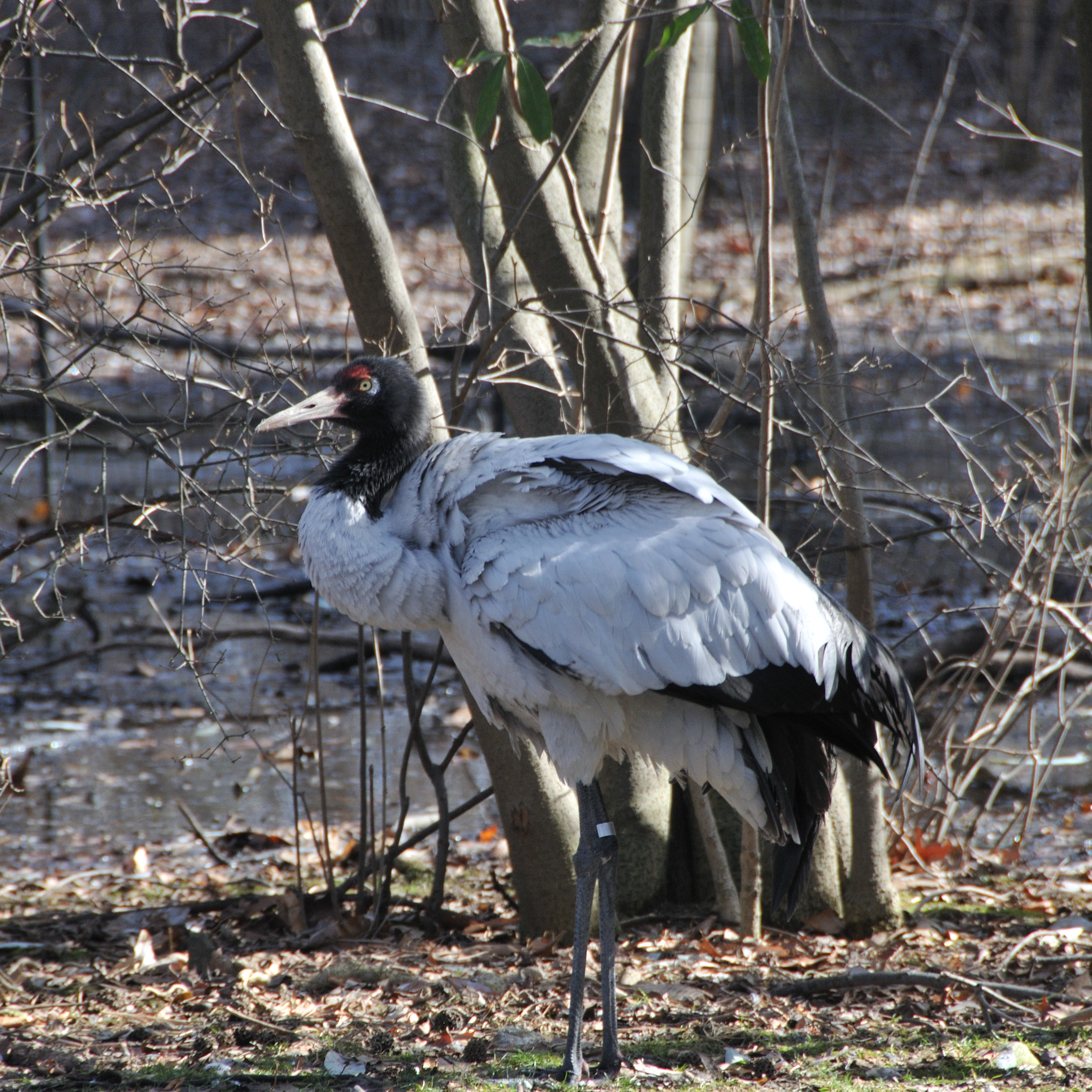
Black-necked crane

The Bumdeling Wildlife Sanctuary (also spelled Bumdelling or Bomdeling), which contains the former Kulong Chu Wildlife Sanctuary, covers 1,520.61 square kilometres (587.11 sq mi) in northeastern Bhutan at elevations between 1,500 metres (4,900 ft) and 6,000 metres (20,000 ft). The sanctuary covers most of Trashiyangtse District, including Bumdeling Gewog. The sanctuary was planned in 1995 and established in 1998. It contains diverse flora, fauna, and scenery including alpine lakes and the Bumdeling Valley. The sanctuary also contains several cultural and religious sites. In the park live 3,000 resident households. The sanctuary is located in the basin of one of the largest rivers of Buthan and Kholong Chu, Drangme Chu.

The sanctuary has been identified as an Important Bird Area by BirdLife International because it supports black-necked cranes (it is one of the country's two wintering sites), wood snipes and grey-crowned prinias. As of 2007, there was a record of the white-tailed eagle, a first for the sanctuary. It is listed in Bhutan's Tentative List for UNESCO inclusion.

Ludlow's Bhutan swallowtail, the only endemic butterfly in Bhutan and in the world, lives here.

== See also ==
- List of protected areas of Bhutan
- Black-necked cranes in Bhutan
