= List of protected areas of Bhutan =

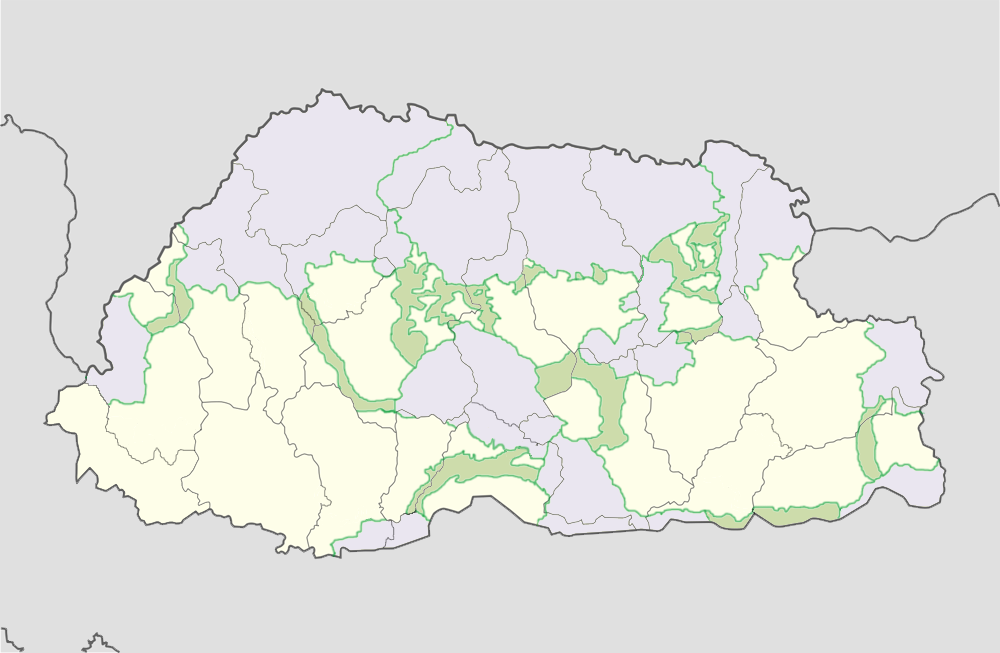

Protected areas of Bhutan in lavender, biological corridors in green.

The protected areas of Bhutan are its national parks, nature preserves, and wildlife sanctuaries. Most of these protected areas were first set aside in the 1960s, originally covering most of the northern and southern regions of Bhutan. Today, protected areas cover more than 42% of the kingdom, mostly in the northern regions. Protected areas also line most of Bhutan's international borders with China and India.

== Background ==
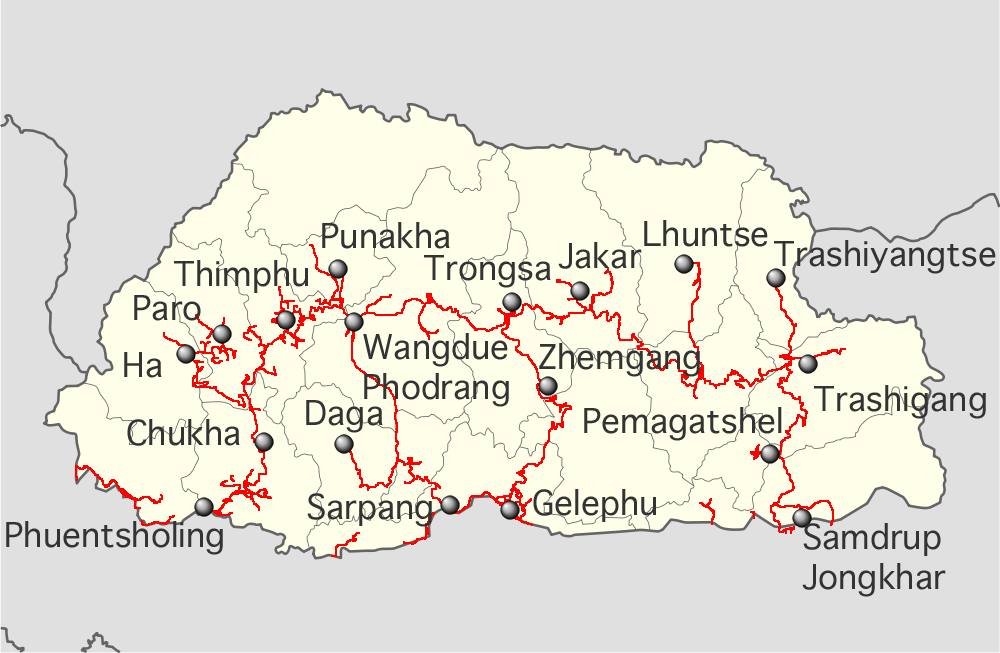
Highways of Bhutan, including the Lateral Road, straddle protected areas and cross biological corridors. The Gelephu-Zhemgang road serves as the border between Royal Manas and Jigme Singye Wangchuck National Parks.

The Forest and Nature Conservation Act of Bhutan, 1995 is the primary legislation that provides a framework of protected areas of Bhutan. The Act defines a protected area as an area, which has been declared to be a national park, conservation area, wildlife sanctuary, wildlife reserve, nature reserve, strict nature reserve, research forest, critical watershed or other protected areas. The government agency responsible for the oversight of protected areas is the Ministry of Agriculture, Forestry Services Division. Since 1992, protected areas have been managed by the Bhutan Trust Fund for Environmental Conservation. In 1993, the Fund revised and reduced its extensive parks system for better ecological representation and management. From 2008, however, protected areas expanded significantly with the establishment of Wangchuck Centennial National Park, spanning 4,914 square kilometres (1,897 sq mi) in northern Bhutan. The parks and sanctuaries are all connected either directly or by "biological corridors." As of 2011, the Fund had recruited 189 field staff, trained 24 post-graduate specialists, and provided over 300 short scientific courses. The Fund alone manages a total protected area of 16,396.43 square kilometres (6,330.70 sq mi) – nearly the size of Switzerland and more than 42% of Bhutan's total 38,394 square kilometres (14,824 sq mi). With the exception of Phibsoo Wildlife Sanctuary and Jigme Khesar Strict Nature Reserve, these protected areas are inhabited or are located within populated areas.

In practice, the overlap of these extensive protected lands with populated areas has led to mutual habitat encroachment. The Lateral Road, Bhutan's main highway, bisects Phrumsengla National Park at the centre of the kingdom. Protected wildlife has entered agricultural areas, trampling crops and killing livestock. In response, Bhutan has implemented an insurance scheme, begun constructing solar-powered alarm fences, watch towers, and search lights, and has provided fodder and salt licks outside human settlement areas to encourage animals to stay away.

=== Biological Corridors in Bhutan ===
The biological corridors were first established in 1999 and considered a gift to the Earth by the people of Bhutan. There were initially 12 corridors, with a total coverage of 3,660 square kilometres (1,413 sq mi) connecting all nine of Bhutan's protected areas. In 2008, the Wangchuck Centennial National Park was established, subsuming three corridors. The corridors are considered a national endeavor and an innovative, cost-effective, reliable solution for nature conservation by Bhutan. Bhutan relies on the corridors as a strategy to promote gene flow for all species, conserve wide-ranging species, and allow species to adapt to climate change.

== List of protected areas ==
Below is a list of the ten protected areas of Bhutan maintained by the Trust Fund:

- Bumdeling Wildlife Sanctuary (Lhuntse, Mongar, and Trashiyangtse Districts; contains the former Kulong Chu Wildlife Sanctuary)
- Jigme Dorji National Park (Gasa, Paro, Punakha, Thimphu, and Wangdue Phodrang Districts)
- Jigme Singye Wangchuck National Park (Sarpang, Tsirang, Trongsa, Wangdue Phodrang, and Zhemgang Districts)
- Jomotsangkha Wildlife Sanctuary (Samdrup Jongkhar District)
- Phibsoo Wildlife Sanctuary (Dagana and Sarpang Districts)
- Royal Manas National Park (Pemagatshel, Sarpang, and Zhemgang Districts)
- Sakteng Wildlife Sanctuary (Trashigang and Samdrup Jongkhar Districts)
- Phrumsengla National Park (Bumthang, Lhuntse, Mongar, and Zhemgang Districts)
- Jigme Khesar Strict Nature Reserve (Haa District)
- Wangchuck Centennial National Park (Bumthang, Gasa, Lhuntse, Trongsa, and Wangdue Phodrang Districts)

In addition, the Royal Government maintains the following protected areas:

- Motithang Takin Preserve (Thimphu District)

The following areas of Bhutan are protected or maintained by private organizations:

- Phobjikha Valley (Royal Society for Protection of Nature)

== See also ==
- Environmental issues in Bhutan
- Royal Society for the Protection of Nature (RSPN)
- List of Hot Springs and Mineral Springs of Bhutan
