= Betsamang =

Coordinates: 27.669°N 91.442°E

Betsamang (Dzongkha: བེ་རྩ་མང; Wylie: be rtsa mang)is a village in the north of Bhutan. It is located in Trashiyangtse District.
