= Torsa Strict Nature Reserve =

Nature reserve in Bhutan

Coordinates: 27°19′46″N 89°3′48″E

- Jigme Khesar Strict Nature Reserve
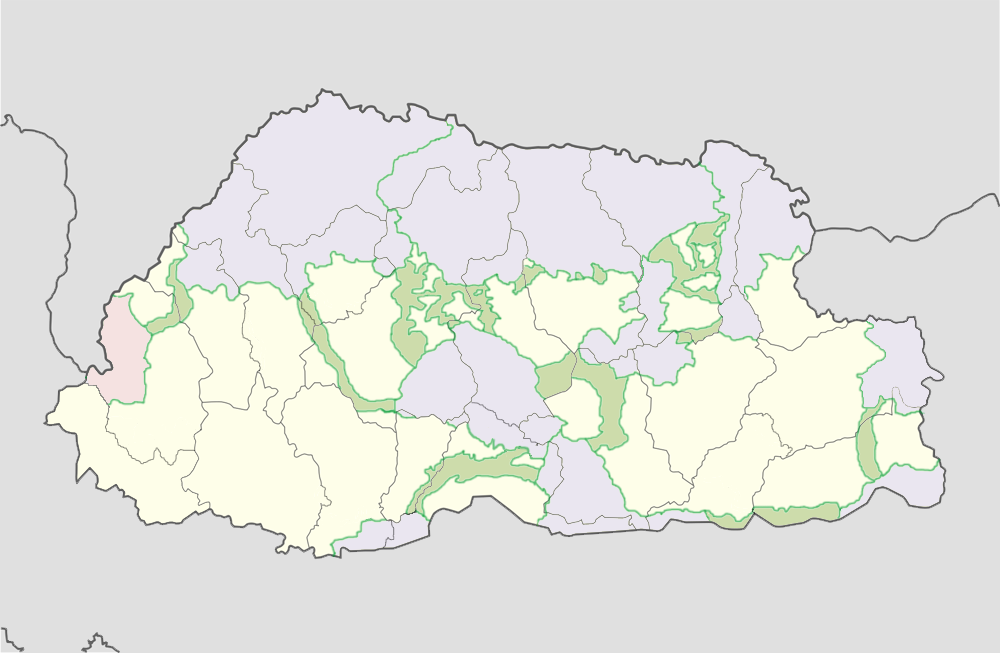
- Location: Haa, Bhutan
- Area: 609.51 km^{2} (235.33 sq mi)
- Website: Bhutan Trust Fund for Environmental Conservation

The Torsa Strict Nature Reserve (officially Jigme Khesar Strict Nature Reserve) (Note: Renamed in 2014 in honour of the Druk Gyalpo (King) Jigme Khesar Namgyel Wangchuck.) in Bhutan covers 609.51 square kilometres (Note: The original area, when established in 1993, was 644 square kilometres.) in Haa District, occupying most of its area. Founded along with other national parks in 1993 by decision of the royal government, it borders Sikkim and Tibet to the west and is connected to Jigme Dorji National Park via a "biological corridor." Torsa SNR contains the westernmost temperate forests of Bhutan, from broadleaf forests to alpine meadows and the small lakes of Sinchulungpa, at altitudes ranging from 1,400 metres (4,600 ft) to 4,800 metres (15,700 ft). Like Phibsoo Wildlife Sanctuary, Torsa SNR has no resident human population.

== Flora and fauna ==
This diverse ecosystem is home to various endangered species such as the Tibetan snowcock, red panda, snow leopard and rufous-necked hornbill. Also grows in the reserve the only endemic poppy, the white poppy.

== Rivers ==
The Amo Chu river that flows in from Tibet's Chumbi Valley is called Torsa Chu after it enters the Torsa SNR. It is the source of the lakes that exist in Torsa SNR.

== See also ==
- List of protected areas of Bhutan
