= Jomotsangkha Wildlife Sanctuary =

Wildlife Sanctuary of Bhutan

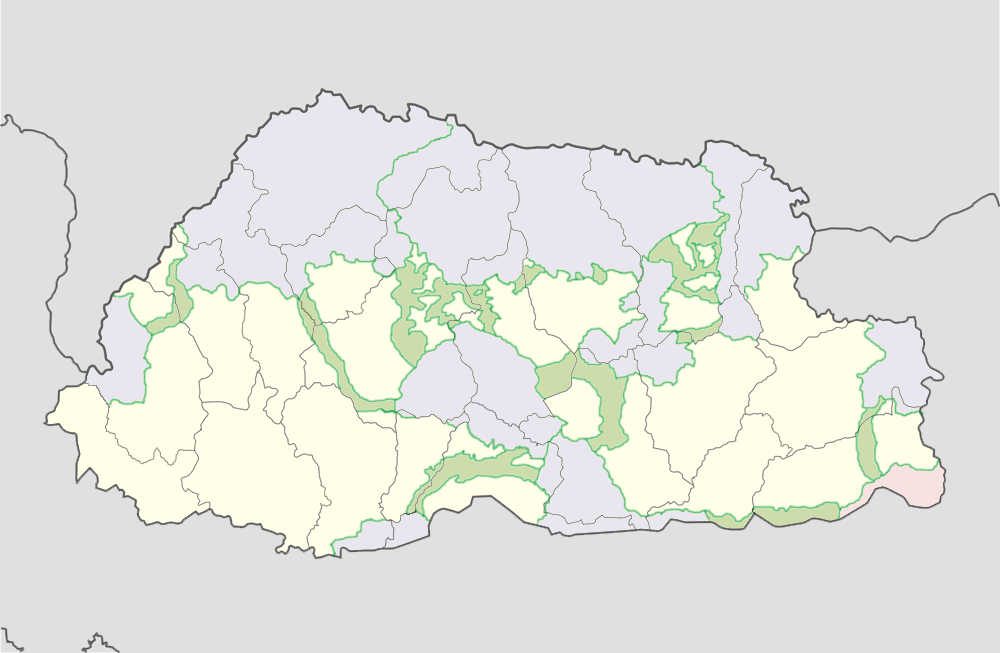
- Location: Samdrup Jongkhar, Bhutan
- Area: 334.73 km^{2} (129.24 sq mi)
- Website: Bhutan Trust Fund for Environmental Conservation

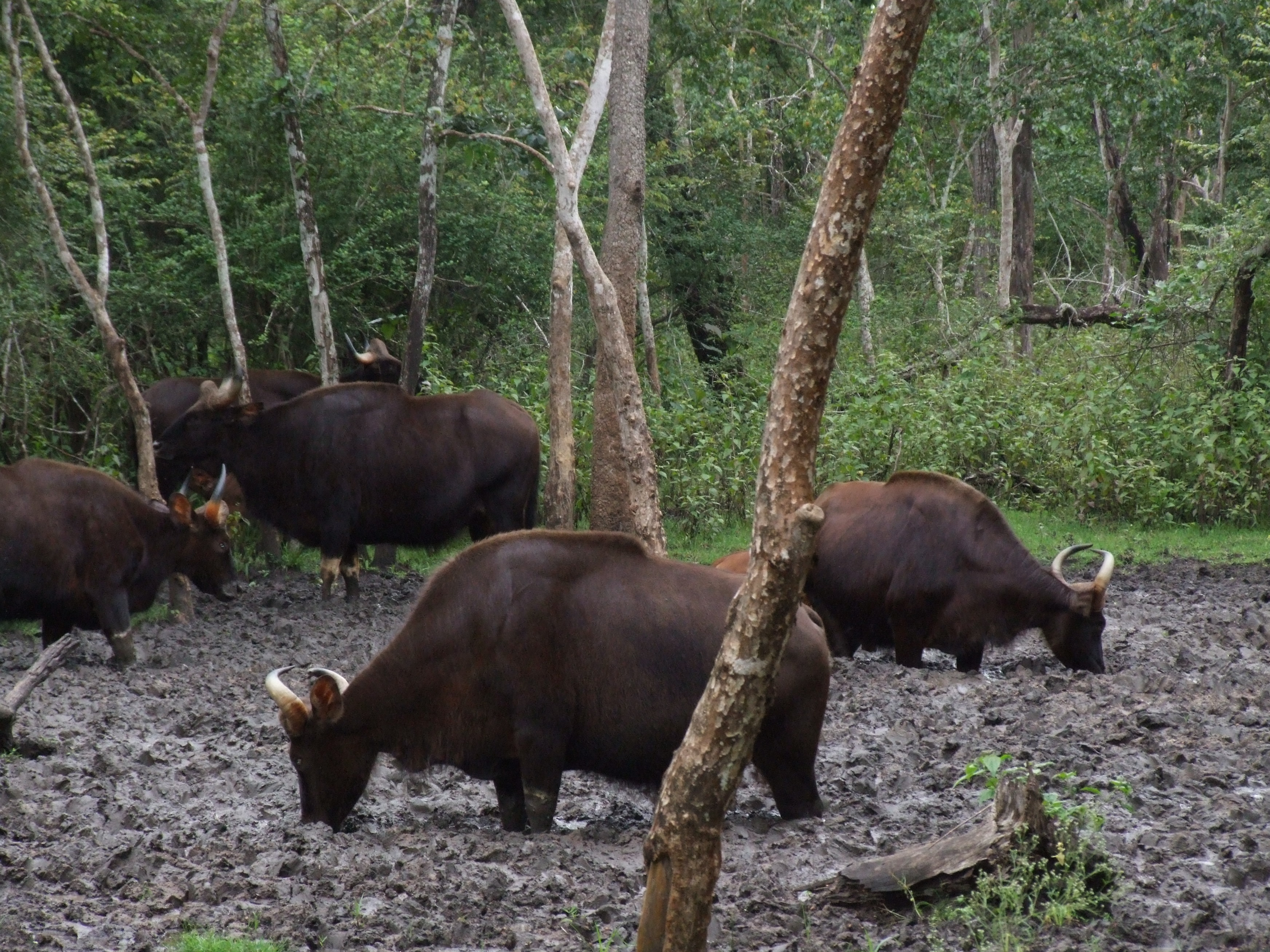
Wild gaur at a salt lick

Jomotsangkha Wildlife Sanctuary (formerly Khaling Wildlife Sanctuary) is the smallest protected area of Bhutan covering 334.73 square kilometres (129.24 sq mi) in Samdrup Jongkhar District along the southern border with Assam. Its elevations range between 400 metres (1,300 ft) and 2,200 metres (7,200 ft). Khaling Wildlife Sanctuary is, despite its small acreage, an important habitat for elephants, gaur (Bos gaurus), and other tropical wildlife. It may also contain the rare pygmy hog (Porcula salvania) and hispid hare (Caprolagus hispidus) known to inhabit the adjacent Khaling Reserve in Assam, with which Khaling Wildlife Sanctuary forms a trans-border reserve.

== See also ==
- List of protected areas of Bhutan
