= Phibsoo Wildlife Sanctuary =

Wildlife Sanctuary of Bhutan

Coordinates: 26°47′53″N 90°2′41″E

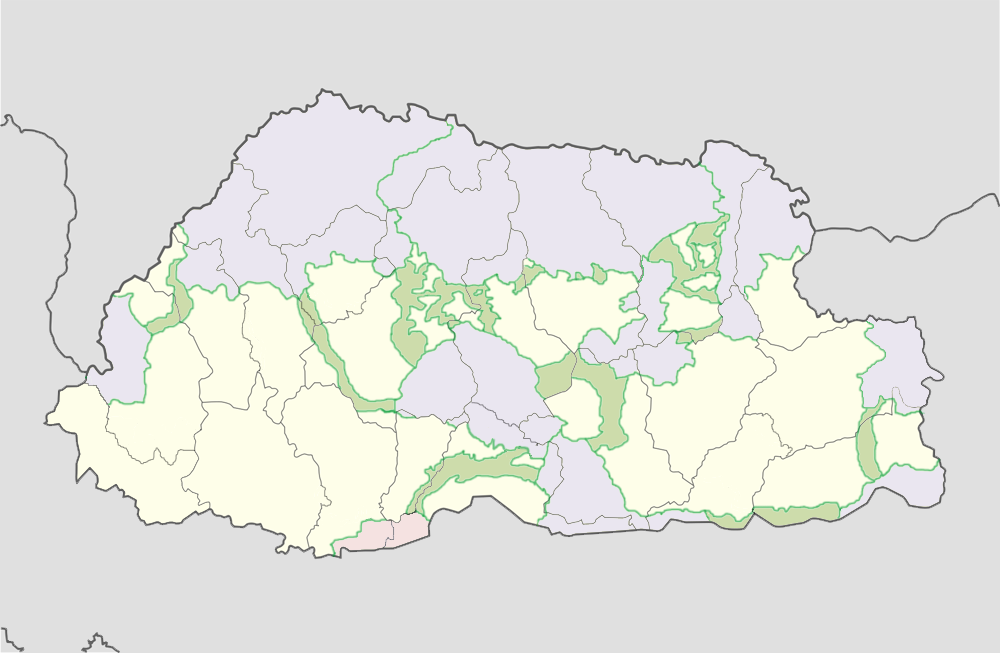
- Location: Dagana and Sarpang districts, Bhutan
- Area: 268.93 km^{2} (103.83 sq mi)
- Website: www.bhutantrustfund.bt

The Phibsoo Wildlife Sanctuary is the smallest of ten protected areas in Bhutan, covering 286.83 square kilometres (110.75 sq mi), 146.4 square kilometres (56.5 sq mi) in western Sarpang District and 140.43 square kilometres (54.22 sq mi) in southeastern Dagana District in the Himalayan foothills along the border with Assam and West Bengal in India.

== History ==
In 1974, Phibsoo Wildlife Sanctuary and five other protected areas were created as Phibsoo Reserved Forest. It was promoted to the status of wildlife sanctuary in 1993. Its first management plan was for five years starting in 2012, covering an area of 269 square kilometres (104 sq mi), being increased to 286.83 square kilometres (110.75 sq mi) in 2019.

The park is recovering from the 1990s, when the country had internal problems with the militia; as of 2011, park rangers still had to be wary. Poaching is also an issue.

As of 2022, 1037 people in 151 households lived within the sanctuary, primarily engaged in agriculture and livestock raising.

== Flora and fauna ==
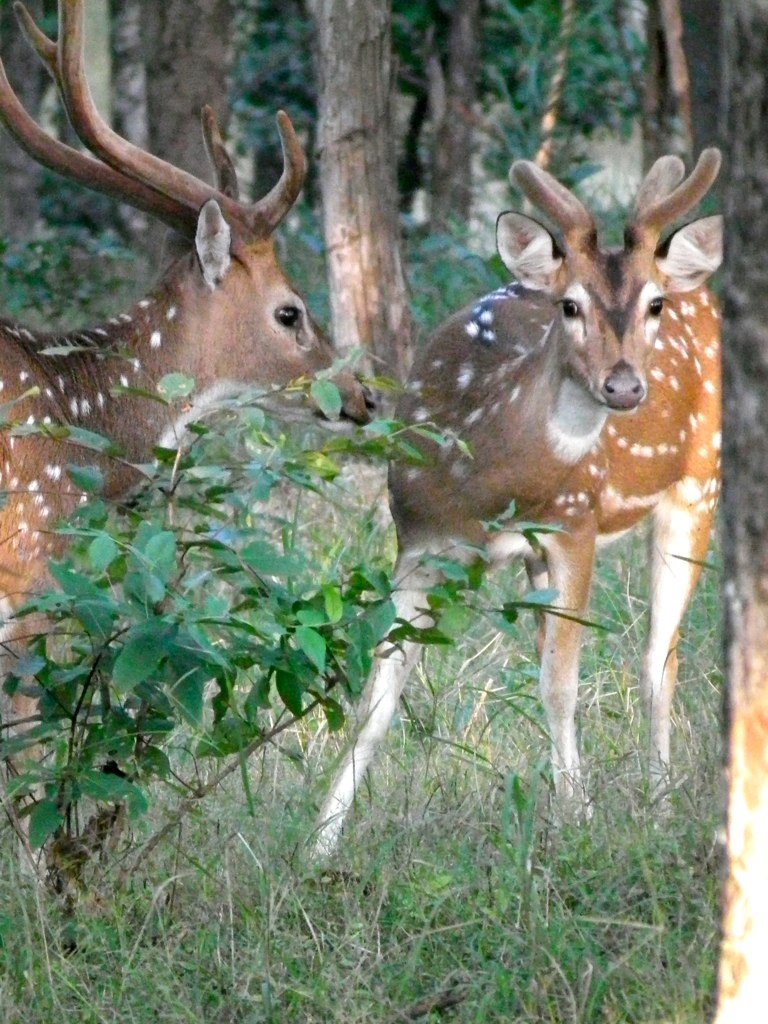
Chital stags

Biodiversity surveys have found 36 mammal, 418 bird, 23 fish, 177 butterfly and 60 herpeto-fauna species.

Phibsoo is unique in Bhutan for its chital ("spotted deer"). It is also home to the:

- agar tree
- Asian elephant
- Bengal tiger
- Chinese pangolin
- gaur
- clouded leopard
- leopard cat
- golden mahseer (fish)
- golden langur (monkey)
- sambar deer
- peafowl
- great hornbill
- rufous-necked hornbill
- white-bellied heron
- wreathed hornbill

Surveys have found 358 plant or 637 flowering plant species. It is noted for its natural sal (Shorea robusta) forests. There are three broad vegetation categories: sub-tropical semi-evergreen forest, sub-tropical moist deciduous forest and sub-tropical moist evergreen forest

== See also ==
- List of protected areas of Bhutan
