= Merag-Sagteng =

Merag-Sagteng (Dzongkha: མེ་རག་ སག་སྟེང་;Sakten Dungkhag;also called "Mera Sagteng," "Mera Sagten," "Merak Sagteng,""Mira Sagteng," and "Mira-Sakden") is a Dungkhag ( sub-district of a dzongkhag) of Trashigang District, Bhutan.Sakten Dungkhag is composed of Merag Gewog and Sakten Gewog.
