= Merak, Bhutan =

Settlement in Bhutan

Coordinates: 27.297°N 91.835°E

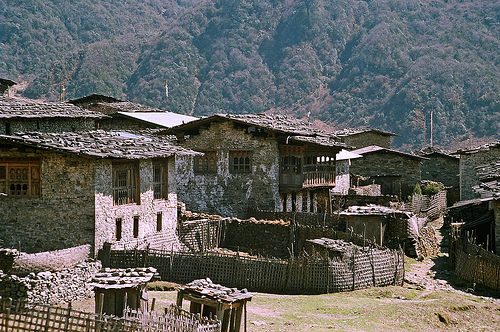

Merak (Dzongkha: མེ་རག་, romanized: me rag) is a settlement and the headquarters of an eponymous gewog in the far east of Bhutan. Merak is part of the Mera-Sakteng subdistrict (dungkhag) in the Trashigang District. The people are widely known as Brokpa, meaning 'highlander'. The main activities of these highlanders are raising of the domestic animals. Until 2012, Merak could only be reached by a two-day hike. In 2012 a new road was constructed that shortened the hike to one day. According to local legend, the surrounding valley is inhabited by Yeti.
