= Sakteng =

- Location in Bhutan
- Coordinates: 27°23′N 91°52′E
- Country: Bhutan
- District: Trashigang District
- Village block: Sakteng Gewog
- Time zone: UTC+6 (BTT)

Sakteng (Dzongkha: སག་སྟེང་, romanized: sag steng) is a town and the headquarters of an eponymous gewog in Trashigang District in far eastern Bhutan. The nearby Sakteng Wildlife Sanctuary is named after it.

== In popular culture ==
Sakteng was featured in an Imogen Heap song and video Climb to Sakteng officially published in 2014 as part of the album Sparks. It documents the families of the village carrying power poles up the mountain as part of the successful 2012 effort to electrify their village.
