= Oesel Choeling Monastery =

Buddhist monastery in Bhutan

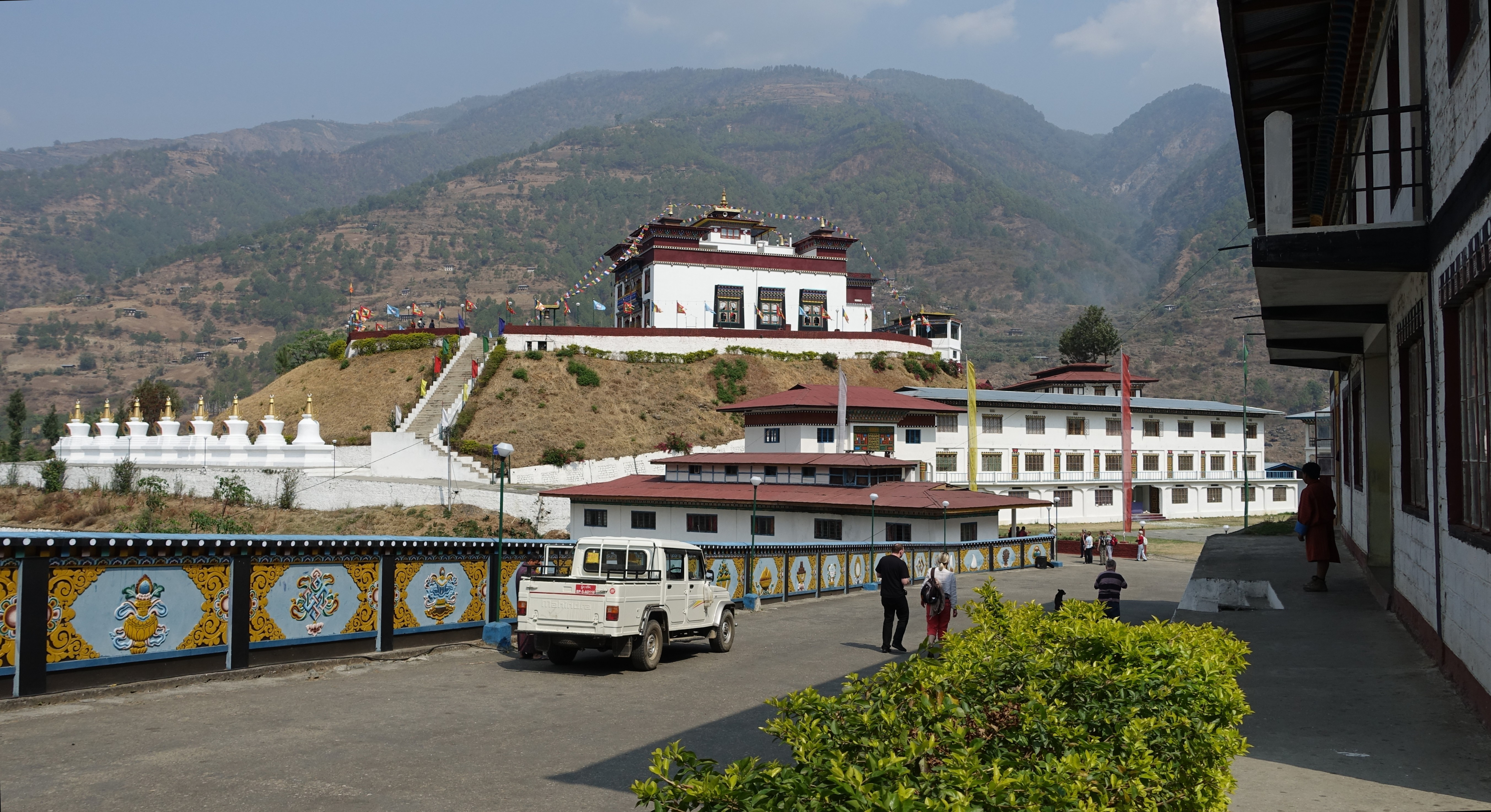

- Location within Bhutan

Religion
- Affiliation: Tibetan Buddhism

Location
- Location: Ranjung, Trashigang District, Bhutan
- Country: Bhutan
- Interactive map of Oesel Choeling Monastery
- Coordinates: 27.3622°N 91.6706°E

Architecture
- Founder: Garab Rinpoche
- Established: 1990

Oesel Choeling Monastery is a Buddhist monastery in Bhutan. It is located in the village of Rangjung, on the left bank of the Gamri Chhu, approximately 16 kilometres from Trashigang. The monastery was built in 1990 by Garab Rinpoche. Austrian influence in the area has also funded a hydroelectric plant.
