= Khaling =

Khaling may refer to:

- Khaling language, in Nepal and India
- Khaling people, a Kiranti ethnic group of Nepal
- Khaling, Bhutan, a town
  - Khaling Gewog, the administrative unit
  - Khaling Wildlife Sanctuary

== See also ==
- Dibya Khaling, Nepali musician
