= Trashigang Dzong =

Fortress in Trashigang, Bhutan

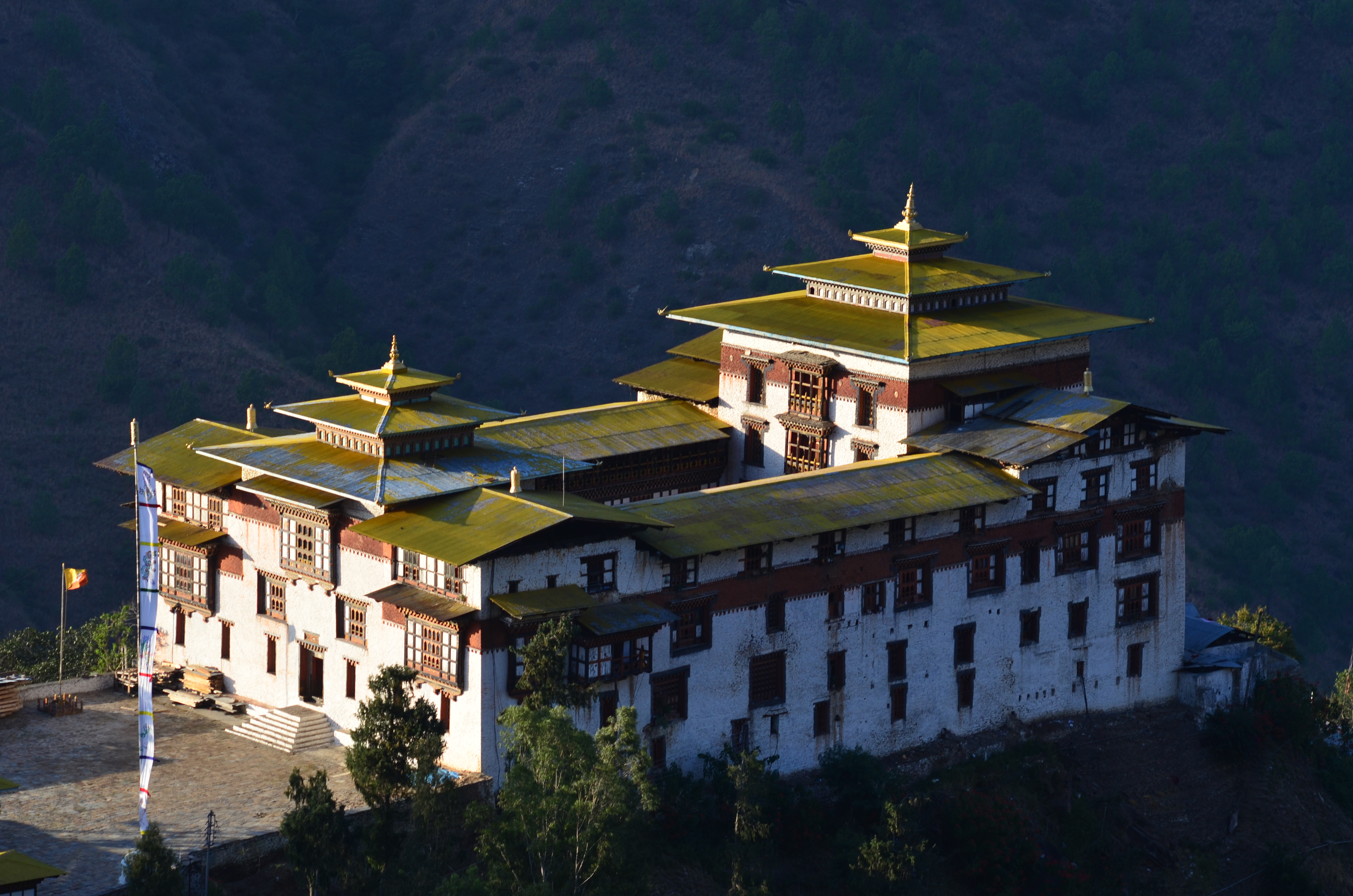
- Trashigang Dzong

- Location within Bhutan

Religion
- Affiliation: Tibetan Buddhism
- Festival: Trashigang Tshechu

Location
- Location: Trashigang, Trashigang District, Bhutan
- Country: Bhutan
- Coordinates: 27°20′12.6″N 91°33′05.2″E

Architecture
- Style: Dzong
- Established: 1659; 367 years ago

Trashigang Dzong (Dzongkha: བཀྲ་ཤིས་སྒང་རྫོང, literally "The Fortress of the Auspicious Hill") is one of the largest dzong fortresses in Bhutan, located in Trashigang in Trashigang District of Bhutan. The fortress was built in 1659 to defend against Tibetan invasions. The dzong hosted a monastic community besides acting as the central administrative center of the Trashigang District, before they were shifted due to the ongoing restoration.

== History ==
The fortress was built in 1659 atop a ledge with steep cliffs on three sides, overlooking the Drangme Chhu and Gamri Chhu rivers. The construction of the dzong was prophesied by Ngawang Namgyal who ordered the Penlop (Governor) of Trongsa, Chhogyal Minjur Tempa to put down local chieftains and construct the dzong. According to legend, the sight of the Dzong scared the Tibetan army which retreated while remarking that the Dzong was a "Sky Dzong and was not on the ground". The dzong was further expanded by Gyalsey Tenzin Rabgye between 1680 and 1694 and by Dzongpon Dopola in 1936. The dzong was consecrated and named as Trashigang by Dudjom Jigdral Yeshe Dorje. After the 1962 Sino-Indian War, Bhutan allowed Indian soldiers returning home to pass through Eastern Bhutan. However they were required to deposit their rifles at the armoury in the Dzong, and proceed through Bhutan unarmed. The rifles lie in the Dzong to this day. The dzong celebrates the four day long Trashigang Tshechu festival every year, with around 1500 people attending the celebrations on each day.

== Conservation ==
The dzong developed wide cracks as a result of the 2009 Bhutan earthquake, whose epicenter was 10 miles (16 km) away from the dzong. A partnership between World Monuments Fund, Prince Claus Fund and the Bhutan Foundation was instrumental for assistance in emergency repairs at the dzong. In February 2014, the Government of India allotted Nu.190 million for renovating the dzong. The renovation works are expected to be completed by June 2018, while the costs have risen to Nu.227.5 million. A drasha (monk hostel) for 50 monks, besides a tshokhang (dining area) are built outside the dzong's premises for safety and health reasons. The government is also recruiting local unemployed youth to construct the dzong, and will be using locally sourced materials in the construction, including timber mostly from Bumthang and stones from Chazam. The Trashigang district administrative offices have been temporarily relocated to the Trashigang Middle Secondary School while the clergy were moved to a school in Samkhar Gewog, about 10 km away from the dzong.

== Gallery ==
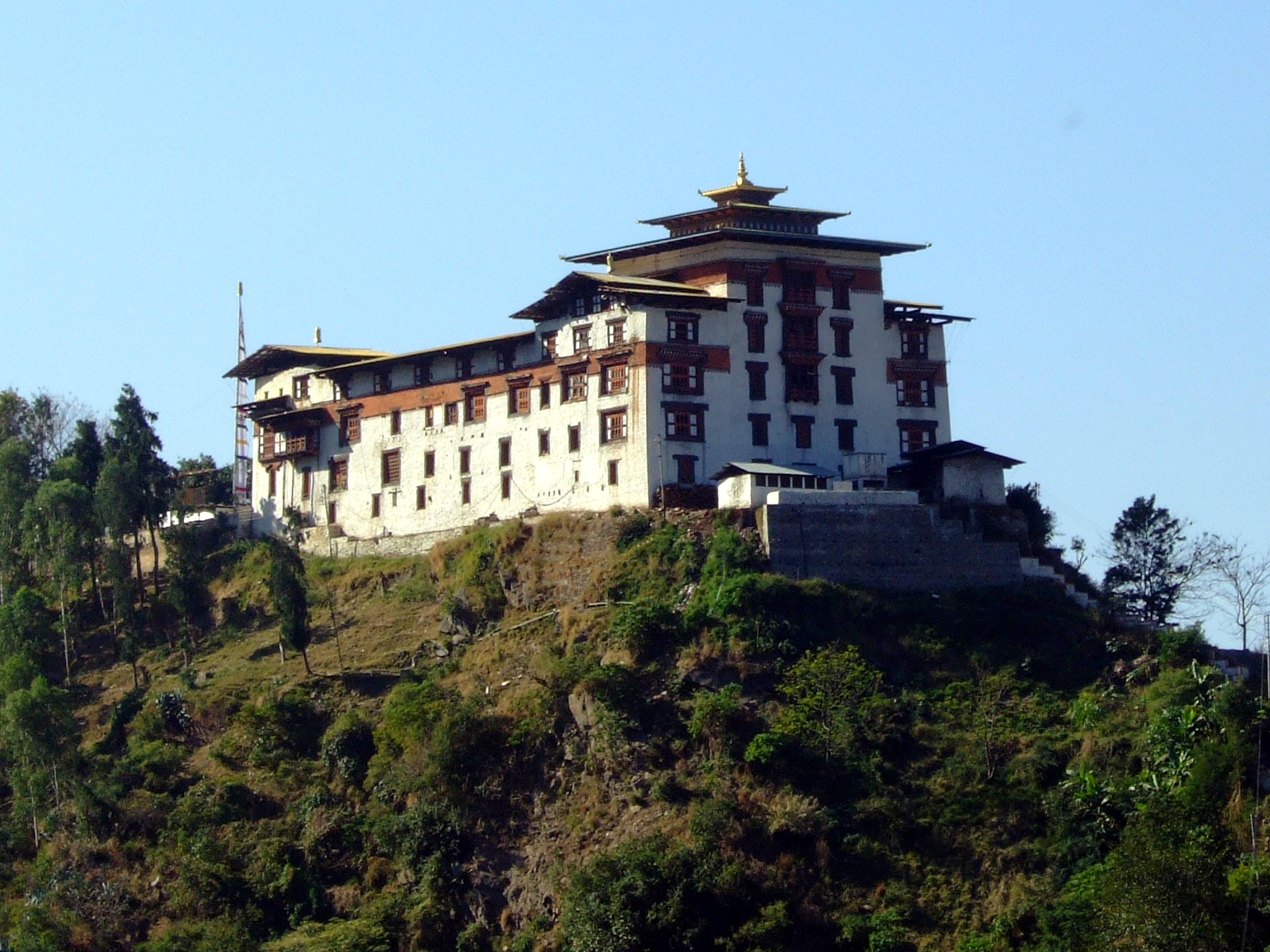

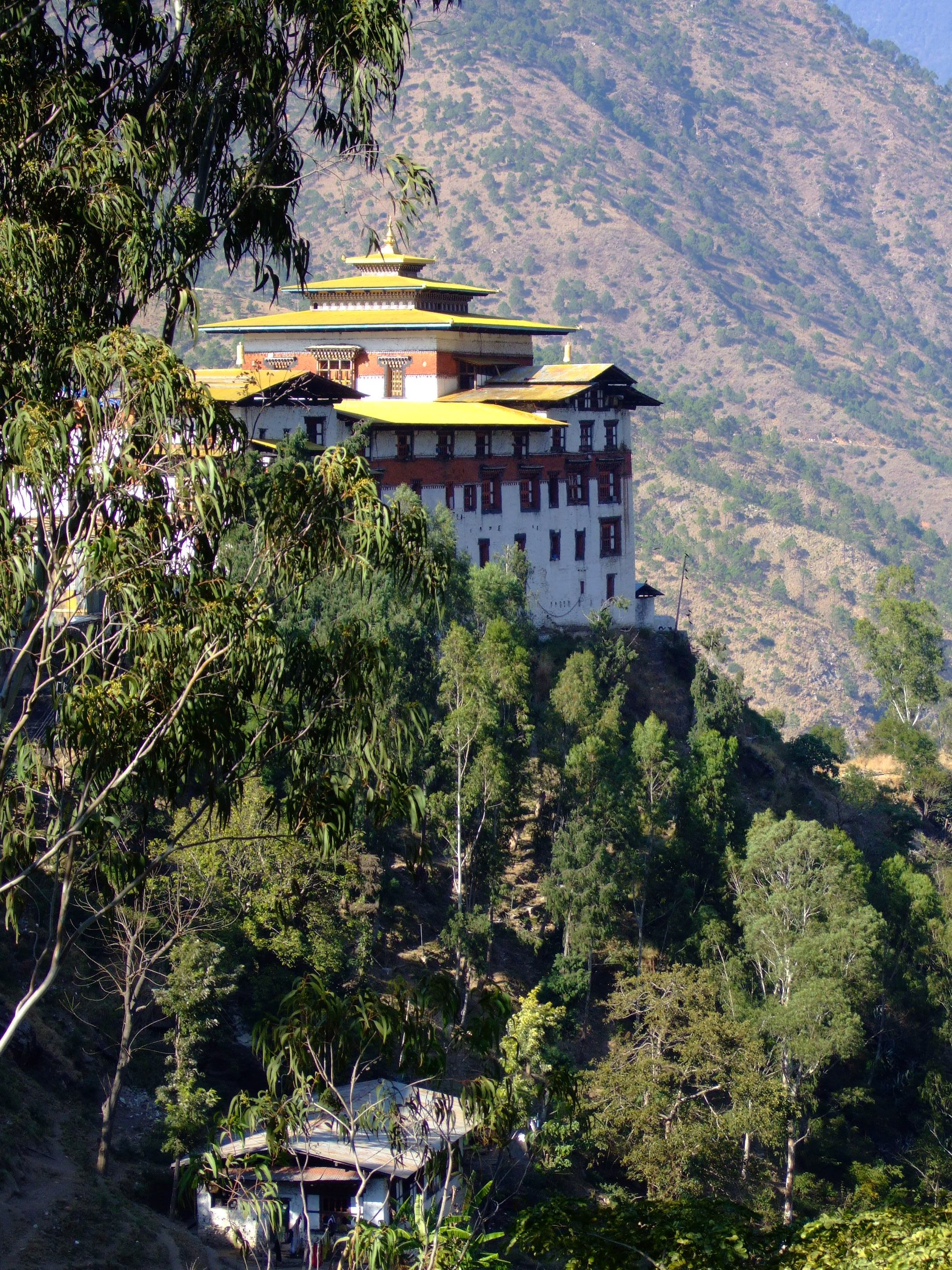

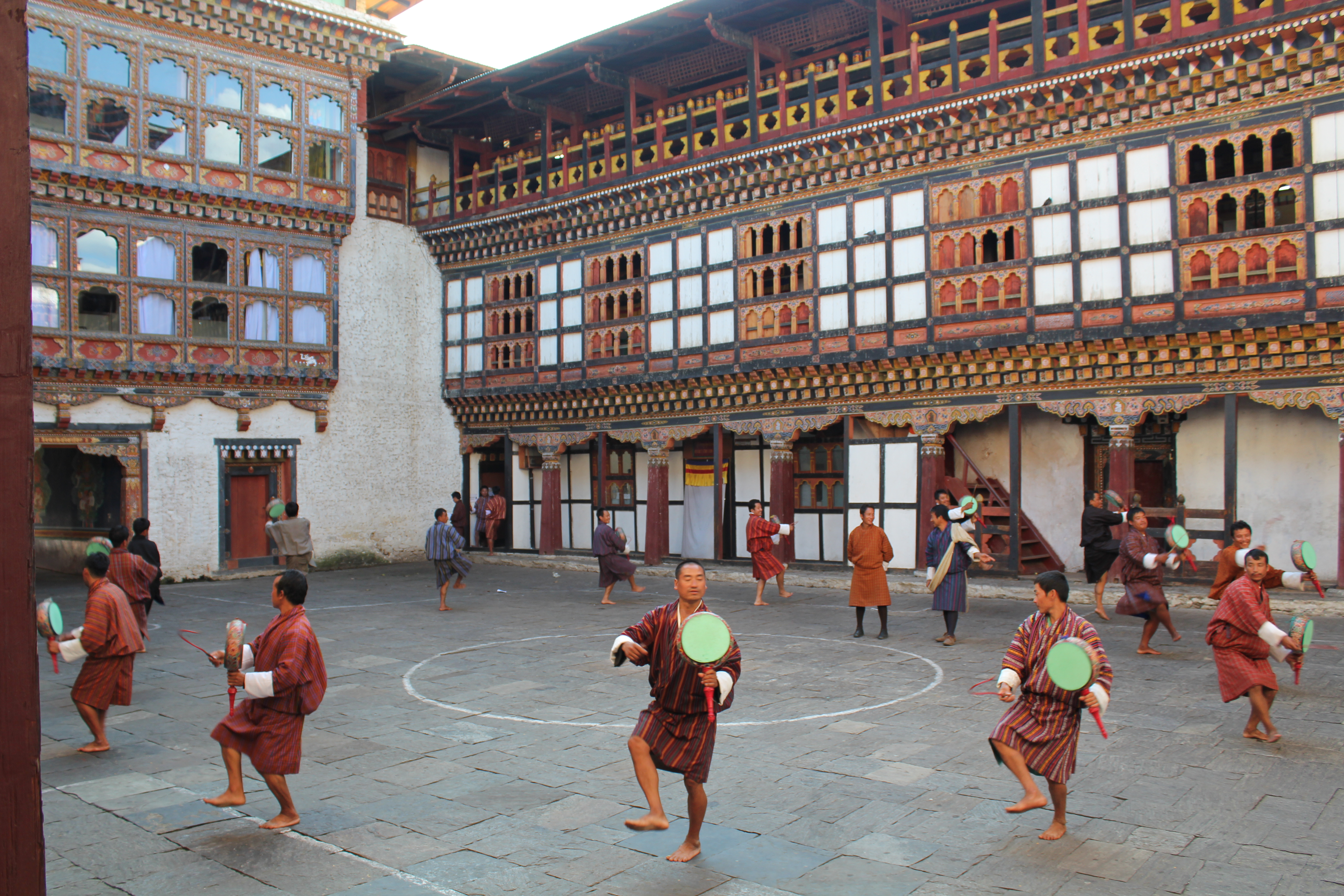
