= Ngaloong Gang =

- Location in Bhutan
- Coordinates: 27°22′N 91°35′E
- Country: Bhutan
- District: Trashigang District
- Village block: Bartsham Gewog
- Time zone: UTC+6 (BTT)

Ngaloong Gang, also spelled Ngalung Gang, is a village in Trashigang District in eastern Bhutan.
