= Brokpa language =

Tibetic language spoken in Bhutan

Brokpa
- Brokpa kay
- Region: Bhutan
- Native speakers: 5,000 (2006)
- Language family: Sino-Tibetan: Tibeto-Kanauri ?; Bodish; Tibetic; Dzongkha–Lhokä; Brokpa
- Writing system: Tibetan script

Language codes
- ISO 639-3: sgt
- Glottolog: brok1248
- ELP: Brokpake

Brokpa (Brokpake: Brokpakæ; Dzongkha: དྲོག་པ་ཁ།, དྲོགཔ་ཁ།) is a Tibetic language spoken by around 5,000 people. It is spoken by descendants of pastoral yakherd communities.

== Name ==
The Tibetan word འབྲོག་པ་ `brog pa refers to a multitude of nomadic or partially nomadic pastoral yak herd communities of the Himalaya region.

Due to their distribution Brokpa of Merak and Sakteng are sometimes also referred to as mera-sakteng-pa (‘people of Merak and Sakteng’) and their language as mera-sakteng-kha (‘language of Merak and Sakteng’).

== Classification ==
Brokpa is generally considered to be part of the Tibetic sub-cluster of the Sino-Tibetan language family. The internal classification within Tibetic has hitherto not been conclusively determined, which makes the exact position of Brokpa unclear.

Based on the classification by Shafer (1955), Brokpa would be considered as part of the Central Bodish branch, together with, among others, Dzongkha, Chocangacakha and Classical Tibetan.

Tournadre (2014) classifies it as part of the Southern Section of Tibetic. However, it has been noted that Brokpa does not share some phonological innovations made by Dzongkha and can therefore not be grouped together with Dzongkha at the lowest order of the family tree.

== Usage ==
The language is mainly spoken in the Bhutanese Gewogs of Merak and Sakteng in the Trashigang District of Eastern Bhutan and in the Indian districts of Tawang and West Kameng in Arunachal Pradesh.

Dondrup (1993: 3) lists the following Brokpa villages.

- West Kameng district
  - Lubrung
  - Dirme
  - Sumrang
  - Nyokmadung
  - Undra
  - Sengedrong
- Tawang district
  - Lagam
  - Mago
  - Thingbu
  - Lakuthang
- Bhutan
  - Sakteng
  - Merak

The 1981 census counted 1,855 Brokpa people in Arunachal Pradesh.

== Phonology ==
Brokpa is usually described as a more conservative or archaic language, although it has also made some innovations.

=== Consonants ===
The following table shows the inventory of Brokpa consonants as described in Wangdi (2021: 101–125)

Brokpa consonants
	Labial	Alveolar	Retroflex	Palatal	Velar	Glottal
Plosive	p pʰ b bʱ	t tʰ d dʱ	ʈ ʈʰ ɖ ɖʱ		k kʰ g gʱ	ʔ
Affricate		t͡s t͡sʰ d͡z		t͡ɕ t͡ɕʰ d͡ʑ		
Fricative		s z		ɕ ʑ		h ɦ
Nasal	m	n		ɲ	ŋ	
Trill		r̥ r				
Approximant	w	l̥ l		j		

1. /pʰ/ is realised as [ɸ] word-finally
2. /g/ is realised as [k] word-finally
3. /kʰ/ is realised as [x] word-finally
4. /g/ is realised as [ɣ] intervocally
5. /b/ is realised as [β] intervocally
6. /dz/ is in free variation with /z/
7. /z/ is in free variation with /s/
8. /ɦ/ and /w/ are sometimes interchangeable, such as in ɦukpa ~ wukpa ‘owl’, but not always, such as in ɦom(a) ‘milk’, which is never *woma

Additionally, some speakers do not consistently make the distinction between voiced and breathy voiced stops.

Other scholars do not consider the breathy-voiced stops to be distinctive phonemes since they correlate with low register tone. On the other hand, they consider palatal stops /c, cʰ, ɟ/ to be phonemic rather than palatalization of a velar consonant followed by the glide /j/ as Wangdi (2021) does. Additionally, /r̥/ has also been analysed as /ʂ/ with free alternation [ʂ ~ r̥], based on historical evidence.

=== Vowels ===
The vowel phonemes of Brokpa, according to Wangdi (2021), are as follows:

Brokpa vowels
	Front	Central	Back
Close	i yː		u
Close-Mid	e øː		
Open-Mid	æ ɛː	ɐ	
Open		a	

All vowels contrast in vowel-length in open syllables except for /ü, ö, æ/ which are always realised as long. Length does not contrast in closed syllables, as long vowels may be realised as short before a syllable-final consonant.

Nasalisation occurs phonemically due to assimilation to adjacent nasal consonants but is not considered phonetically distinctive.

Brokpa has eight of diphthongs in monomorphemic roots, usually in open syllables: /iu, ui, au, ai, ou, oi, eu, ea/.

=== Tone ===
Brokpa has two contrasting register tones, high and low. Some scholars mention the possible existence of a third tone, a falling contour tone.

Phonemic tone in Brokpa seems to have emerged due to the loss of voicing contrast in syllable-initial obstruents. Initial obstruents always correlate with certain pitch: Voiced obstruents and breathy-voiced stops are followed by low tone on the vowel, voiceless obstruents are followed by high tone. Tone is only contrasting in sonorant-initial syllables.

=== Phonotactics ===
There are five possible syllable types in Brokpa according to Wangdi (2021: 148–149):

1. C1 V
2. C1 C2 V
3. C1 V C3
4. C1 C2 V C3
5. C1 V C3 C4

The most frequent syllable structures are (i) and (iii). All consonants are allowed in the initial C1 position. C2 only may be filled by /r, l, w, j/. C3 may be filled by unaspirated voiceless and aspirated voiceless stops, nasals, the fricatives /s, z/, the liquids /l, r/, and the glottal stop. The slot C4 is restricted to /s/ and /ɕ/. There is a tendency to reduce syllable final C3+C4 clusters, especially among younger speakers. Not all possible combinations of C1 and C2 are allowed at the beginning of a syllable. The possible combinations are the following: /pr/, /pl/, /pʰr/, /br/, /bl/, /kr/, /ky/, /kʰy/, /gl/, /gy/.

== Nouns ==
=== Personal pronouns ===
Brokpa personal numbers distinguish between first, second and third person in singular and plural. The third person singular pronouns distinguish between masculine and feminine gender. The Brokpa pronouns according to Wangdi (2021: 328–332) are as follows:

Brokpa pronouns
	singular	plural
1st person	ŋa	ŋi
2nd person	kʰyo	kʰyi
3rd person masculine	kʰo	kʰoŋ
3rd person feminine	mo	kʰoŋ

Some scholars also note a distinction between first person plural inclusive ɲeraŋ and first person plural exclusive ɲí (corresponding to ŋi in the table above).

=== Case ===
Brokpa marks case with clitics, which are either applied to the head of the noun phrase or its last element. The case markers of Brokpa are the following according to Wangdi (2021: 469–475):

Brokpa cases
Morpheme	Case
=∅	Absolutive
=ge ~ =gi	Ergative
=ge ~ =gi	Instrumental
-gi	Genitive
=la, =na, =su	Locative
=la ~ =lu	Dative
=læ, =næ	Ablative
=la, =te	Allative
=daŋ	Associate/Comitative

Note that Wangdi (2021) does not consider the genitive -gi a case marker. Other scholars consider the ergative and the instrumental to be a single case marker.

The ergative/instrumental free variation for =ge ~ =gi and three additional allomorphs: =ge following a sonorant consonant; =ke ~ =kʰe following an obstruent; =e following a vowel. However, these allomorphic variations are not consistently maintained – the noted environments are but tendencies.

The absolutive case marks intransitive subjects and transitive objects. The ergative case marks transitive subjects. The locative marks spatial and/or temporal peripheral arguments. The ablative also marks such arguments if movement away from the referent is present. It may also mark peripheral arguments unrelated to spatial and temporal location. The instrumental case marks arguments in instrumental function. The dative marks benefactive, recipient and purpose, as well as indirect objects. The allative indicates temporal or spatial movement the referent of a noun phrase. The comitative/associative is used for comitative case marking as well as coordination within a noun phrase, clause coordination and clause-linking.

=== Grammatical number ===
Number marking is realised by enclitics and quantifying words, such as maŋbo ‘many’, or number words. However, number marking is not strictly necessary, if it is clear from context.

Phonologically bound plural markers of Brokpa are:

- =baʔ
- =tsʰu ~ =zu ~ =su
- =tsʰan ~ =san

The plural markers =baʔ and =tsʰu only differ insofar that =tsʰu may follow the definitive marker and is usually only attested following the definitive, while =baʔ always precedes the definitive marker.

The morpheme =tsʰan on the other hand is used to denote ‘X and associates’ (associative plural).

=== Number words ===
The Brokpa numbers from one to ten are:

Brokpa number words
Numeral	Cardinal number word
1	tɕʰik, gaŋ
2	ɲi, dʱó
3	sum
4	ʑi
5	ŋá
6	ɖuk
7	dün
8	gyæ
9	gu
10	tɕu(tʰam(ba))

Note that in the word for 10 both elements tʰam and ba are optinal.

Ordinal numbers are formed by suffixing -pa to the cardinal form, with exception to 1, which is daŋba ‘first’. Frequentative numerals are formed with the bond base kʰuɕ ‘times’, such as kʰuɕsum ‘three times’. Distributives are formed by adding -re to the reduplicated cardinal number.

Numerals from 10 to 19 are formed by adding the cardinal numbers of the ones to the cardinal tɕu ‘10’, as shown in the following table. Note that in some cases, a preradical from an earlier stage of the language has been retained, which can be seen in the Written Tibetan form.

Brokpa teens
Numeral	Cardinal number word	Written Tibetan
11	tɕuktɕʰi	Tibetan: གཅིག་, Wylie: gcig ‘1’
12	tɕuŋɲí	Tibetan: གནིས་, Wylie: gnyis ‘2’
13	tɕuksum	Tibetan: གསུམ་, Wylie: gsum ‘3’
14	tɕuiʑi	Tibetan: བཞི་, Wylie: bzhi ‘4’
15	tɕeŋa	Tibetan: ལྔ་, Wylie: lnga ‘5’
16	tɕuiɖuk	Tibetan: དྲུག་, Wylie: drug ‘6’
17	tɕupdün	Tibetan: བདུན་, Wylie: bdun ‘7’
18	tɕapgyæ	Tibetan: བརྒྱད, Wylie: brgyad ‘8’
19	tɕurgu	Tibetan: བརྒྱད་, Wylie: dgu ‘9’

Higher numerals can be formed in a decimal or in a vigesimal system with the base word kʰaː ‘score, twenty’.

=== Natural gender ===
Brokpa does not class nouns by grammatical gender but may mark biological gender of animates. Masculine gender is marked with -pʰo ~ -po ~ -bo and female gender with -mo ~ -mu ~ -ma. These morphemes are suffixed to the root of the respective noun such as ɕa ‘deer’, ɕa-pʰo ‘male deer, hart’, ɕa-mo ‘female deer, doe’. The morphemes pʰo and mo may occur in isolation when functioning as an adjective meaning ‘male’ and ‘female’ respectively.

Some inanimate nouns may take gender marking in some contexts, usually poetic expressions or songs.

=== Definiteness ===
Definite noun phrases are marked with =di in Brokpa. Indefiniteness is marked with =tɕiʔ ~ =ʑiʔ ~ =ɕiʔ, where =ɕiʔ follows an open syllable and =tɕiʔ ~ =ʑiʔ follow closed syllables.

=== Augmentative & diminutive ===
An augmentative of a noun can be formed by suffixing the morpheme -tɕʰen, which historically derives from tɕʰenpo ‘big’. It may indicate bigger size, more power and similar meanings.

Diminutives are formed by suffixing -pʰruʔ ~ -ʈuʔ ~ -ruʔ to a noun. Historically, the form may come from the word pʰrugu ‘baby’. It is mostly used to indicate an animal of young age or for endearment.

== See also ==
- Languages of Bhutan
