= Khamsum Yulley Namgyal Choeten =

Stupa in Bhutan

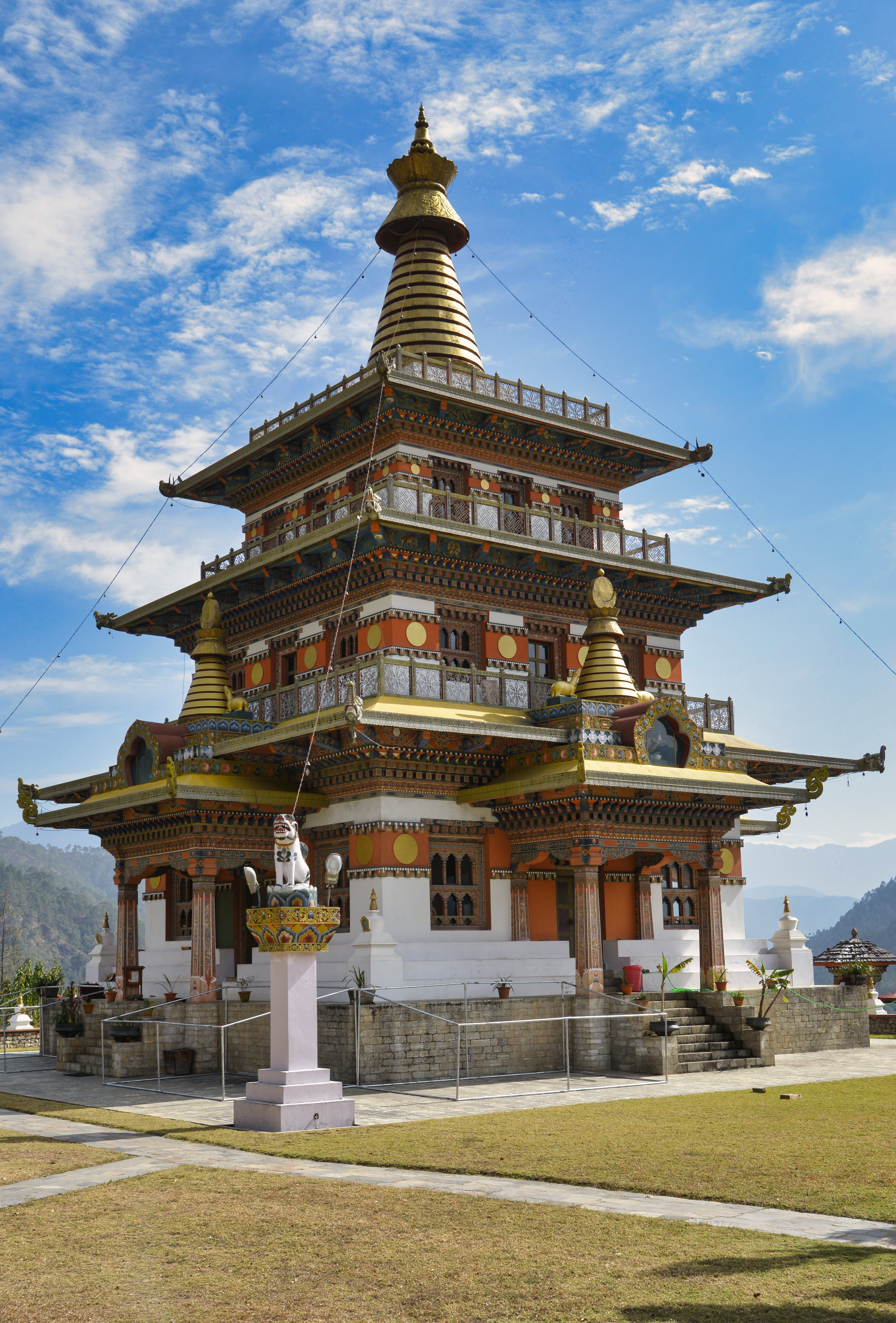
Kamsum Yulley Namgyal Chörten

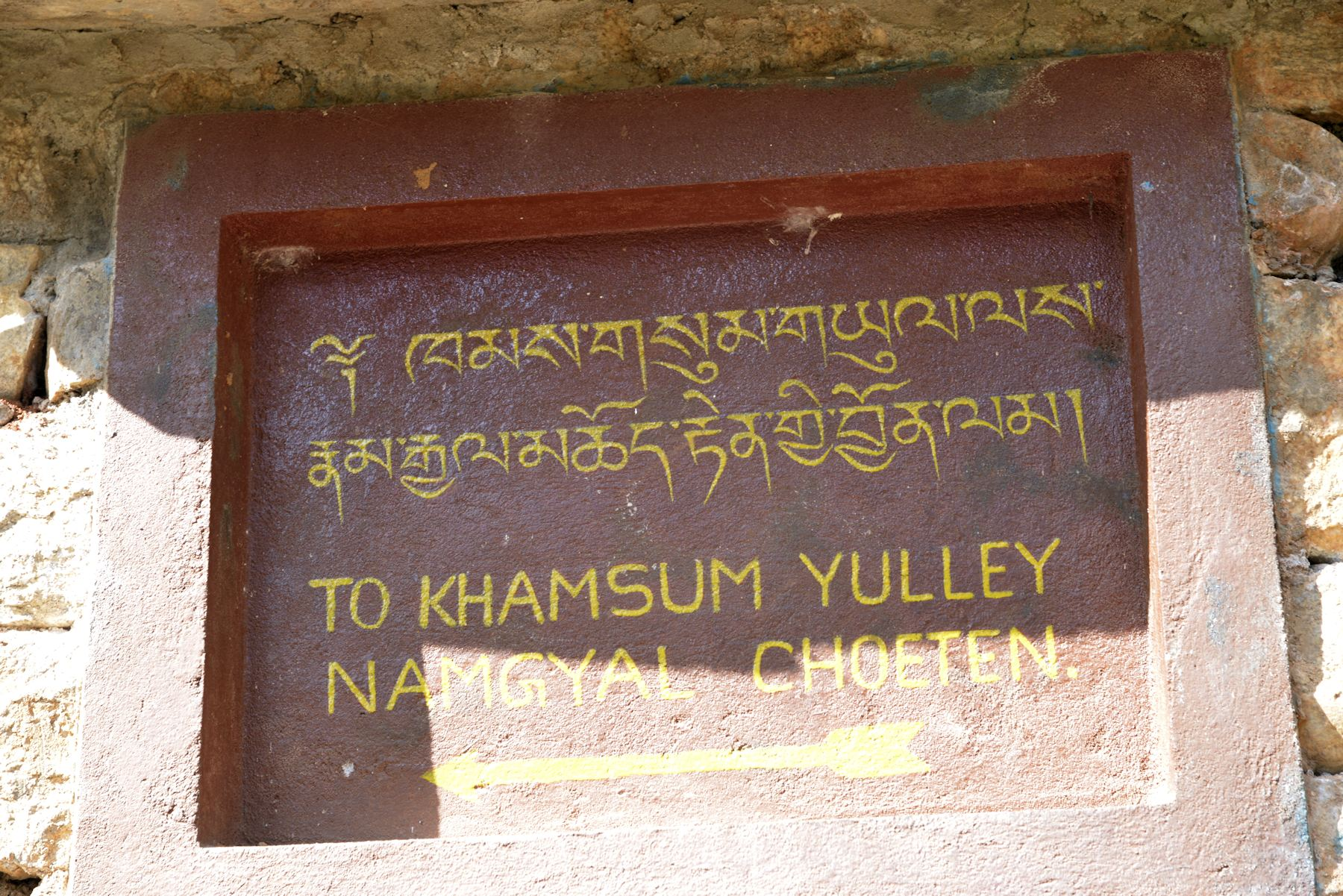
Sign way to Khamsum Yulley Namgyal Choeten.

Khamsum Yulley Namgyal Chörten (Dzongkha: ཁམས་གསུམ་གཡུལ་ལས་རྣམ་རྒྱལ་མཆོད་རྟེན, also known as Nyizergang Chörten and Punakha Zangdopelri) — chörten in the Punakha District, Bhutan.

- This chörten (stupa) was built in 2004 by HM The Queen Mother, Ashi Tshering Yangdon Wangchuck, in Nyizergang — about a thirty-minute walk uphill from the footbridge in Yepaisa Village.
- It was built in accordance with the instructions of Lopon Sonam Zangpo, with the intention of bringing peace in the world in general, and to clear obstacles for the country of Bhutan in particular.
- Its exterior is in the form of a pagoda like stupa while the interior consists of four stories containing images of the deities of mandalas of Vajarakilaya.
- Bartsham Lama Kunzang Wangdi, popularly known as Lama Nyingkula, a close disciple of Dudjom Rinpoche was in charge of the construction of this chörten.
