= Radi Gewog =

Radi Gewog ར་དི་
- Gewog
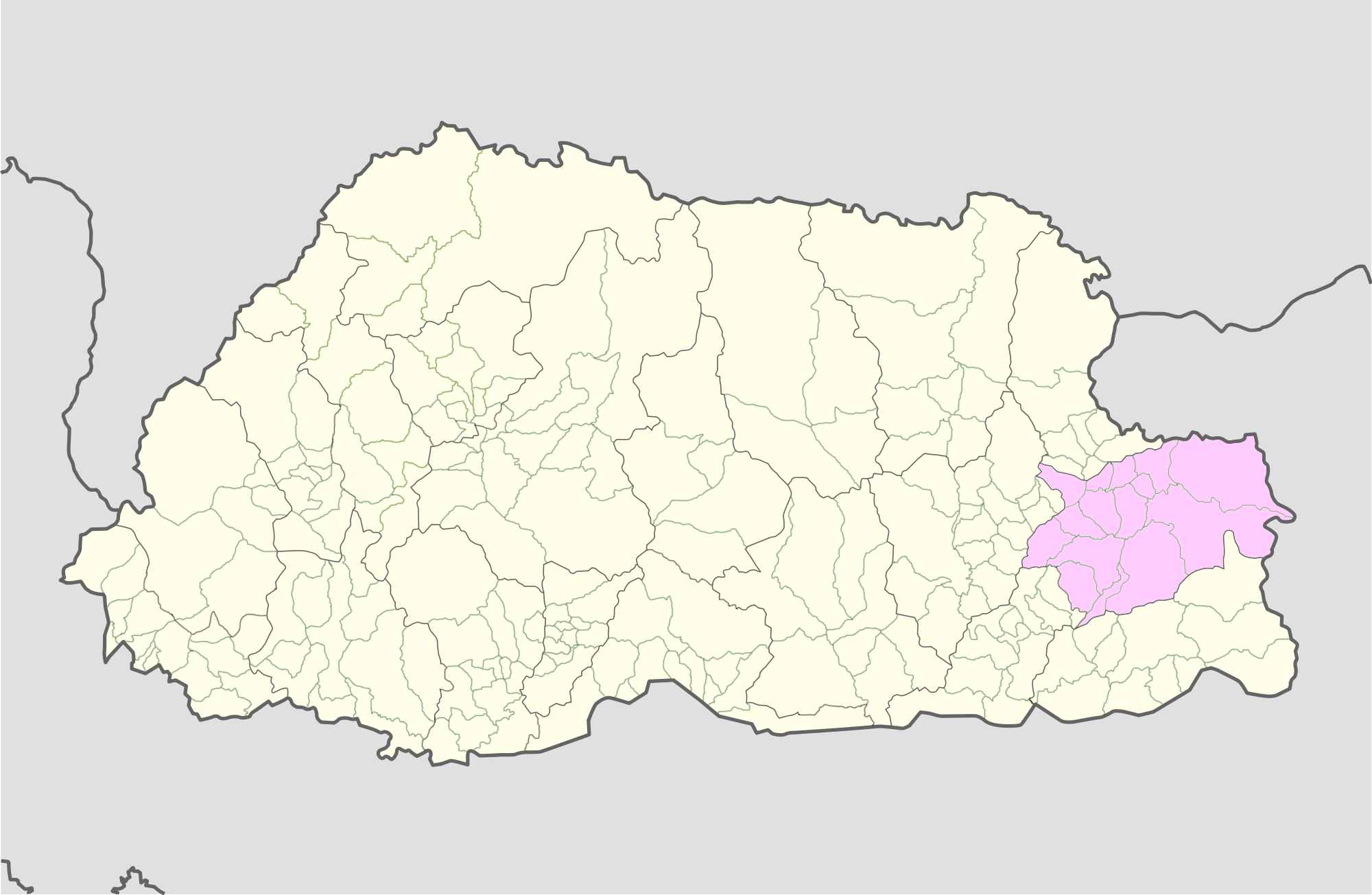
- Country: Bhutan
- District: Trashigang District
- Time zone: UTC+6 (BTT)

Radi Gewog (Dzongkha: ར་དི་) is a gewog (village block) of Trashigang District, Bhutan.

== Towns ==
Rangjung
