= Rangjung =

Rangjung རང་བྱུང་
- Town
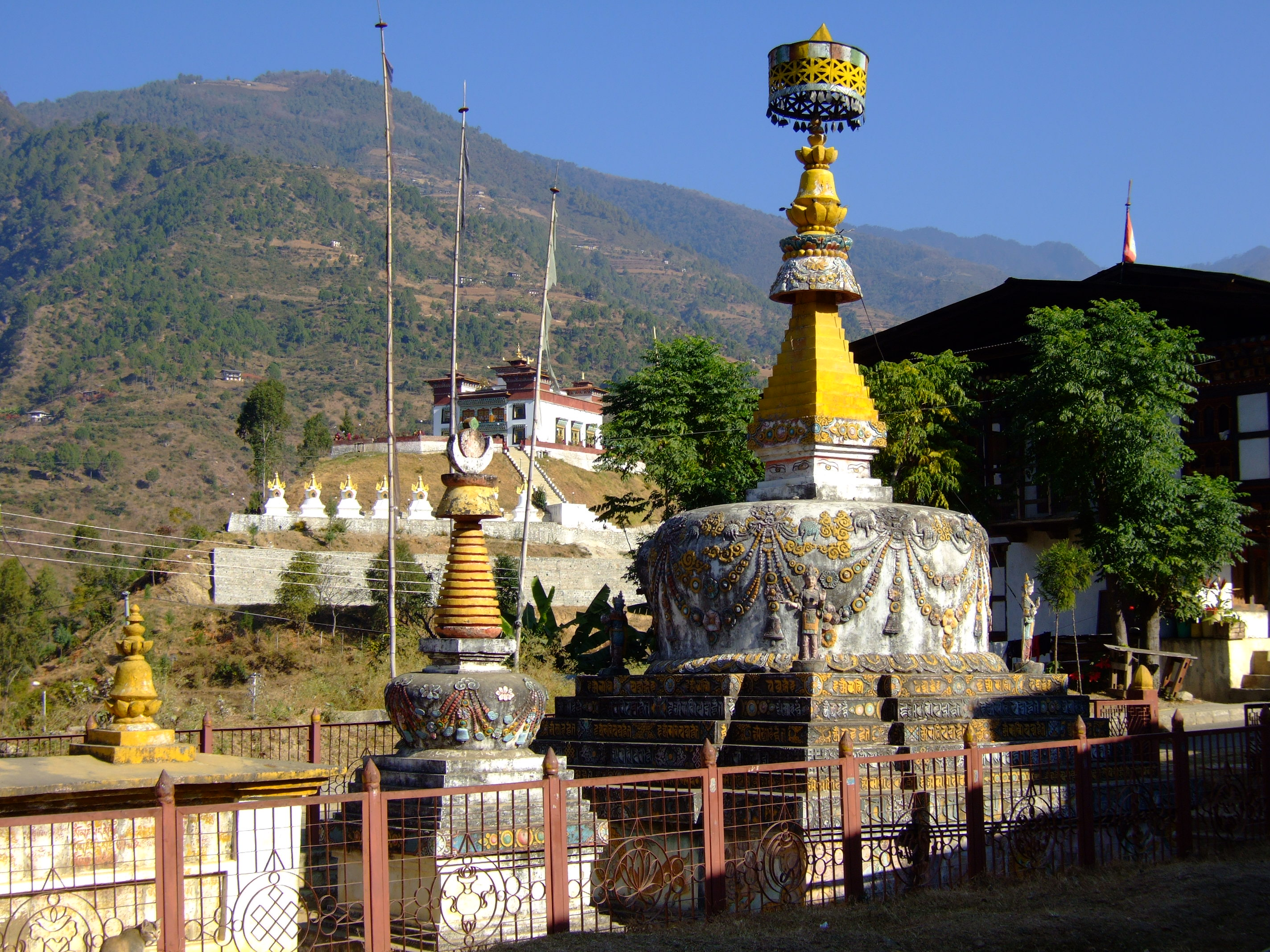
- Stupas at Rangjung, E. Bhutan

- Location in Bhutan
- Coordinates: 27°21′43″N 91°40′41″E
- Country: Bhutan
- District: Tashigang District
- Elevation: 3,670 ft (1,120 m)
- Time zone: UTC+6 (BTT)

Rangjung is a town on the Gamri River in the Shongphu Gewog of Tashigang District, East Bhutan.

The town is the location of Rangjung Oesel Choeling Monastery, established by Dungse Garab Dorje Rinpoche in 1989; and the Rangjung Vocational Training Institute (VTI) which offers certificate level courses in electrical engineering, computer hardware & networking, and furniture making. It is also the location of a small hydro-electric project.

Rangjung in Tibetan and probably as much in Dzongkha expresses the concept of a self-arisen manifestation. All over the Tibetan cultural sphere there are sacred seed syllables, mantras or depictions of deities that a presumed not to be man-made, but "rangjung", self arisen or autogenic. For example, in the Jokhang Temple in Lhasa is a rangjung goats head in a side chapel protruding out of a big rock.
