= Udzorong Gewog =

Udzorong Gewog ཨུ་མཛོ་རོང་
- Gewog
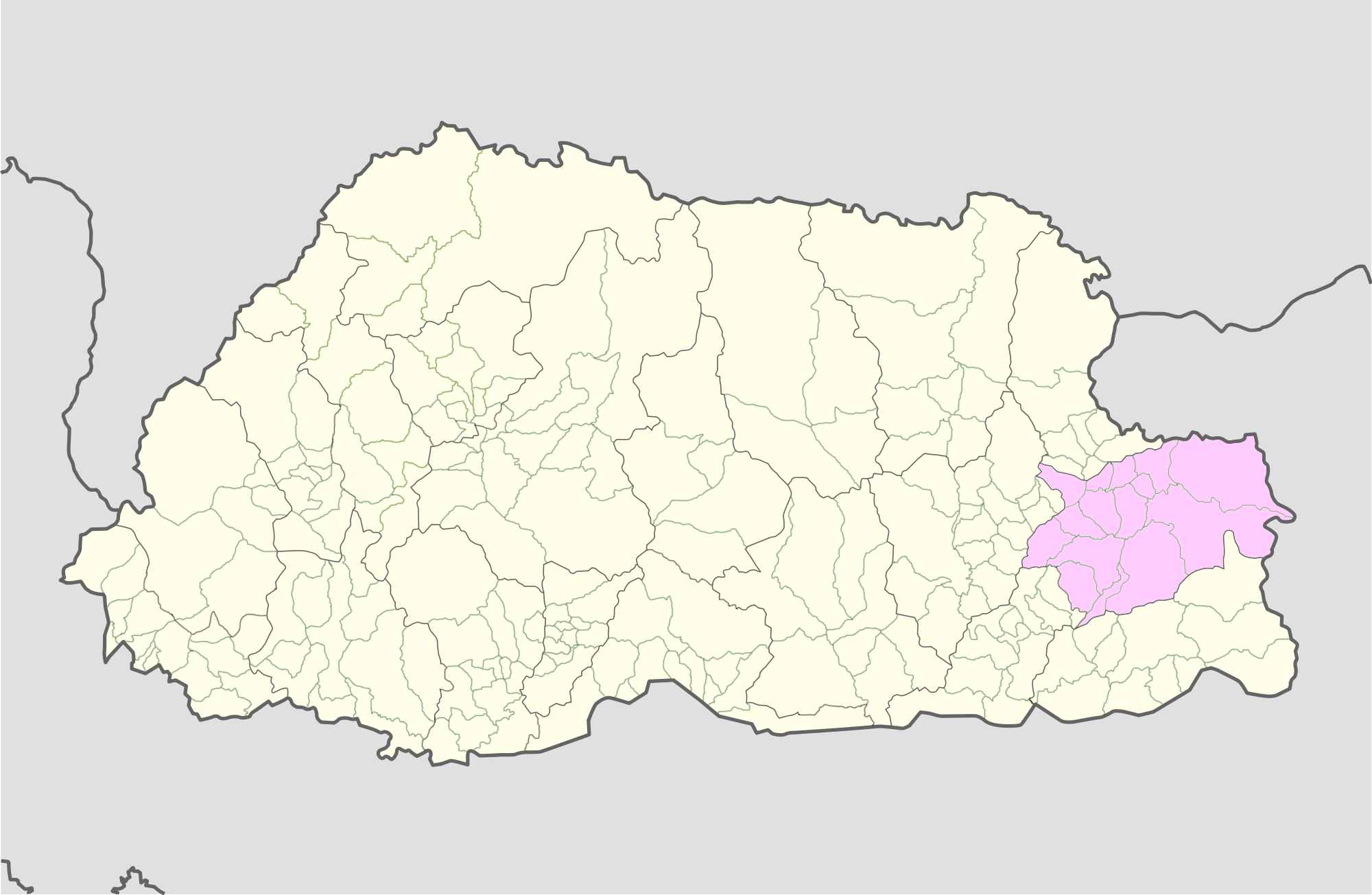
- Country: Bhutan
- District: Trashigang District
- Time zone: UTC+6 (BTT)

Udzorong Gewog (Dzongkha: ཨུ་མཛོ་རོང་) is one of the gewogs (village block) under Trashigang District, Bhutan.
