= Trashigang =

Trashigang

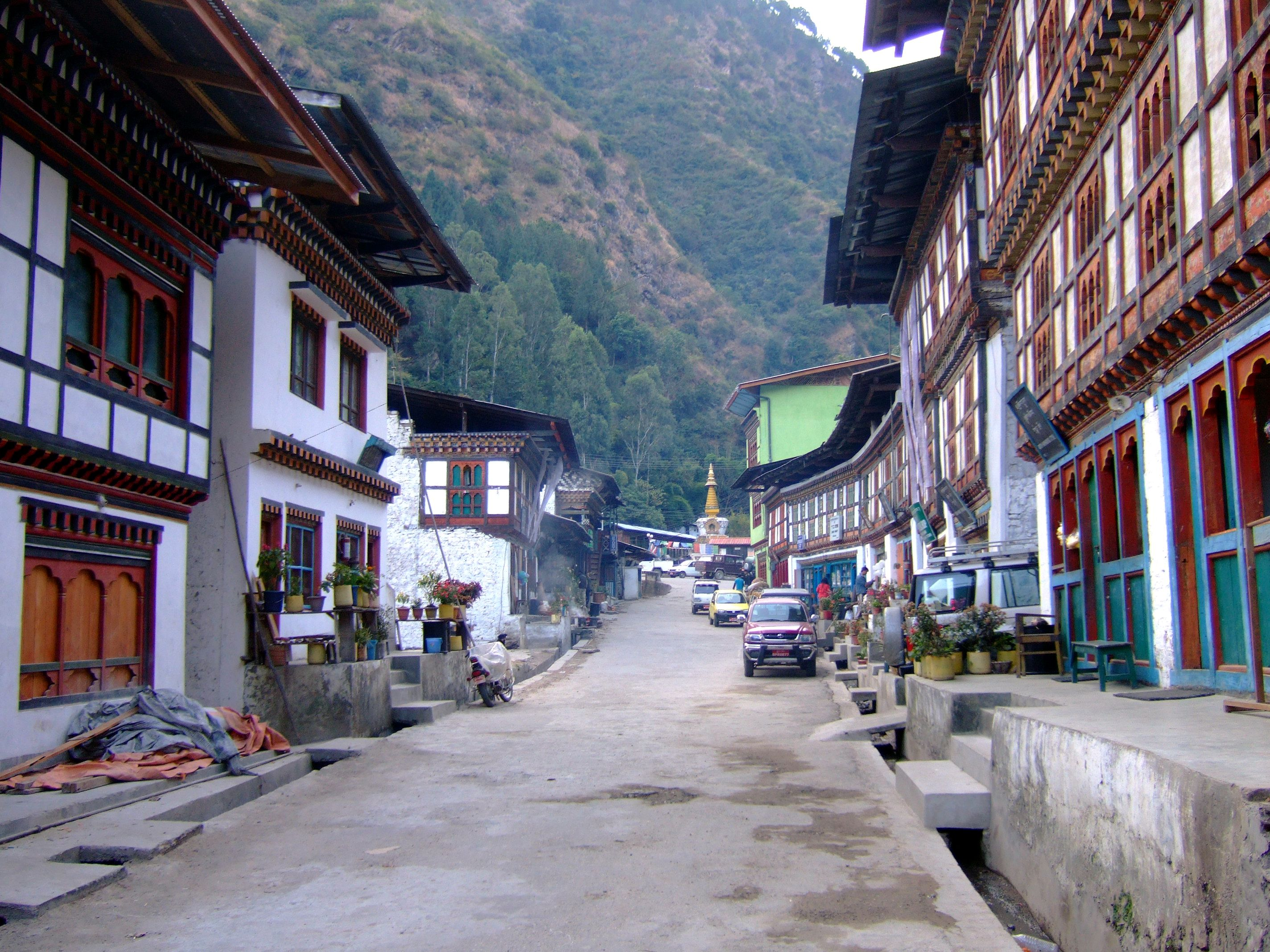
- Main street, Trashigang, Bhutan

- Location in Bhutan
- Coordinates: 27°19′57.2″N 91°33′09.9″E
- Country: Bhutan
- District: Trashigang District
- Village block: Samkhar Gewog

Population (2017)
  - Total: 3,037
- Time zone: UTC+6 (BTT)

Trashigang (Dzongkha: བཀྲ་ཤིས་སྒང་།), or Tashigang, meaning "fortress of auspicious mount," is a town in eastern Bhutan and the district capital of the Trashigang Dzongkhag (district).

The town lies to the east side of the valley above the Drangme Chhu river just south of where it is joined by the Gamri River. Trashigang is the eastern terminus of the Lateral Road, Bhutan's main highway leading to Phuntsholing in the southwest.

== History ==
Trashigang Dzong was built in 1659 by Trongsa Penlop Minjur Tenpa and served for centuries as an administrative headquarters and monastery, though government offices mostly relocated by 2011. Its sinking eastern foundation and crumbling upper walls necessitated either relocation or total destruction and reconstruction. In October 2011, dzong, under renovation since 2007, was on the verge of collapse. However, as of 2012, the Trashigang Dzong was still used for the town's yearly religious festival called tsechu.

== Demography ==
The population of Trashigang town was 3,037 (1,565 males and 1,472 females) according to the 2017 Population and Housing Census of Bhutan.

== Transport ==
Trashigang is served by Yonphula Airport which is around an hour drive from the town. It is connected by Simtokha Trashigang Primary National highway to the capital city, Thimphu, and by Trashigang Samdrup Jongkhar Highway to Samdrup Jongkhar, a border town in southeastern Bhutan.

== Climate ==
Trashigang features a dry-winter subtropical highland climate (Köppen Cwb).

Climate data for Kanglung, Trashigang District, elevation 1,930 m (6,330 ft), (1996–2017 normals)
Month	Jan	Feb	Mar	Apr	May	Jun	Jul	Aug	Sep	Oct	Nov	Dec	Year
Record high °C (°F)	24.0 (75.2)	25.5 (77.9)	29.0 (84.2)	30.0 (86.0)	31.0 (87.8)	32.5 (90.5)	33.0 (91.4)	32.0 (89.6)	31.5 (88.7)	31.0 (87.8)	27.0 (80.6)	24.5 (76.1)	33.0 (91.4)
Mean daily maximum °C (°F)	15.1 (59.2)	17.2 (63.0)	20.4 (68.7)	22.6 (72.7)	24.2 (75.6)	25.3 (77.5)	25.5 (77.9)	25.8 (78.4)	25.2 (77.4)	23.3 (73.9)	19.8 (67.6)	16.8 (62.2)	21.8 (71.2)
Daily mean °C (°F)	9.2 (48.6)	11.0 (51.8)	14.0 (57.2)	16.6 (61.9)	18.8 (65.8)	20.6 (69.1)	21.1 (70.0)	21.2 (70.2)	20.3 (68.5)	17.4 (63.3)	13.7 (56.7)	10.8 (51.4)	16.2 (61.2)
Mean daily minimum °C (°F)	3.2 (37.8)	4.8 (40.6)	7.6 (45.7)	10.6 (51.1)	13.3 (55.9)	15.9 (60.6)	16.6 (61.9)	16.5 (61.7)	15.3 (59.5)	11.5 (52.7)	7.5 (45.5)	4.7 (40.5)	10.6 (51.1)
Record low °C (°F)	−2.5 (27.5)	−1.0 (30.2)	1.0 (33.8)	3.0 (37.4)	8.0 (46.4)	11.5 (52.7)	14.0 (57.2)	13.5 (56.3)	11.0 (51.8)	4.0 (39.2)	2.0 (35.6)	0.0 (32.0)	−2.5 (27.5)
Average rainfall mm (inches)	9.5 (0.37)	20.8 (0.82)	49.4 (1.94)	109.6 (4.31)	119.2 (4.69)	194.5 (7.66)	247.2 (9.73)	208.3 (8.20)	123.2 (4.85)	77.5 (3.05)	4.1 (0.16)	4.4 (0.17)	1,167.7 (45.95)
Average rainy days	1.6	3.1	7.4	11.3	12.3	15.7	22.1	20.6	12.0	5.0	1.1	1.1	113.3
Average relative humidity (%)	66.7	66.8	67.9	72.5	77.0	83.5	85.8	85.3	83.5	75.6	70.9	69.3	75.4
Source 1: National Center for Hydrology and Meteorology
Source 2: World Meteorological Organization (rainy days 1996–2018)

== Gallery ==
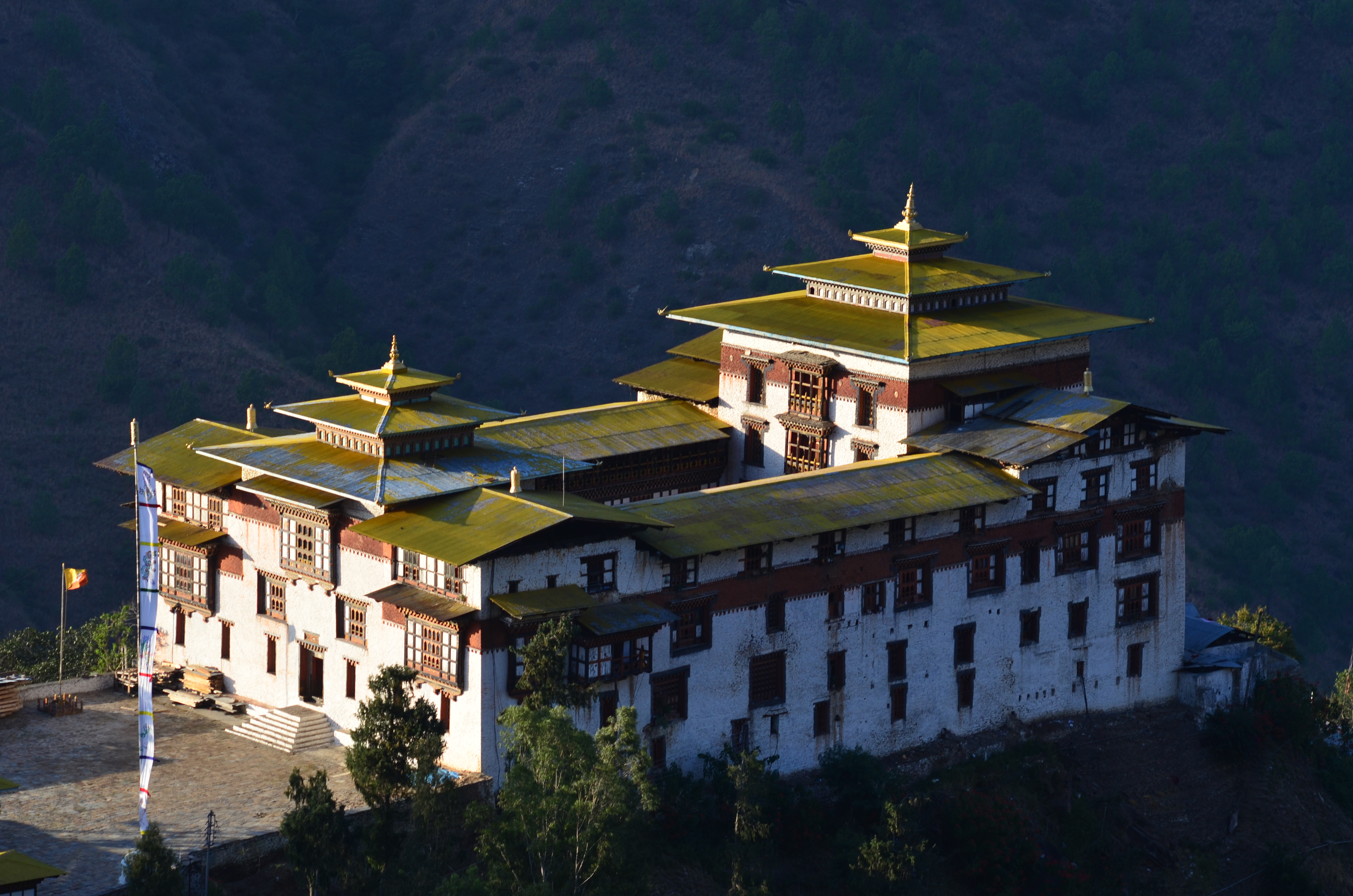
Trashigang Dzong (2011)

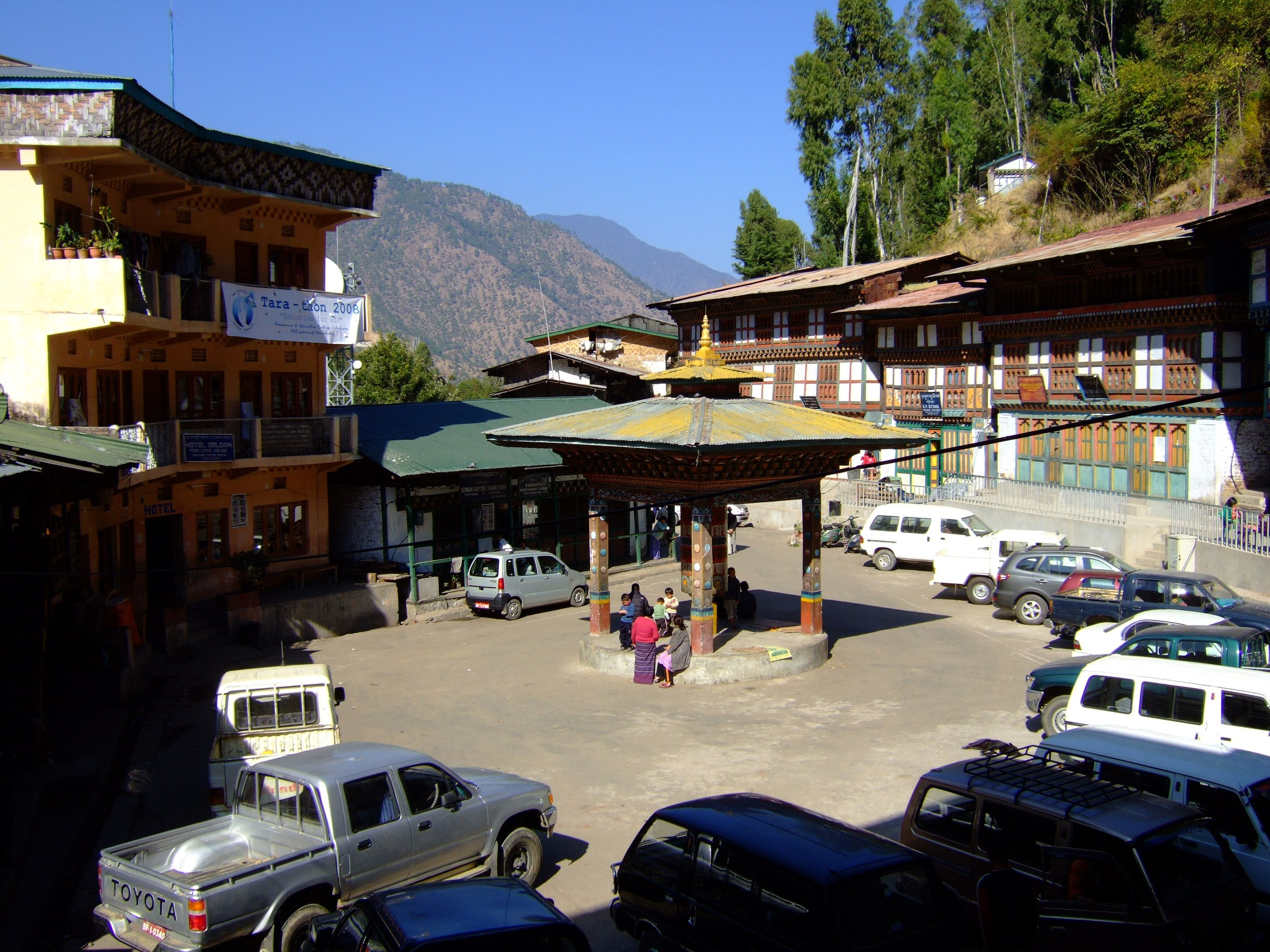
Town center, Trashigang, Bhutan (2008)

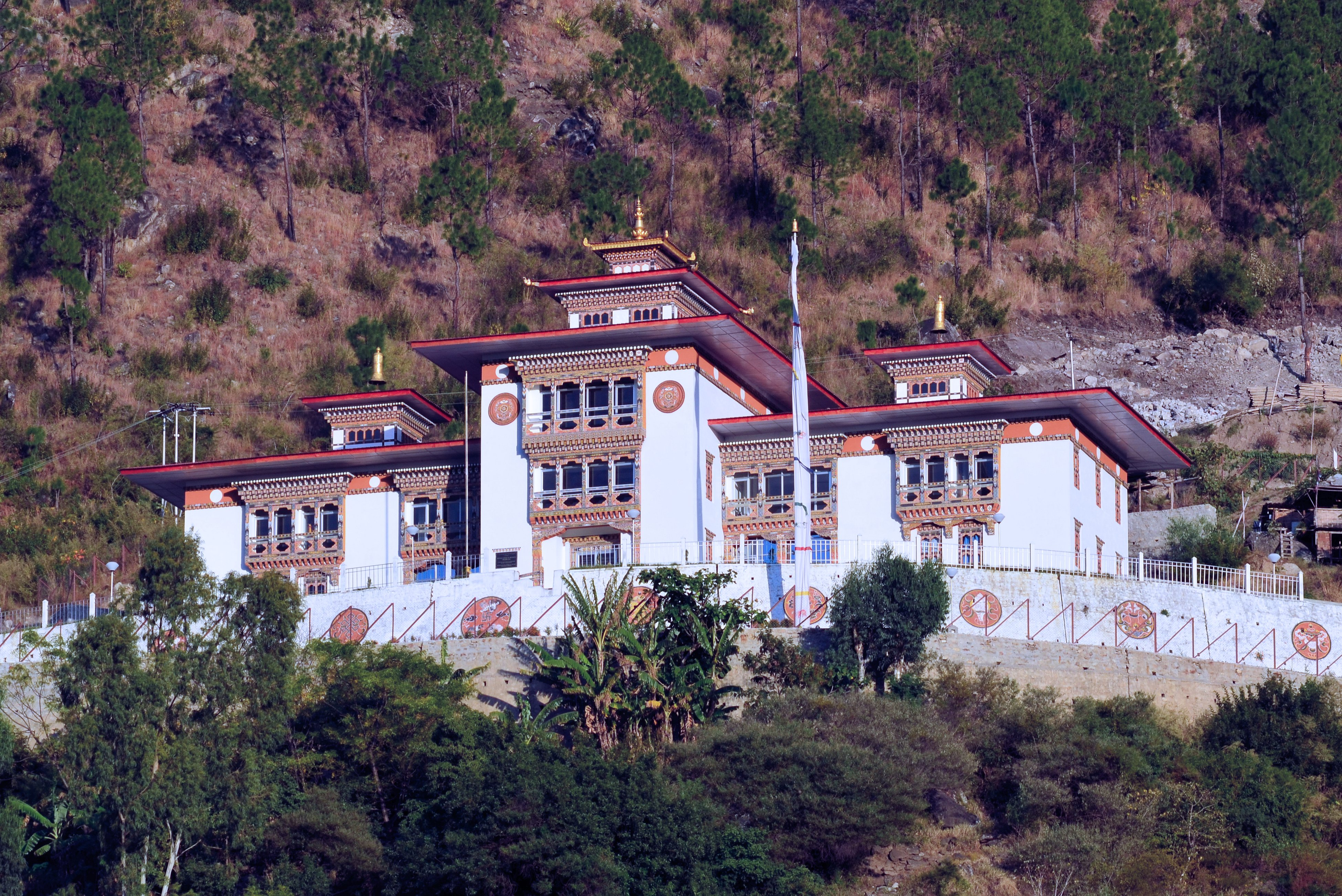
District court, Trashigang, Bhutan

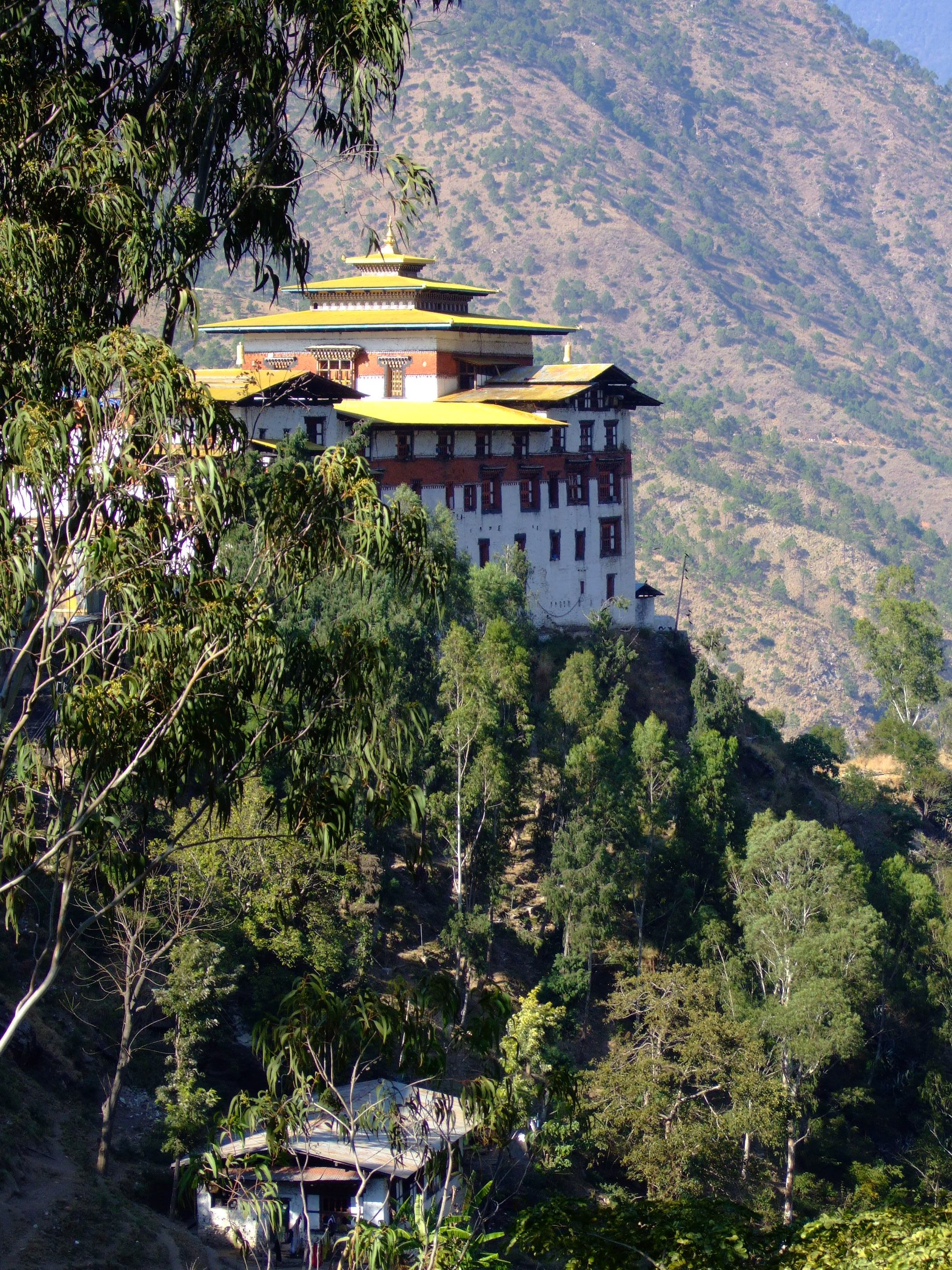
Trashigang Dzong (2008)

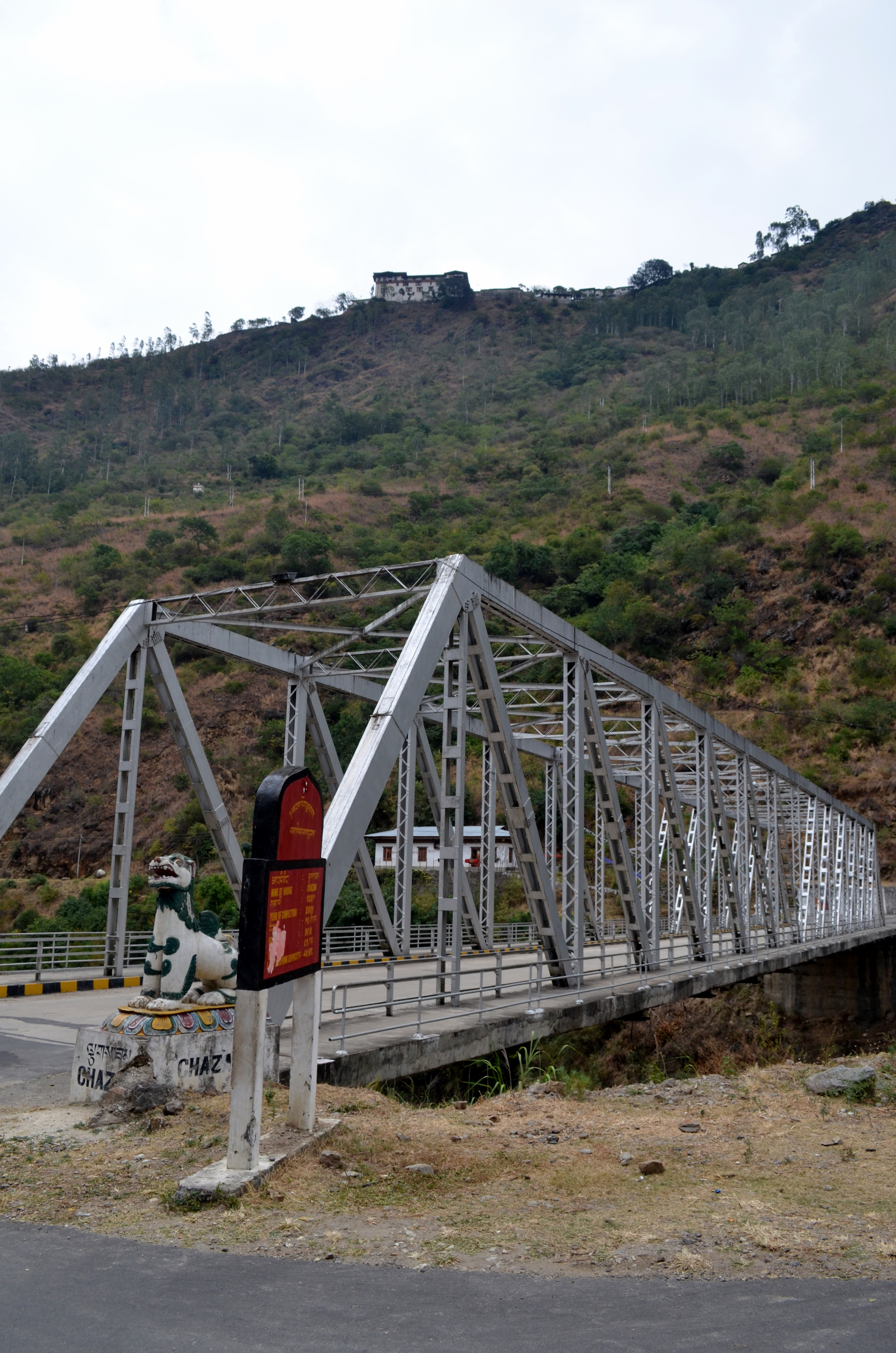
Trashigang Chagzam bridge

== Notable people ==
- Kinzang Lhamo, marathon and ultramarathon runner who competed in the 2024 Paris Olympics

== See also ==
- Chorten Kora
- Duksum
