= Radi, Bhutan =

- Location in Bhutan
- Coordinates: 27°22′N 91°41′E
- Country: Bhutan
- District: Trashigang District
- Time zone: UTC+6 (BTT)

Radi (or Radhi) is a town in Trashigang District in eastern Bhutan.

The town is located in the northern part of Trashigang. It is popularly known as the rice basket of the east. Following the royal decree, Bhutan became a democracy in 2008. Jigme Tshultrim is the first Member of Parliament from the Radi-Sakteng constituency which comprises four gewogs (blocks) named Radi, Phongmey, Merak and Sakteng. At the national assembly, Jigme Tsheltrim held the post of the speaker from 2008 to 2013.

Radi has a middle secondary school, a basic health unit, a gup (head of the local government), and an animal husbandry office. The area where the school is located is commonly known as fai singma, which means "a new house". This name was derived from when the school building was new in 1960s. Radhi is also blessed by many stupas and temples. Some of notable temples include Radhi Namdroel Choeling Goenpa, Khardung Yoesel Nunnery and many more.

Today, the gewog is connected by roads to almost all its villages and also to the neighbouring gewogs. The gewog was electrified from the Rangjung mini hydro power plant in 1998.

Rice is the main staple of food in Radi, but maize and other vegetables are also grown. However, paddy cultivation is solely dependent on monsoon rain which usually begins in June.
