= Yangnyer Gewog =

Yangnyer Gewog ཡངས་ཉེར་
- Gewog
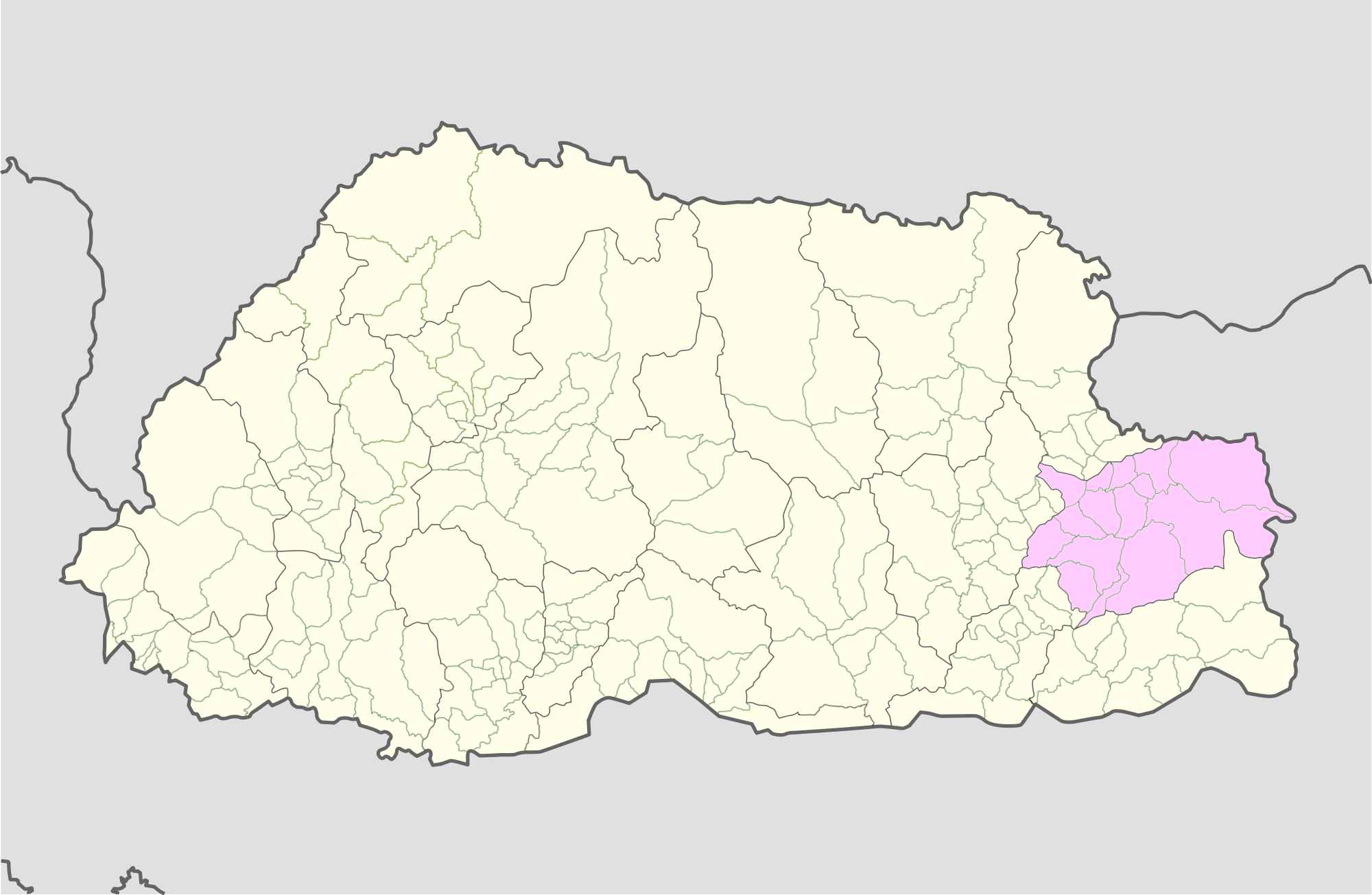
- Country: Bhutan
- District: Trashigang District
- Time zone: UTC+6 (BTT)

Yangnyer Gewog (Dzongkha: ཡངས་ཉེར་) is a gewog (village block) of Trashigang District, Bhutan.
