= Bidung Gewog =

Bidung Gewog སྦིས་གདུང་
- Gewog
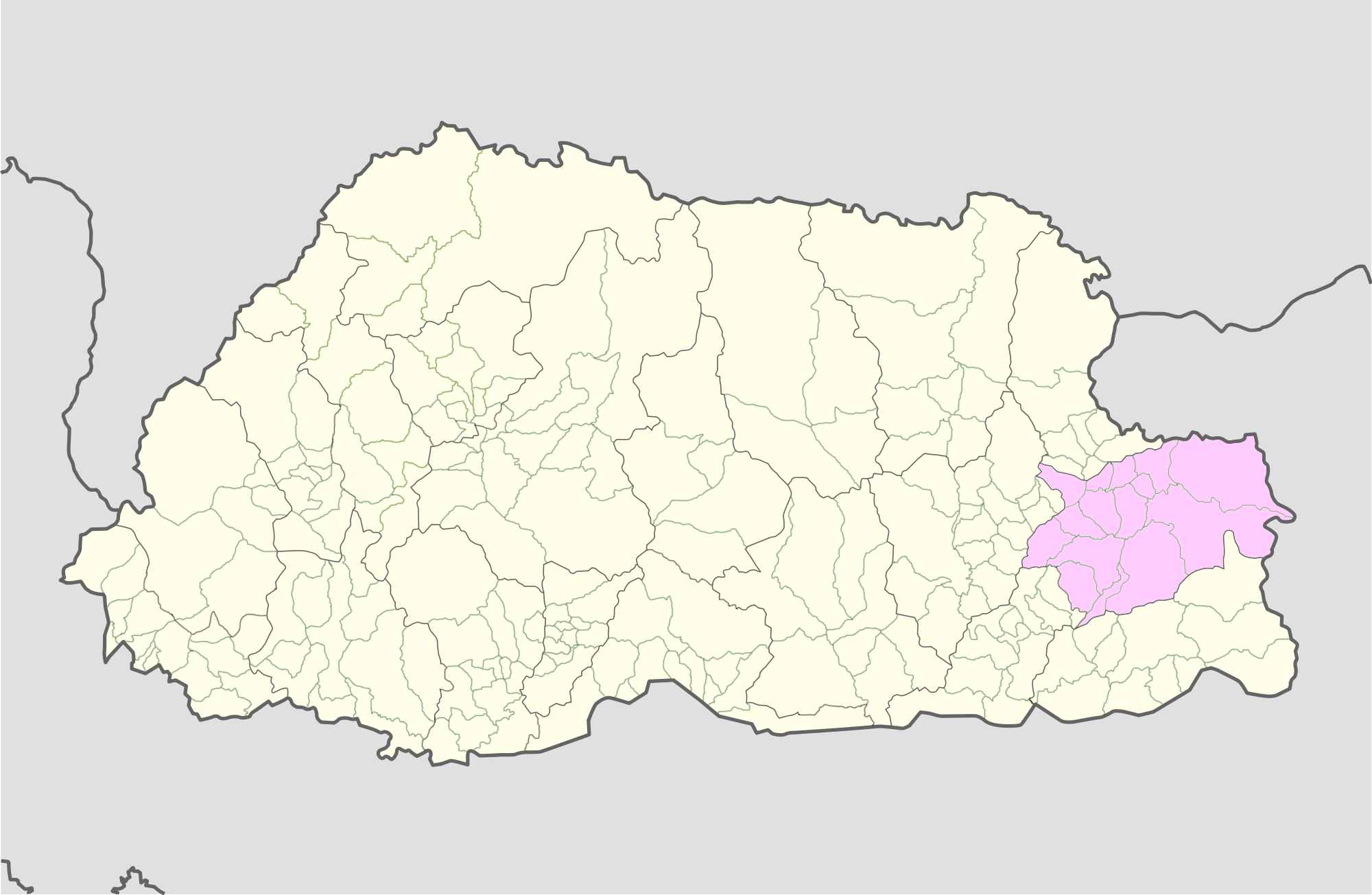
- Country: Bhutan
- District: Trashigang District
- Time zone: UTC+6 (BTT)

Bidung Gewog (Dzongkha: སྦིས་གདུང་) is a gewog (village block) of Trashigang District, Bhutan. Bidung was named after prophecy of the great treasurer Khedrup Kinga Wangpo, son of Pema Lingpa, and it is located in the northern part of Trashigang. Bidung has a population of 3911 in 515 households.
