= Phongmed Gewog =

Coordinates: 27.399°N 91.797°E

Phongmed Gewog ཕོངས་མེད་
- Gewog
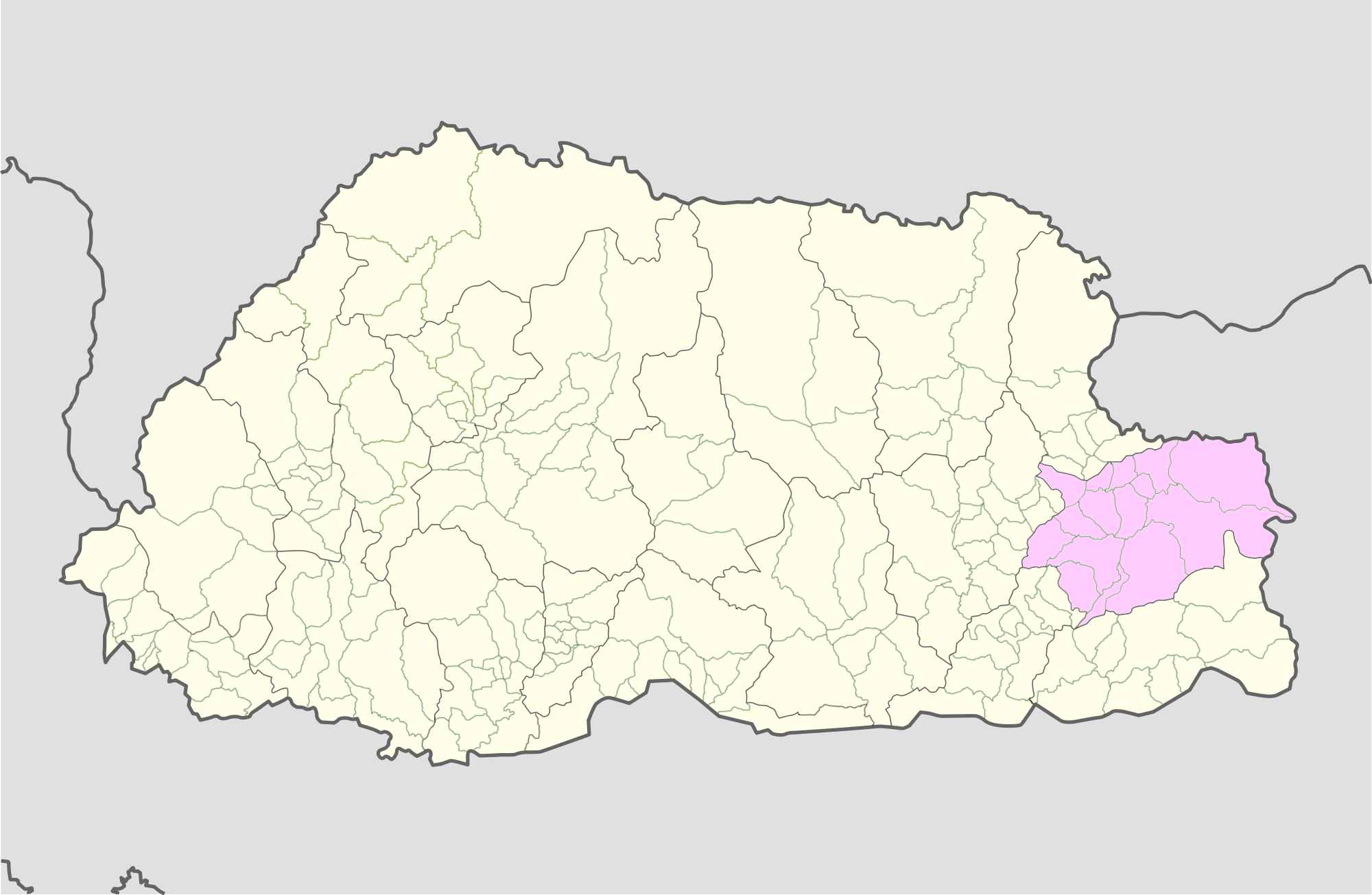
- Country: Bhutan
- District: Trashigang District
- Time zone: UTC+6 (BTT)

Phongmed Gewog (Dzongkha: ཕོངས་མེད་) is a gewog (village block) of Trashigang District, in the East of Bhutan.
