= Khaling Gewog =

Khaling
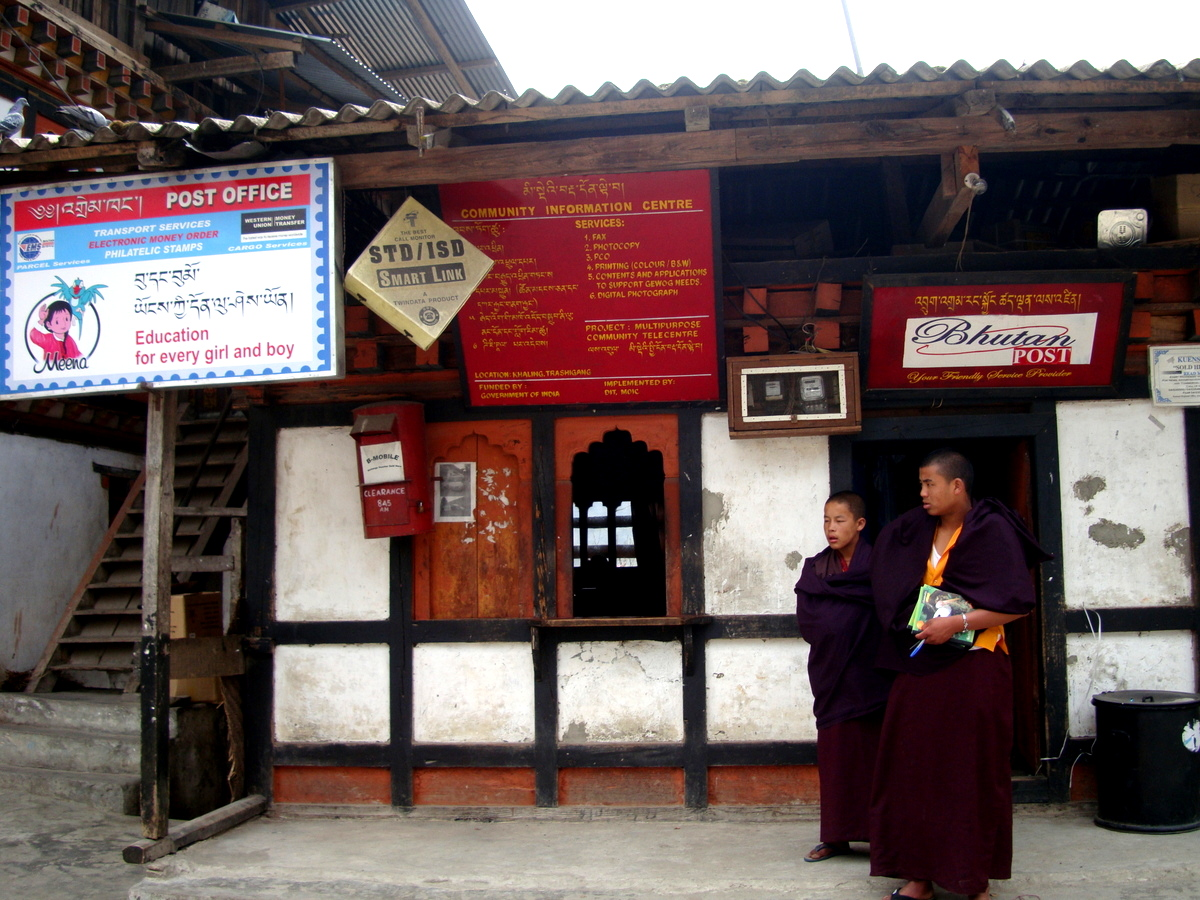
- Post office in Khaling

- Location in Bhutan
- Coordinates: 27°12′36″N 91°36′0″E
- Country: Bhutan
- District: Trashigang District

Population (2005)
  - Total: 1,349
- Time zone: UTC+6
- ZIP Code: 42003

Khaling Gewog (Dzongkha: ཁ་གླིང་) is a gewog (village block) of Trashigang District, Bhutan. Khaling and Lumang Gewogs comprise Wamrong Dungkhag (sub-district).

== Etymology ==
The origin of the name can be found in the blending of "Kha", which means bird in Sharchop, the language of Eastern Bhutan, and "ling", which means 'valley' in Dzongkha, the national language.

== Jigme Sherubling Higher Secondary School ==
Jigme Sherubling Higher Secondary School, also known as Jigsher, was established in 1978. The school was officially inaugurated in 1979 by Her Royal Highness Dechen Wangmo Wangchuk and was initially named "Jigme Sherubling Central School." It began with an enrollment of 250 students, including 50 girls, and a faculty of 15 expatriate teachers. Father William Mackey, SJ, a key figure in the development of secondary education in Bhutan, significantly contributed to the school's foundation.

In 1996, the school was upgraded to include Class XII arts and commerce streams under the I.S.C. board, and it has since added a science stream. The school celebrated its Silver Jubilee on May 16, 2003.
