= Shongphoog Gewog =

Shongphoog Gewog ཤོང་ཕུག་
- Gewog
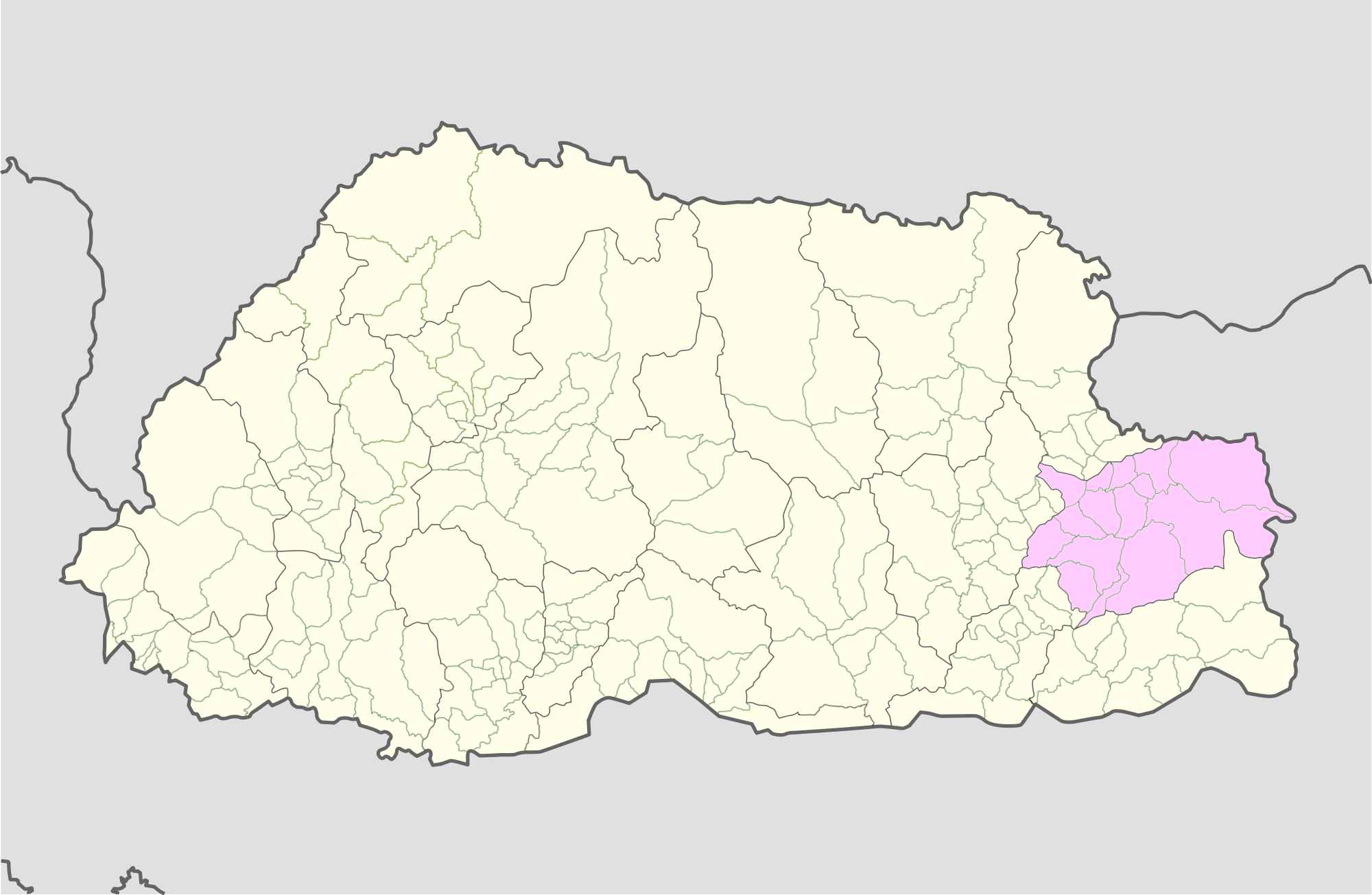
- Country: Bhutan
- District: Trashigang District

Area
  - Land: 92.4 km^{2} (35.7 sq mi)

Population (2017)
  - Total: 3,949
- Time zone: UTC+6 (BTT)

Shongphoog Gewog (Dzongkha: ཤོང་ཕུག་), also spelled Shongphu is a gewog (village block) of Trashigang District, Bhutan. Shongphu Gewog is located to the northeast of Trashigang Dzong.

== Administration ==
It has five chiwogs: Changmey-Rangjung, Galing, Yobinang-Gongsephangma, Shongphu and Chaling. The Gewog Tshonde is has seven members.

== Demographics ==
As per the information of year 2017, Shongphu Gewog has a total population of 3,949 of that 2,072 male and 1,877 female.

== Climate ==
Shongphoog has a hot and humid summer and is extremely cold in winter.
