= Samkhar Gewog =

Samkhar Gewog བསམ་མཁར་
- Gewog
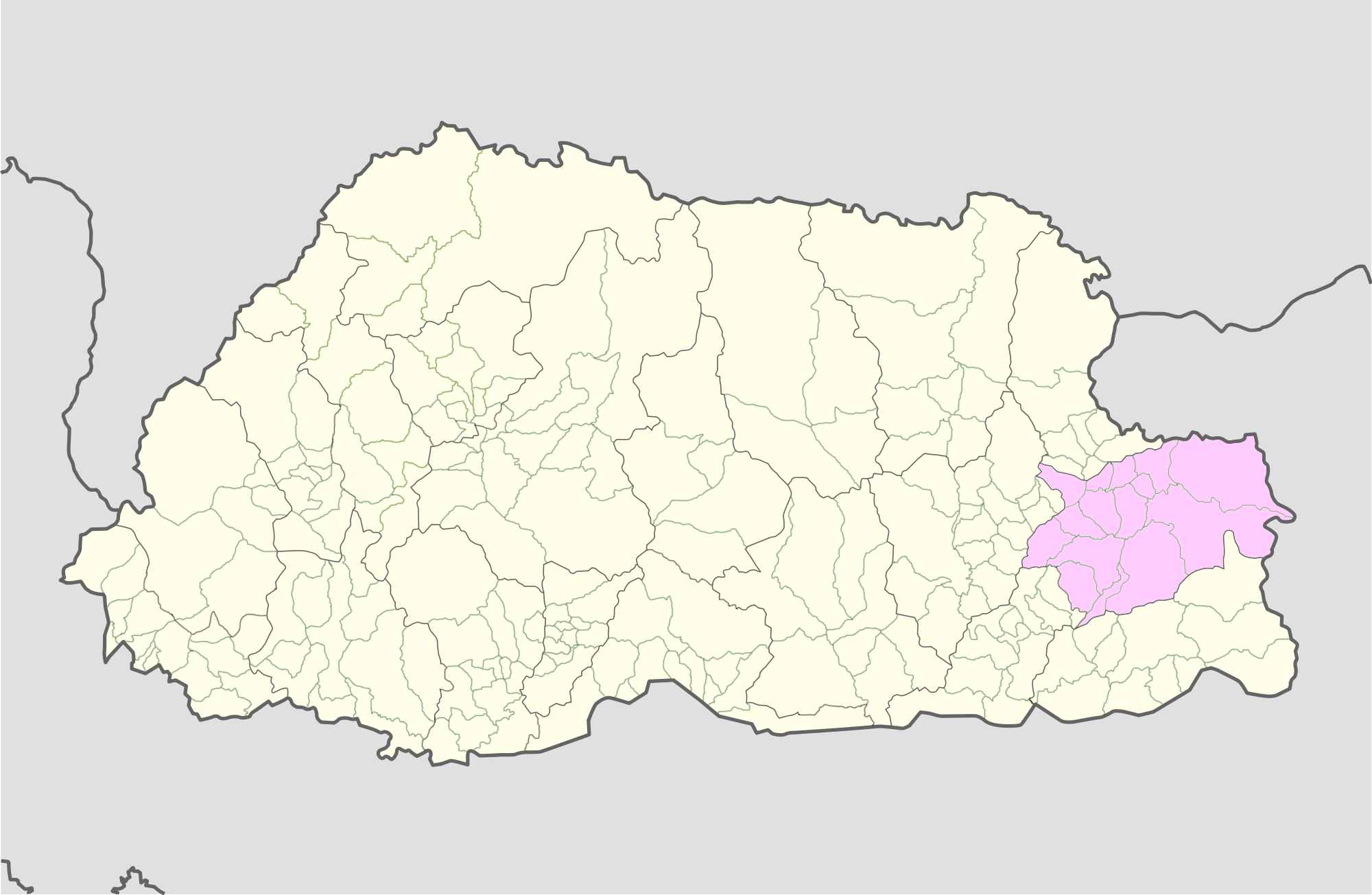
- Country: Bhutan
- District: Trashigang District
- Time zone: UTC+6 (BTT)

Samkhar Gewog (Dzongkha: བསམ་མཁར་) is a gewog (village block) of Trashigang District, Bhutan.
