= Bartsham Gewog =

Bartsham Gewog བར་མཚམས་
- Gewog
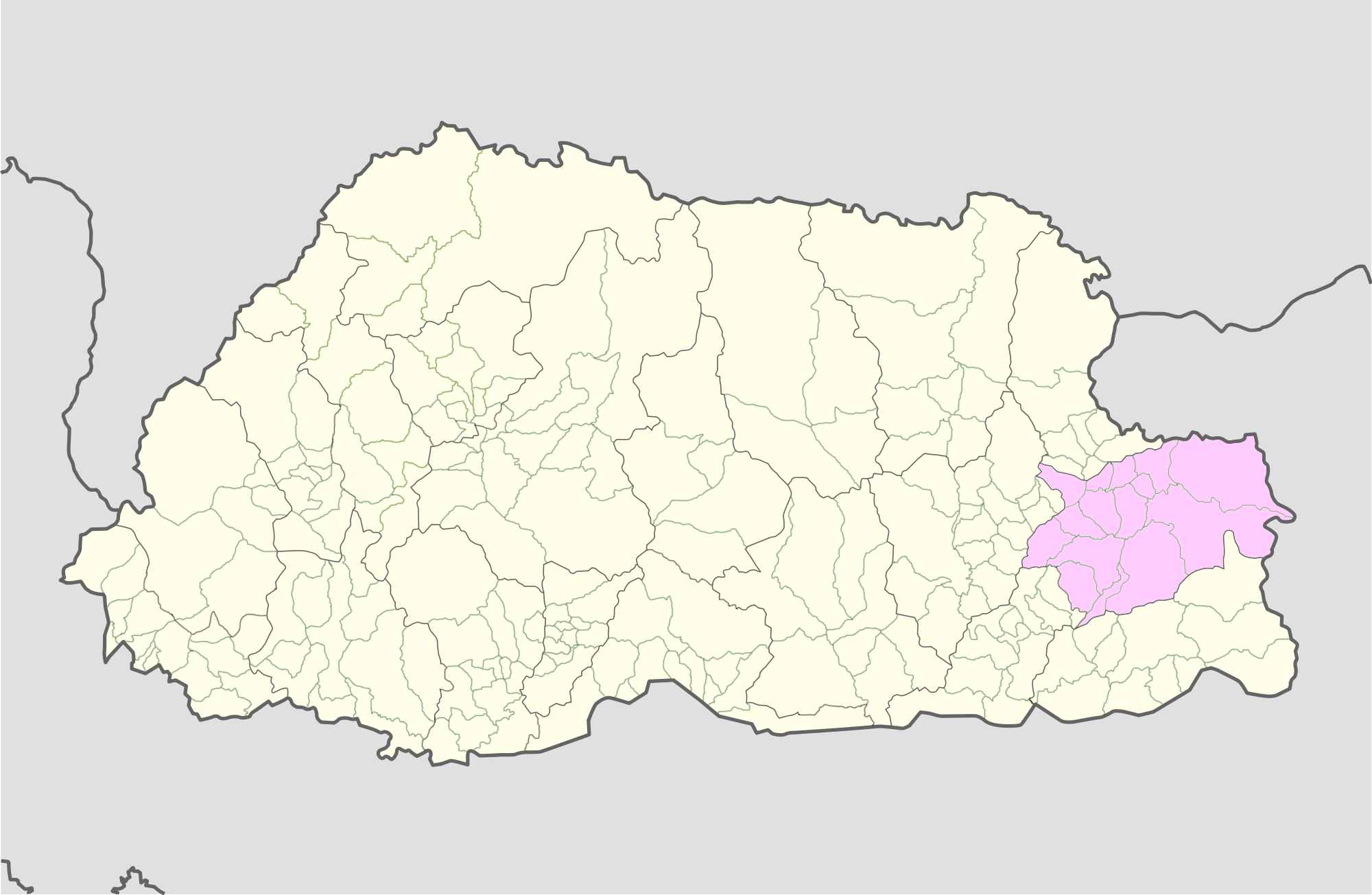
- Country: Bhutan
- District: Trashigang District
- Time zone: UTC+6 (BTT)

Bartsham Gewog (Dzongkha: བར་མཚམས་) is a gewog (village block) of Trashigang District, Bhutan. The community of Bartsham gewog depends on agriculture farming and the maximum source of income is from vegetable farming.

The Gewog is popular for Bartsham Chador Lhakhang. The Lhakhang is considered sacred as it houses the thumb-size replica of the Chador Statue discovered from Yuetsho Lake of Pemagatshel. Bartsham Lhakhang is said to grant wishes, guard against snake bites, heal leprosy, and bestow women with children.
