= Sakteng Gewog =

Sagteng Gewog སག་སྟེང་
- Gewog
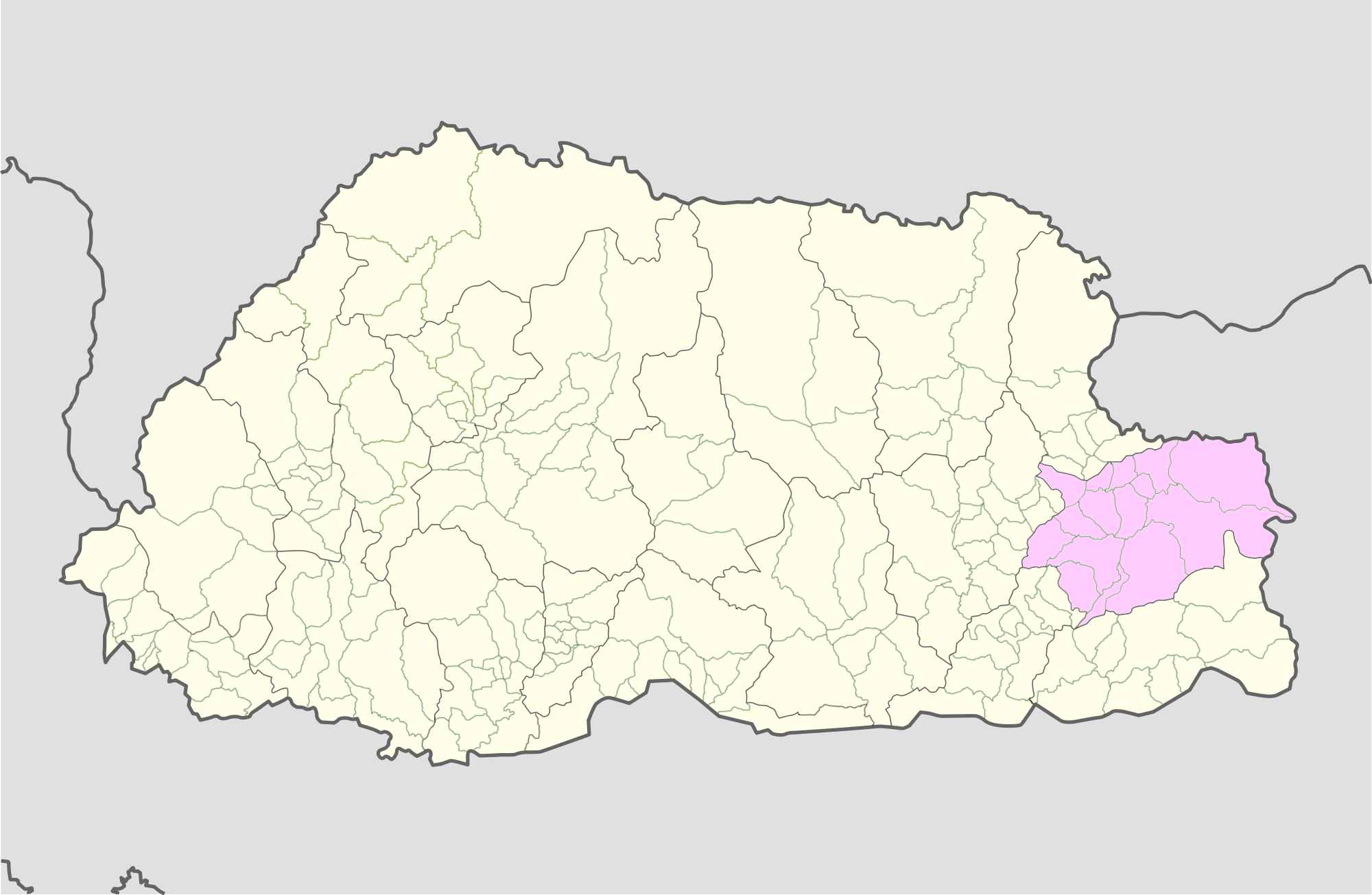
- Country: Bhutan
- District: Trashigang District
- Time zone: UTC+6 (BTT)

Sagteng Gewog (Dzongkha: སག་སྟེང་, romanized: sag steng), also called Sakteng is a gewog (village block) of Trashigang District, Bhutan.

Sakteng Gewog office was established in 2005 with an area of 910 sq.km, which is located under Trashigang Dzongkhag where this area comprises nomadic people. The area is also a protected area, one of Bhutan’s wildlife conservation areas, which consists of rare blue poppies and people mainly depend on the livestock’s products for their living. Merak Gewog is within Sakten Dungkhag.The people usually speak a local language called Jyops and their neighbours call it Brahmilo. Much of the gewog lies within the Sakteng Wildlife Sanctuary.
