= Merag Gewog =

Merag Gewog མེ་རག་
- Gewog
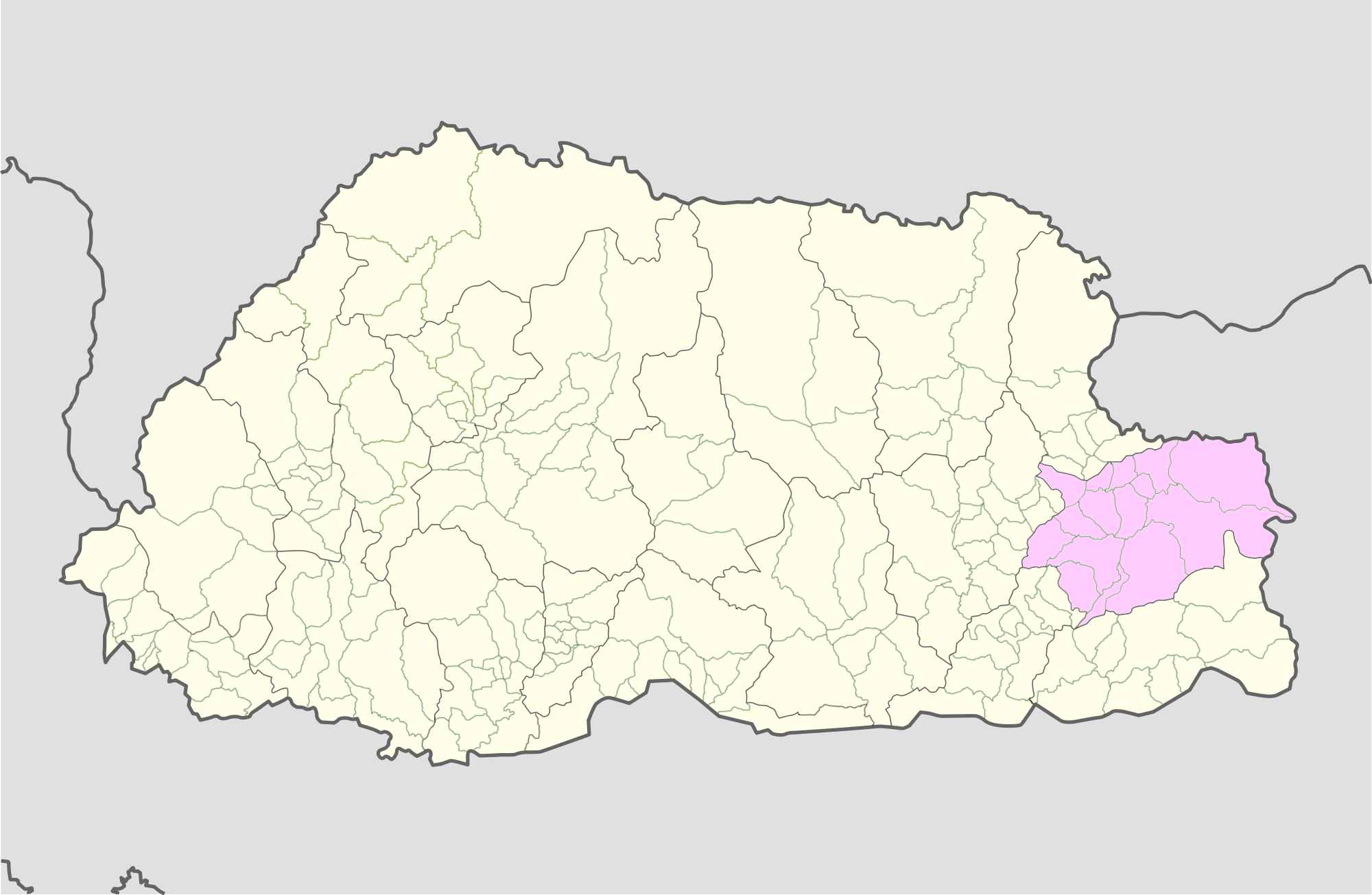
- Country: Bhutan
- District: Trashigang District
- Time zone: UTC+6 (BTT)

Merag Gewog (Dzongkha: མེ་རག་, romanized: me rag) is a gewog (village block) of Trashigang District, Bhutan. Merak and Sakten Gewogs comprise Sakten Dungkhag (sub-district).

== Economy ==
Yak and sheep farming have traditionally been the main occupations in Merag, though sheep farming is on the decline due to it being more arduous and there being a distinct lack of grazeable pasture. Yak milk and butter are produced, along with yak hair for weaving clothes.
