= Trashigang District =

District of Bhutan

Coordinates: 27°15′N 91°40′E

Trashigang District བཀྲ་ཤིས་སྒང་རྫོང་ཁག།
- District
- Location of Trashigang district within Bhutan
- Country: Bhutan
- Headquarters: Trashigang

Area
  - Total: 3,066 km^{2} (1,184 sq mi)

Population (2017)
  - Total: 45,518
  - Density: 14.85/km^{2} (38.45/sq mi)
- Time zone: UTC+6 (BTT)
- HDI (2019): 0.578 medium · 19th of 20
- Website: www.trashigang.gov.bt

Trashigang District (Dzongkha: བཀྲ་ཤིས་སྒང་རྫོང་ཁག།; Wylie: Bkra-shis-sgang rdzong-khag; also spelled "Tashigang") is Bhutan's easternmost dzongkhag (district).

== Culture ==
The population of the district is mainly Sharchop, which means "easterner" in Dzongkha, the national language.

== Languages ==
The dominant language of Trashigang is Tshangla (Sharchopkha), the lingua franca of eastern Bhutan. Two significant minority languages are spoken in the far eastern region of the district: the East Bodish Dakpa language and the Southern Bodish Brokpa language. Dakpa is spoken by descendants of yakherding communities, and may in fact be a divergent dialect of Brokpake, heavily influenced by Dzalakha.

== Economy and education ==
While it has no major urban area, Trashigang has the densest population in Bhutan. It used to be part of an important trade route connecting Assam to Tibet, and still is a primary route for Bhutanese trade with India. Towns include Trashigang (the district capital), Radi, Rangjung, and Phongmey. The district produces rice and lavender.

There are several tourist packages to Bhutan that include trips from Thimphu to Trashigang, despite the 17-hour journey from the capital over the rough and dangerous Lateral Road.

Trashigang is also the site of Sherubtse College, the original college within the Royal University of Bhutan system.

== Landmarks ==
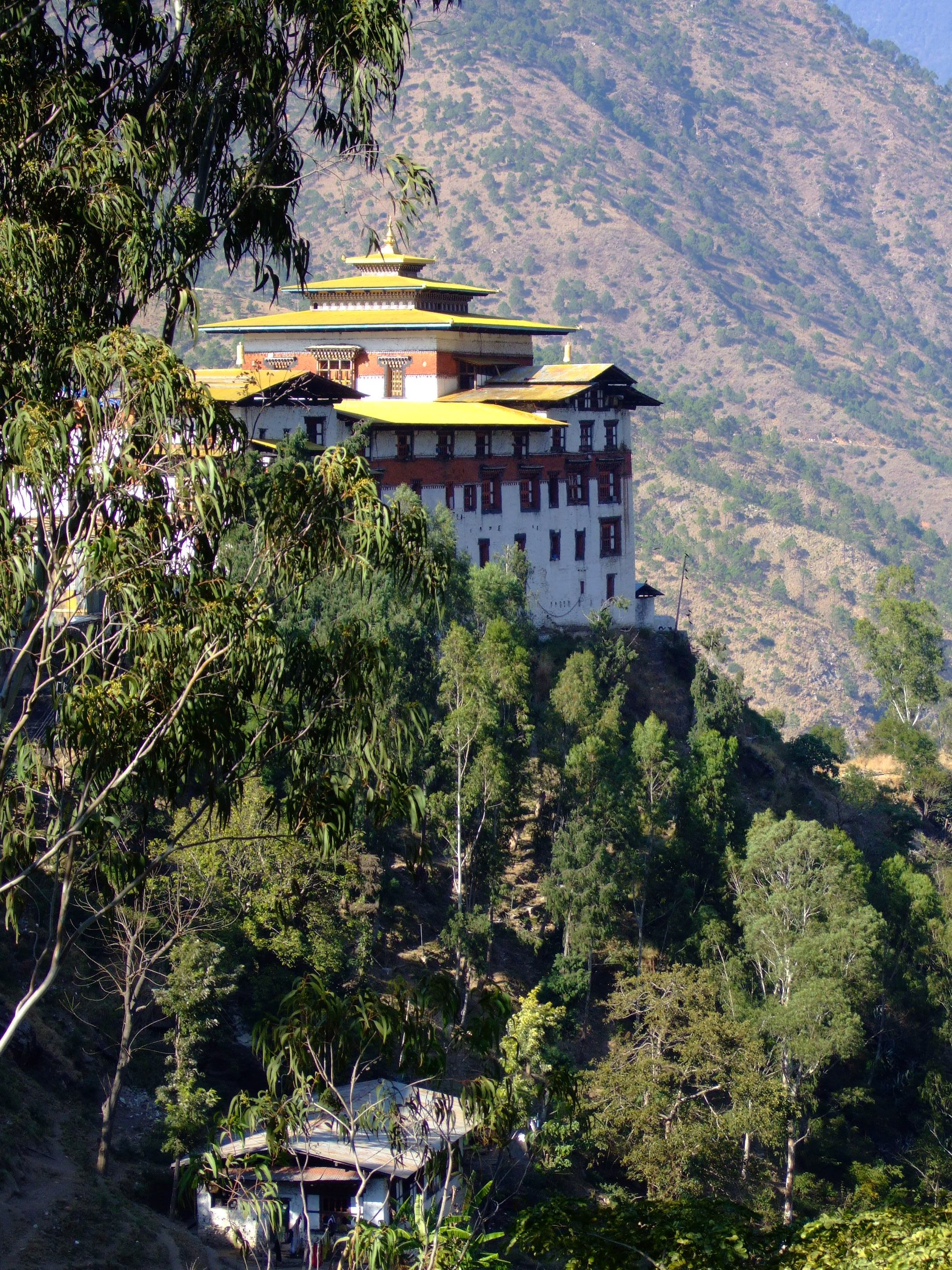
Trashigang Dzong

Trashigang Dzong, or fortress, was built in 1659 by the third Druk Desi Chögyal Mingyur Tenpa to defend against Tibetan invaders. Because of its altitude, invading armies remarked that "it is not a dzong on the ground, it is in the sky".

An ancient lhakhang or temple in the district, known for its rock garden, contains a sacred footprint said to be either that of Guru Rimpoche or that of a khandroma (angel).

Rangjung, 16 km east of the district capital, is the site of Rangjung Ösel Chöling Monastery, established by Dungse Garab Dorje Rinpoche in 1989. The temple contains particularly fine images of Padmasambhava, Shantarakshita and Chögyal Trisong Detsen (Khen-Lop-Chö sum).

Bartsham Chador Lhakhang is a sacred Lhakhang in Bartsham Gewog that houses the thumb-size replica of the Chador Statue discovered from Yuetsho Lake in Dungsam Pemagatshel.

== Administrative divisions ==
Trashigang District is divided into fifteen village blocks (or gewogs):

- Bartsham Gewog
- Bidung Gewog
- Kanglung Gewog
- Kangpara Gewog
- Khaling Gewog
- Lumang Gewog
- Merak Gewog
- Phongmey Gewog
- Radhi Gewog
- Sakten Gewog
- Samkhar Gewog
- Shongphu Gewog
- Thrimshing Gewog
- Uzorong Gewog
- Yangneer Gewog

== Protected area ==
The Sakteng Wildlife Sanctuary, one of ten protected areas of Bhutan, was created in part to protect the migoi, a type of yeti in whose existence most Bhutanese believe. The sanctuary covers the eastern third of the district (the gewogs of Merag and Sakteng), and is connected via biological corridor to Khaling Wildlife Sanctuary in Samdrup Jongkhar District to the south.

== Climate ==
Climate data for Kanglung, Trashigang District, elevation 1,930 m (6,330 ft), (1996–2017 normals)
Month	Jan	Feb	Mar	Apr	May	Jun	Jul	Aug	Sep	Oct	Nov	Dec	Year
Record high °C (°F)	24.0 (75.2)	25.5 (77.9)	29.0 (84.2)	30.0 (86.0)	31.0 (87.8)	32.5 (90.5)	33.0 (91.4)	32.0 (89.6)	31.5 (88.7)	31.0 (87.8)	27.0 (80.6)	24.5 (76.1)	33.0 (91.4)
Mean daily maximum °C (°F)	15.1 (59.2)	17.2 (63.0)	20.4 (68.7)	22.6 (72.7)	24.2 (75.6)	25.3 (77.5)	25.5 (77.9)	25.8 (78.4)	25.2 (77.4)	23.3 (73.9)	19.8 (67.6)	16.8 (62.2)	21.8 (71.2)
Daily mean °C (°F)	9.2 (48.6)	11.0 (51.8)	14.0 (57.2)	16.6 (61.9)	18.8 (65.8)	20.6 (69.1)	21.1 (70.0)	21.2 (70.2)	20.3 (68.5)	17.4 (63.3)	13.7 (56.7)	10.8 (51.4)	16.2 (61.2)
Mean daily minimum °C (°F)	3.2 (37.8)	4.8 (40.6)	7.6 (45.7)	10.6 (51.1)	13.3 (55.9)	15.9 (60.6)	16.6 (61.9)	16.5 (61.7)	15.3 (59.5)	11.5 (52.7)	7.5 (45.5)	4.7 (40.5)	10.6 (51.1)
Record low °C (°F)	−2.5 (27.5)	−1.0 (30.2)	1.0 (33.8)	3.0 (37.4)	8.0 (46.4)	11.5 (52.7)	14.0 (57.2)	13.5 (56.3)	11.0 (51.8)	4.0 (39.2)	2.0 (35.6)	0.0 (32.0)	−2.5 (27.5)
Average rainfall mm (inches)	9.5 (0.37)	20.8 (0.82)	49.4 (1.94)	109.6 (4.31)	119.2 (4.69)	194.5 (7.66)	247.2 (9.73)	208.3 (8.20)	123.2 (4.85)	77.5 (3.05)	4.1 (0.16)	4.4 (0.17)	1,167.7 (45.95)
Average rainy days	1.6	3.1	7.4	11.3	12.3	15.7	22.1	20.6	12.0	5.0	1.1	1.1	113.3
Average relative humidity (%)	66.7	66.8	67.9	72.5	77.0	83.5	85.8	85.3	83.5	75.6	70.9	69.3	75.4
Source 1: National Center for Hydrology and Meteorology
Source 2: World Meteorological Organization (rainy days 1996–2018)

== See also ==
- Districts of Bhutan
- Kurmaed Province
- Merak
- Ngalangkang
