= Telephone numbers in Bhutan =

- Country: Bhutan
- Continent: Asia
- Numbering plan type: closed
- Country code: +975
- International access: 00
- Long-distance: none

Fixed telephone subscriptions per 100 people in Bhutan

Typical format for telephone numbers in Bhutan are: +975 xy ...... (mobile) and +975 x ...... (fixed line).

== Fixed Line ==
National Significant Numbers (NSN): seven digits

Area code length: one digit
Subscriber number length: six digits

Format: +975 x ......

=== Area codes ===
List of area codes:

2 - Thimphu, Simtokha, Dechencholing, Taba, Kharsadrapchu, Basochu, Wangdue, Punakha, Lingshi DAMA, Gasa
3 - Trongsa, Jakar, Chumey, Zhemgang DAMA, Zhemgang, Tingtibi
4 - Trashigang, Kanglung, Lhuntse, Tangmachu, Rangjung, Wamrong, Khaling, Mongar, Sakteng DAMA, Gelpoyshing, Trashi Yangtse, Tsenkharla
5 - Phuntsholing, Pasakha, Gedu, Tala, Padechu, Sinchekha, Lhamoi Zingkha, Samtse, Gomtu, Chargary, Sibsoo
6 - Gelephu, Suray, Lodrai, Sarpang, Tsirang, Damphu DAMA, Dagana, Dagapela, Drujegang, Panbang DAMA
7 - Jongkhar, Deothang, Nganglam, Bangtar DAMA, Daifam DAMA, Nganglam DAMA, Gatshel, Gatshel DAMA
8 - Paro, Drukgyel Dzong, Shaba, Ha, Damthang, Chapcha, Wangkha, Tsimasham

== Mobile Operator ==
Mobile numbers: eight digit NSN

Mobile operator code : two digit
Subscriber number : six digits

Format: +975 xy ......

=== Mobile operator codes ===
17 - B-Mobile
16 - B-Mobile
77 - TashiCell
02 - Fixline

== Special number ==
110 - Fire department
112 - Emergency medical services
113 - Police
1600 - Bhutan Telecom
7700 - TashiCell
