= Panbang =

Panbang སྤན་བང
- Location in Bhutan
- Coordinates: 26°52′N 90°59′E
- Country: Bhutan
- District: Zhemgang District
- Sub-district: Panbang Dungkhag
- Village block: Ngangla Gewog

Population (2017)
  - Total: 800

Panbang is a settlement in the south of Bhutan. It is located in Zhemgang District, close to the border with India. Its the seat of Ngangla Gewog.

== Etymology ==
The name is possibly derived from Khengkhar Pan, a name for Bamboo boats and Bang, meaning plain or ground.

== Geography ==
Panbang is located at the confluence of the Mangdechhu and Drangmechhu rivers at the subtropical foothills of the Himalayas with an altitude of 314 m above sea level. The town borders Royal Manas National Park along the southern and eastern extends and is located in the Lower Kheng region of Zhemgang under Ngangla Gewog. Panbang directly borders Sonamthang, Thinleygang and Marangdued villages.

== Governance ==
Panbang is a Yenleg Thromde. Tungkutenpa is a satellite town across the Drangmechhu river being identifed as apart of Panbang in 2013.

The Panbang Dungkhag Court and Panbang Dungkhag Office are both located in Panbang.

In 2023, Panbang, Tungkutenpa and Sonamthang were declared apart of Gelephu Mindfulness City.

== Demographics ==
At the 2005 census, the population was 379. At the 2017 census, the population was 800. The population of Panbang is predominantly Khengpa.

== Economy ==
=== Agriculture ===
Panbang and the surrounding villages predominantly grow Ginger as a traditional cash crop, with Mandarin and Agarwood plantations being introduced in the 1970s by Keiji Nishioka.

=== Tourism ===
In 2021, the Tourism Council of Bhutan began a Eco-Tourism project in Panbang, piloting Ecolodges.

Panbang host the Manas Winter Festival, an annual festival funded by the Bhutanese and Zhemgang administrations to promote Lower Kheng culture and tourism in the region. The festival began in 2025.

== Infrastructure ==
=== Roads ===
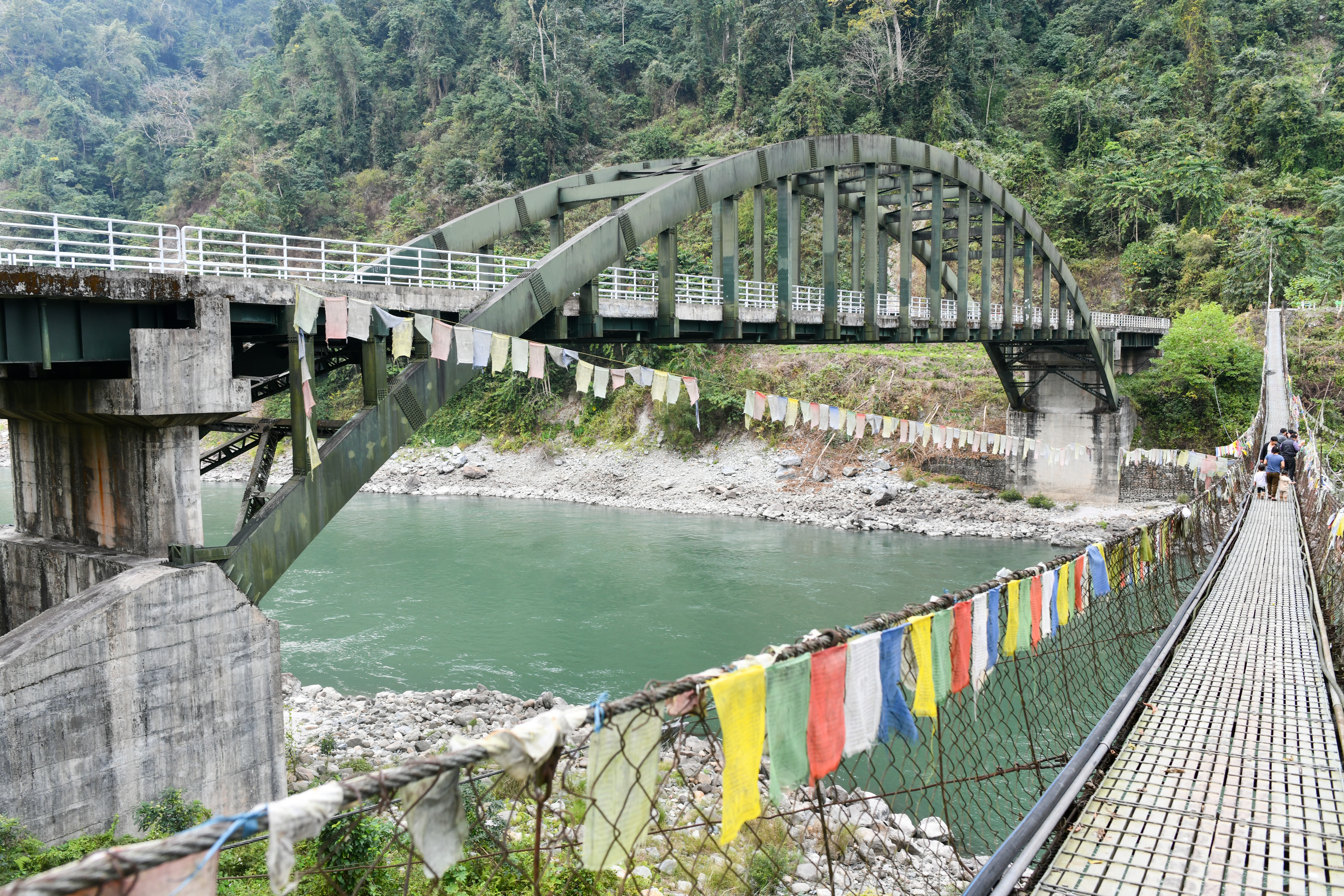
Panbang Bridge in 2019

Panbang is connected to Tingtibi and Gongphu by the Tingtibi-Panbang Highway (PNH 07), to Nganglam by the Nganglam-Panbang Highway and to Bjoka gewog by the Panbang-Bjoka Road.

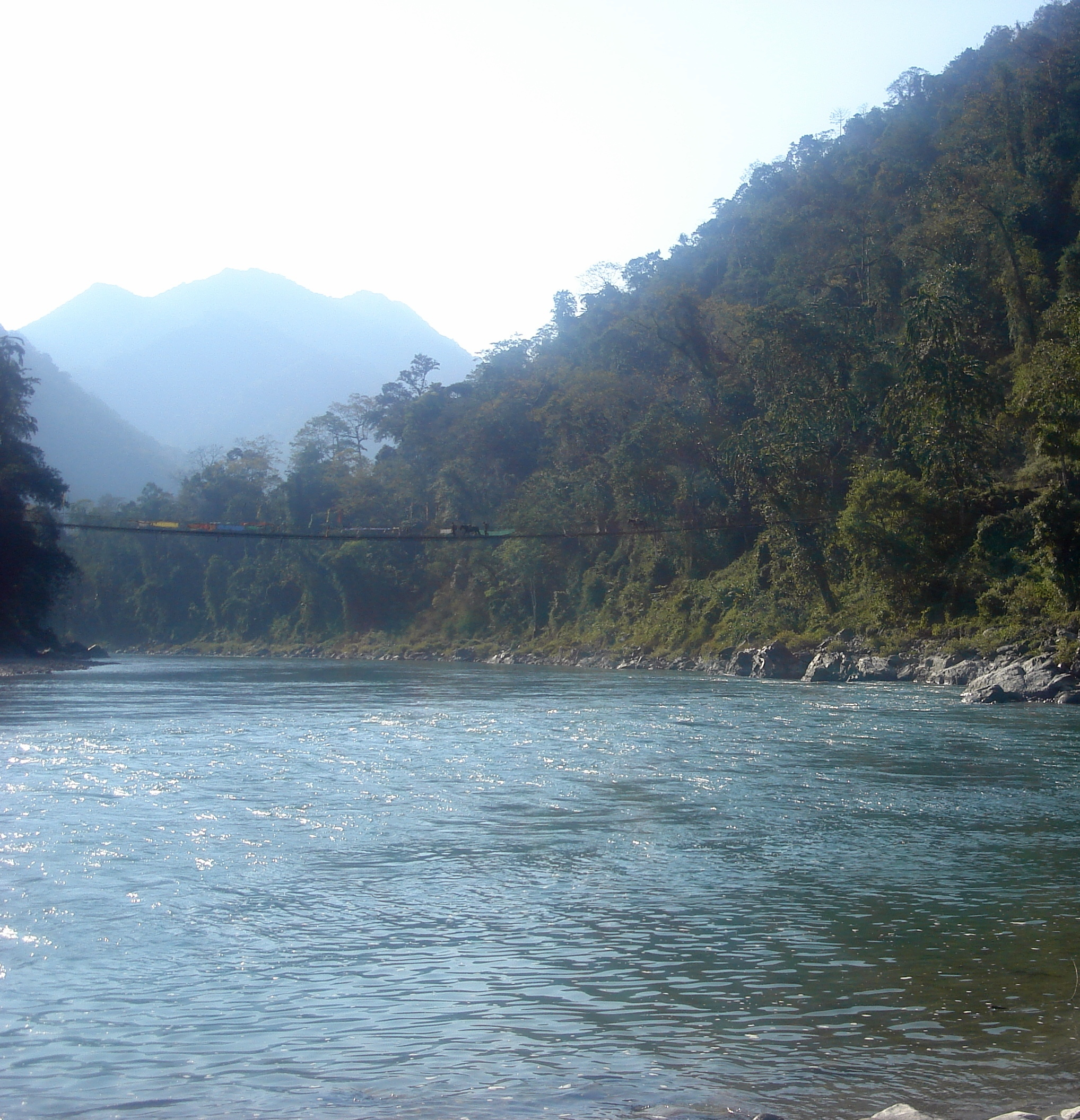
Dasho Nishioka Suspension Bridge in 2006

The Panbang Bridge over Dragmechhu river is 152-metre-long motor bridge connecting Panbang to Tungkutenpa, being opened in 2013. It was build next to the Dasho Nishioka suspension bridge, which was build in 1985.

=== Utilities ===
Healthcare is handled by the Panbang Basic Health Unit, alongside with the Gelephu Regional Referral Hospital located in Gelephu.

== Education ==
The only primary institution in the town is Panbang Primary School. Secondary education in Panbang and adjacent villages being supported by Sonamthang Central School, established in 1979 as a primary school.

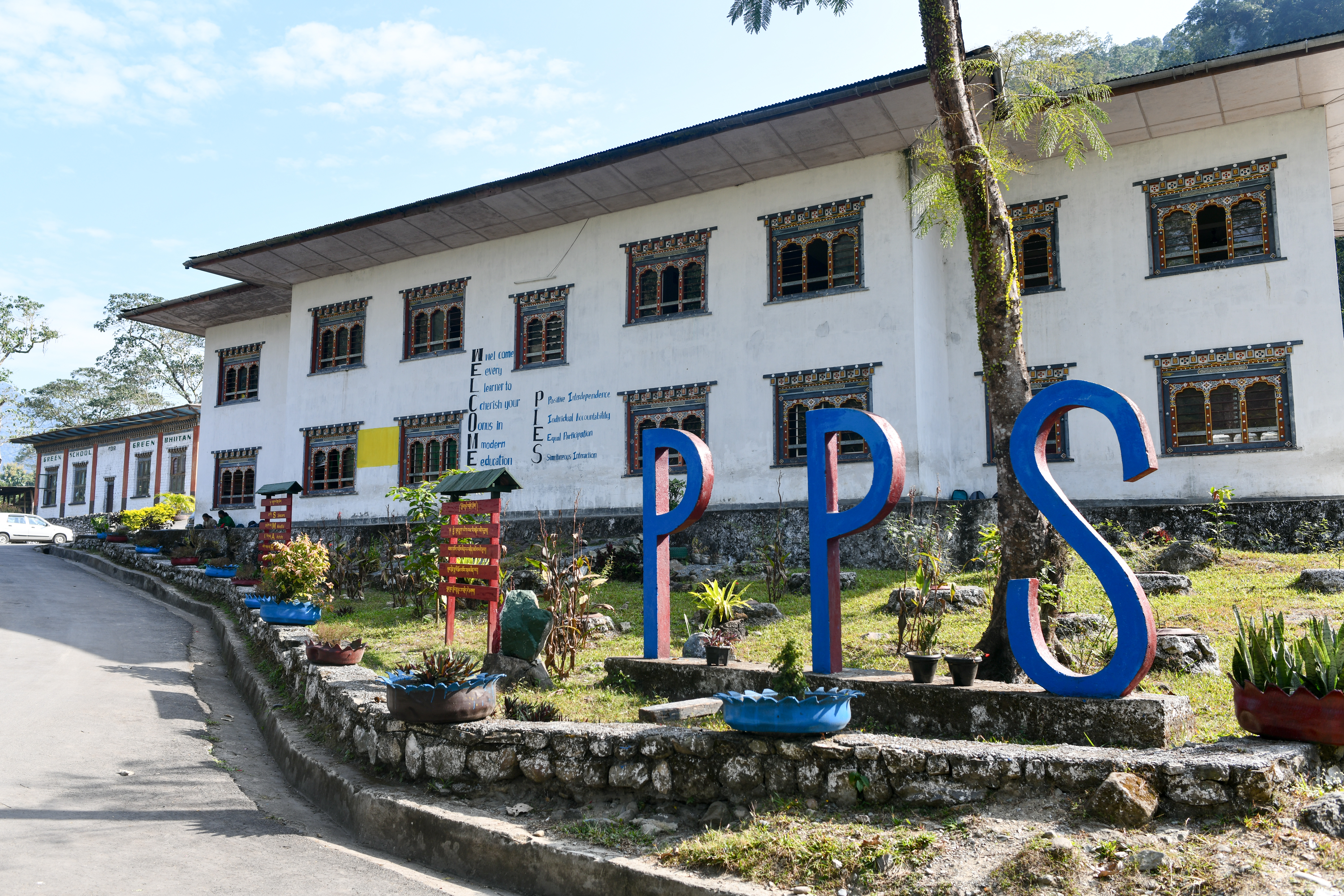
Panbang Primary School in 2019
