= Keiji Nishioka =

Japanese botanist (1933–1992)

Dasho Keiji Nishioka
- 西岡 京治
- Born: 14 February 1933; Keijō, Korea, Empire of Japan
- Died: 21 March 1992 (aged 59); Thimphu, Bhutan
- Education: Naniwa University
- Known for: Modernising Bhutanese agriculture
- Spouse: Satoko Nikai (m. 1959)
- Children: 2
- Awards: Druk Thugsey medal

Dasho Keiji Nishioka (Japanese: 西岡 京治, Nishioka Keiji; 14 February 1933 – 21 March 1992) was a Japanese botanist. He was dispatched to the Kingdom of Bhutan by the Japanese Government to help modernise the Bhutanese agricultural sector. Nishioka worked in Bhutan as an agriculture expert for 28 years, from 1964 till his death in 1992. Nishioka's work helped improve the cultivation of rice and vegetables in Bhutan's Paro and Zhemgang dzongkhags (districts). He also participated in civic infrastructure development efforts in Zhemgang.

== Early life ==
Keiji Nishioka was born to Tatsuzo Nishioka and Toshie Nishioka in Keijō, Korea, Empire of Japan, on 14 February 1933. He was the oldest of four children. In Seoul, then called Keijou, he attended Sakuragaoka Primary School.

The family moved to Osaka, Japan, after the Japanese defeat in the Second World War and the subsequent decolonisation of Korea. In Osaka, Nishioka studied in Yao Junior High School. In 1952, Nishioka entered the Naniwa University to study agriculture. In 1959 he married Satoko Nikai, of Nishinomiya, Hyōgo Prefecture. The couple had two children.

== Life in Bhutan ==
In 1958, Sasuke Nakao, one of Nishioka's professors at the Osaka Prefecture University, went to Bhutan as the first official visitor from Japan. The Prime Minister (Lyonchhen) of Bhutan at the time, Jigme Palden Dorji, asked Nakao for an agricultural expert to help Bhutan modernise its agricultural sector. The lack of developed bilateral relations between Japan and Bhutan at this time prevented any plans from materialising. This problem was solved when Bhutan joined the Colombo Plan in 1962 and thus became entitled to receive aid from other member states in the Plan, which included Japan. On Nakao's recommendation, Nishioka, now an agricultural expert with the Japanese Overseas Technical Cooperation Agency, went to Bhutan in July 1964.

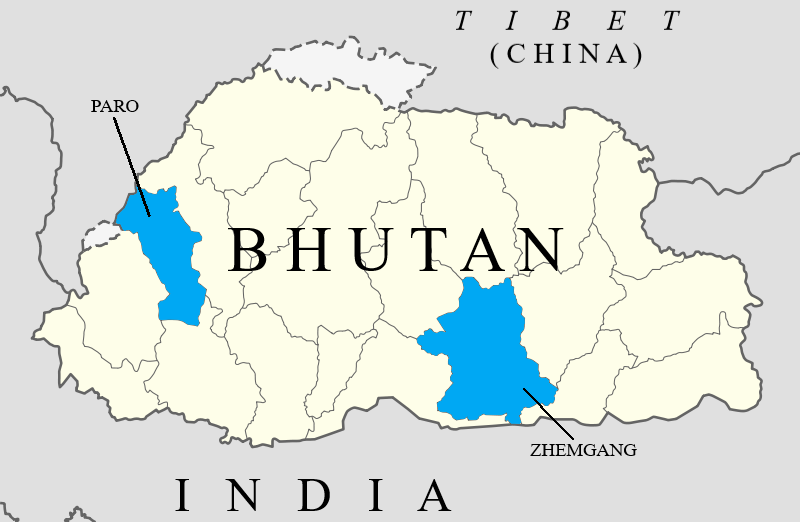
Paro and Zhemgang dzongkhags of Bhutan, where Nishioka worked

=== Paro ===
In 1966, Nishioka, along with three apprentices, established an experimental farm in Bondey in Paro dzongkhag. In this farm, Nishioka grew rice and vegetables such as peas, radishes, pumpkins and cabbages using seeds he had brought from Japan. The farm was successful, growing in size and profitability, even supplying food to guests at the 1974 coronation of the Fourth Druk Gyalpo (King) of Bhutan, Jigme Singye Wangchuck. Nishioka's contributions helped improve paddy cultivation and the use of greenhouses. He also encouraged farmers to sell their food in the open market, including in places outside Paro like Thimphu and Phuntsholing.

=== Zhemgang ===
Nishioka, along with ten apprentices from the Bondey farm, went to Panbang in the Lower Kheng region of Zhemgang dzongkhag in March 1976, as a part of an Integrated Development Project for Zhemgang. The natives of this region mostly practised shifting cultivation in the forests, with no permanent settlements. Nishioka worked to make the region more developed. He ordered the clearing of forests and the settlement of the shifting cultivators in villages in the cleared areas.

The region around the present-day village of Sonamthang in Zhemgang was converted from forest to 146 acres of paddy fields on Nishioka's orders. At the end of Bhutan's Fourth Five-Year Plan, 65 households whose members had contributed to the clearing and cultivation of the region were awarded land there, creating Sonamthang village. Other villages created this way were Thinleygang, Laling, Marangduth, Tunkudema and Pantang. Nishioka also introduced the cultivation of agarwood and cardamom trees for use as cash crops.

Nishioka's efforts led to an increase in the standards of living of people in Zhemgang, reportedly improving communities' self-sufficiency in foodgrains.

Nishioka was active in the field of infrastructure development in Zhemgang. He oversaw the building of 17 suspension bridges and mobilised people's participation in the construction of canals, roads and health clinics.

== Awards and titles ==
For his contributions to Bhutan, Nishioka was conferred the title of Dasho by the Druk Gyalpo, Jigme Singye Wangchuck, in 1980. He was the first foreigner to have received the title Dasho. He was posthumously awarded the Druk Thugsey medal, the highest civilian award in Bhutan, in 1999.

== Death ==
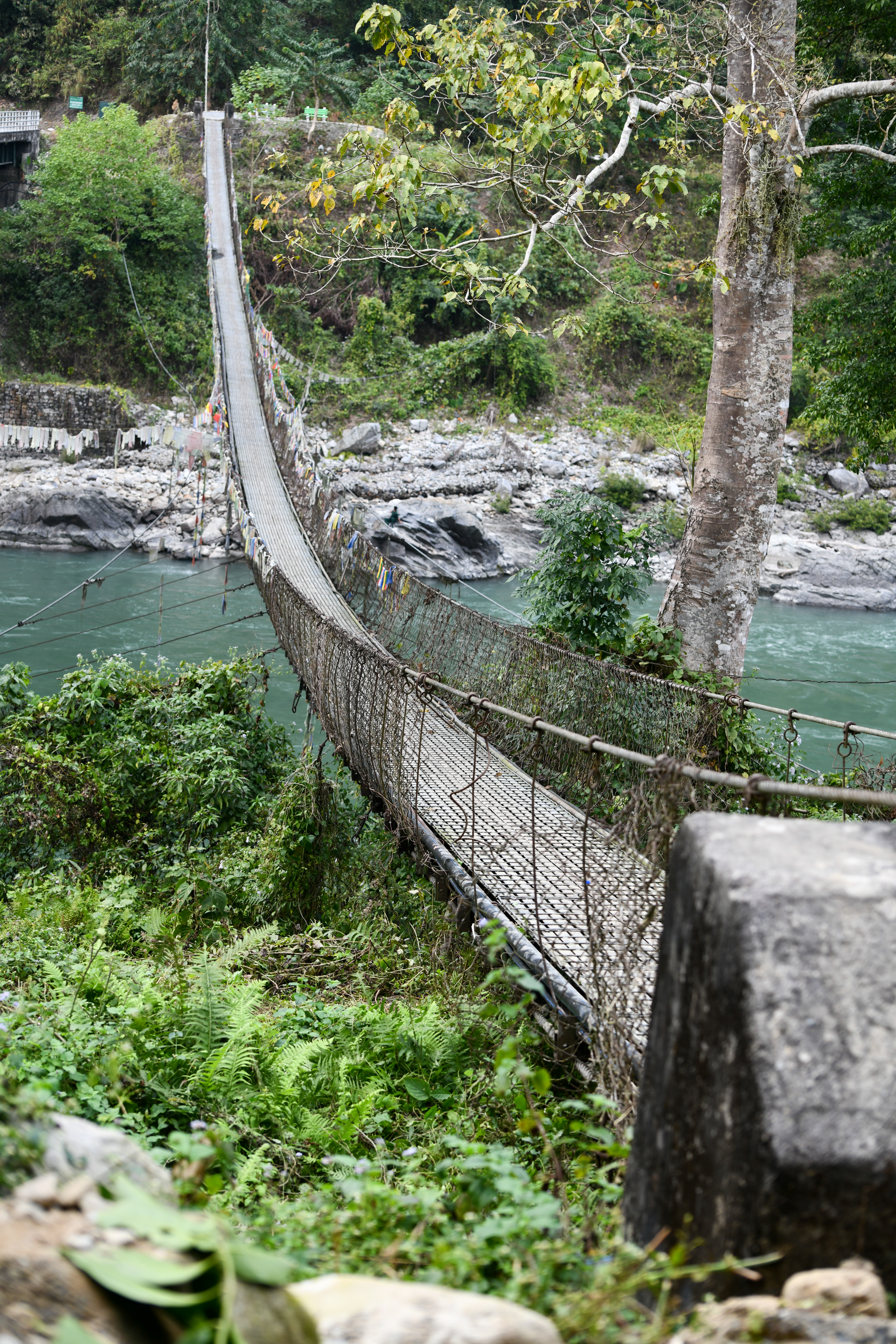
The Nishioka zam in Panbang

Nishioka died on 21 March 1992 in Thimphu, at the age of 59. He was given a state funeral on 26 March.

=== Legacy and commemoration ===
Nishioka is remembered as the 'father of modern agriculture' in Bhutan. In Panbang, he is remembered as 'Japan sahib' among the elderly. A suspension bridge in Panbang—the Nishioka zam—is named after him.

In Paro, a Buddhist stupa called the Dasho Nishioka chorten, is dedicated to Nishioka. In June 2014, on the completion of fifty years' cooperation between Japan and Bhutan, a museum was inaugurated in Paro in Nishioka's memory.
