= Duenmang Tshachu =

Hot spring in Bhutan

Duenmang Tshachu is a hot spring in Bhutan. It is located at the foot of a cliff on Kamjong Hill, on the right bank of the Mangdechhu about 500 meters above sea level in Nangkor Gewog, under Zhemgang Dzongkhag. Since the hot spring is situated in the middle of the Kheng region, it is commonly referred to as the Kheng Tshachu.

The Tshachu is thought to have originated in the village of Kamjong. However, people began throwing trash and even animal carcasses into the Tshachu to keep visitors away. Therefore, the Tshachu is said to have relocated to the present location and came to be known as Duenmang Tshachu.

== Administration ==
The Zhemgang forest division under Nangkor Gewog is in charge of the Tshachu as the hot spring is situated on government reserve forest land. Duenmang Tshachu is one of the ten hot springs in Bhutan. Due to high demand, the hot spring management has added six new ponds to accommodate increasing visitors. The new guesthouse that have 10 rooms is constructed. Each room can accommodate 10 persons. Along the route, steel railings have been added to the foot path from Praling to the Duenmang hot spring, and wire mesh has been installed to cover the precarious path from the bridge to the Tshachu. Now, there is no risk of falling boulders.

== Therapeutic values ==
Duenmang Tshachu is renowned for the "great healing power". There are four pools at Duenmang Tshachu. Pool 1 is said to heal indigestion, phlegm disorders, gout, and feeling of lameness in the limbs. It is also sought after by the people to treat tuberculosis, goiters, joint pain, sinusitis, and skin diseases. Pool 2 heals complicated convulsions, bodily poisons, and chronic fevers. Pool 3 and pool 4 has the same source as Pool 2 and thus has the same medicinal properties.
