= Agriculture in Bhutan =

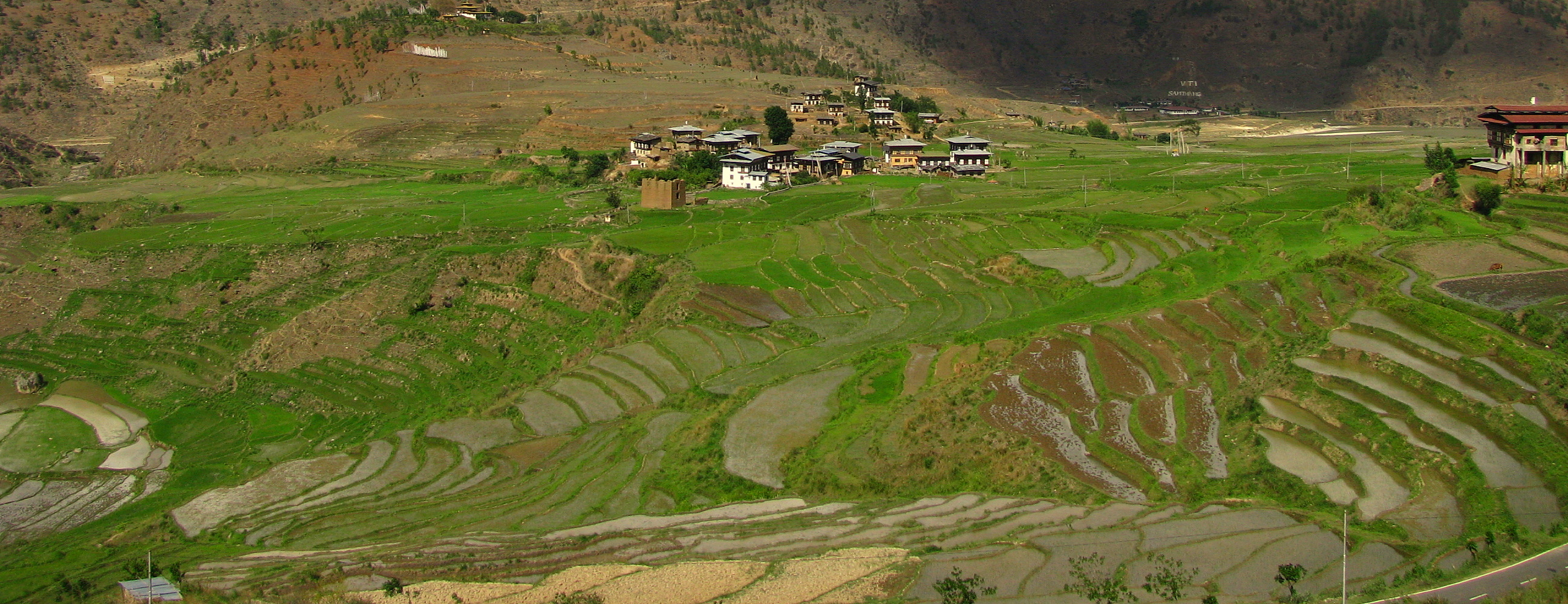
Terraced farmland in Paro.

Agriculture in Bhutan has a dominant role in the Bhutan's economy. In 2000, agriculture accounted for 35.9% of GDP of the nation. The share of the agricultural sector in GDP declined from approximately 55% in 1985 to 33% in 2003. Despite this, agriculture remains the primary source of livelihood for the majority of the population. Pastoralism and farming are naturally complementary modes of subsistence in Bhutan.

Cereals are important component of Bhutanese diet; maize and rice are the major crops cultivated. Other cultivated crops include wheat, barley, oil seeds, potato, and various vegetables. Among vegetables, chili and potato are most important. In addition, cash crops, such as apple, orange, and cardamom are cultivated and exported.

== History ==
Documentary evidence of early agricultural history in Bhutan is scant. However, rituals and events associated in Bhutanese astrology provide cultural evidence to longstanding agrarian practices in the society. The Bhutanese term for agriculture is sonam which can be translated to merit or blessing. Bhutanese people believe that only the fortunate and blessed can be farmers. Some artifacts discovered suggest prevalence of agricultural practices around 1500-2000 BC. It does not provide further insight into the history of crops. The fire that ravaged the former capital of Punakha in 1827 destroyed royal records that could provide other evidence. Despite this, Bhutan's medieval agrarian history can be traced through the biographies of Buddhist saints during the 8-9th century providing some evidence that agriculture was already a mainstay by then. It is quite likely that agricultural practices especially cultivation of rice, maize, and millet reached Bhutan through southern China and Northeast India.

Traditionally, shifting cultivation was an important land use practice. The area cultivated under shifting cultivation was estimated at 32,800 hectares in 1988. With an average fallow period of five years, the total area estimated then was around 200,000 hectares. The practice entailed two distinct systems, bush fallow and grass fallow. Modern agricultural development in Bhutan commenced from the 1960s with the start of planned development programs in the country and is well documented.

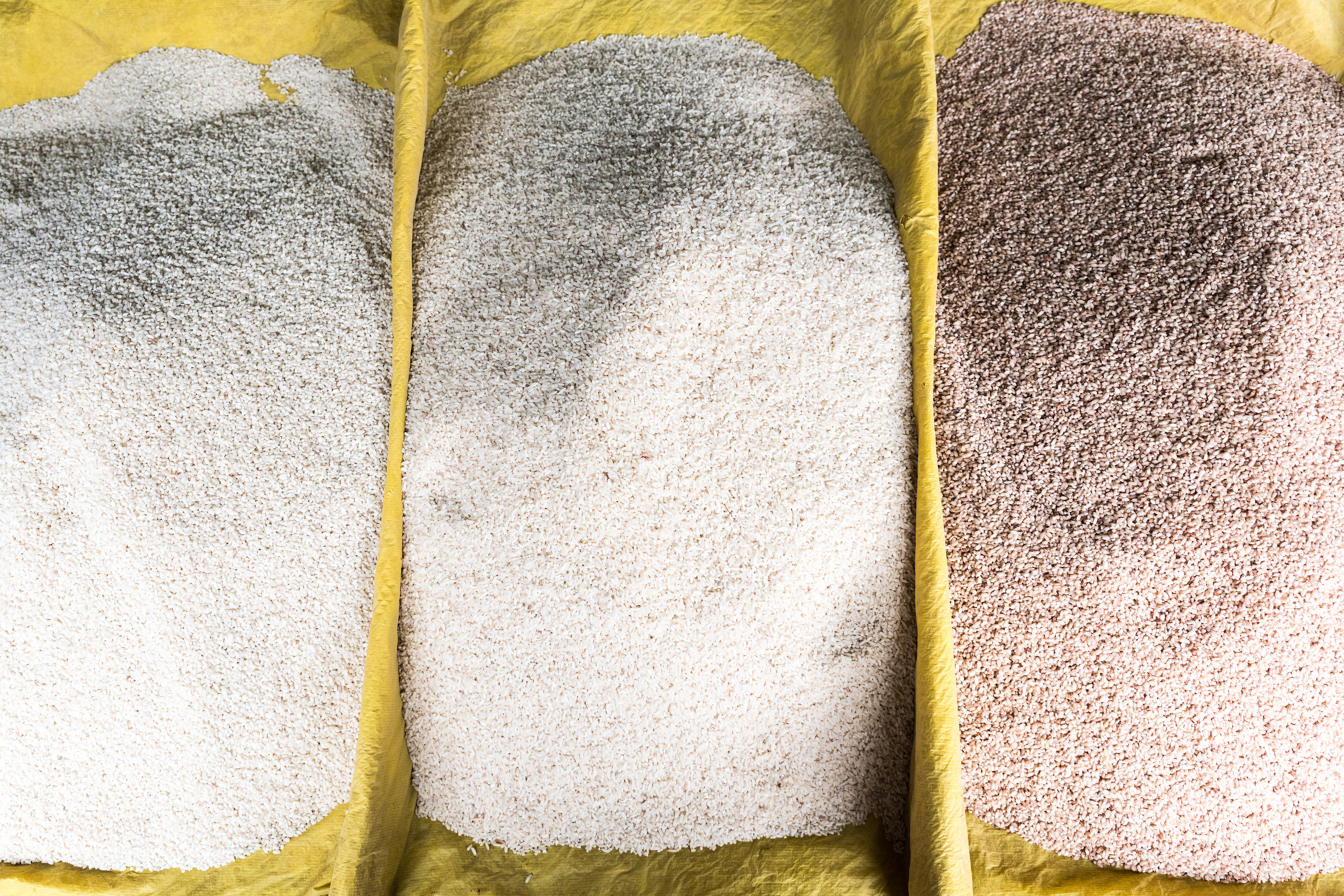
Three varieties of rice in Bhutan.

Bhutan is located at the intersection of the origins of both the subspecies of Oryza sativa (rice), Oryza sativa ssp. japonica and Oryza sativa Indica Group. In conjunction to the traditional rituals associated with rice, it can be viewed as an ancient crop in the kingdom.

=== Modern agriculture ===
In 1961, King Jigme Dorji Wangchuck initiated planned development process. The first Five-Year Plan introduced planned agriculture with a budget of Nu 2,000,000. The entire outlay was financed by the government of India pegged at INR 174,700,000. The kingdom's Department of Agriculture was established on October 1, 1961. It set up a number of model farms, seed multiplication facilities, agricultural research stations, and a network of extension workers. By 1963, research farms were set up at Lungthenphu and Bhur along with a demonstration farm at Tala. In addition, a horticulture research station was built at Yusipang which facilitated orchards at Gasa and Bumthang. Agricultural subsidies for irrigation work started in 1964.

With the second Five-Year Plan between 1967 and 1971, a third research farm was set up at Kanglung to serve eastern Bhutan. Extending the horticulture research, a new research centre was proposed at Bumthang District. Around 40 varieties of paddy were tested to check for geographical suitability of high-yielding varieties. About 49 quintals of improved paddy seeds were distributed during 1969–1970. Agricultural subsidies were expanded to boost rice production in the kingdom.

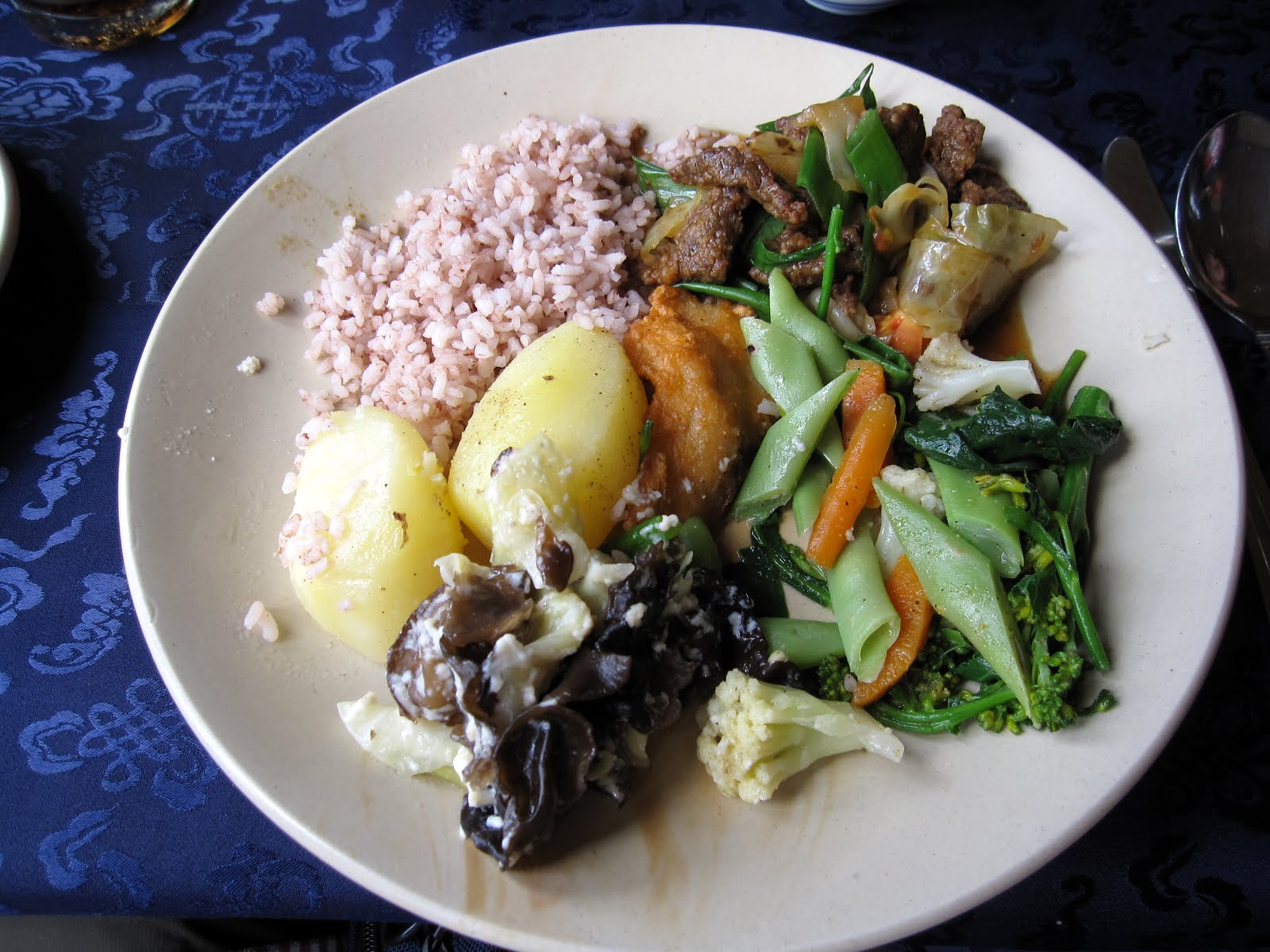
Potato has become a staple to Bhutanese diet.

=== New crops ===
George Bogle seems to have planted potato as he traveled from Buxa Duar through Chapcha Gewog to Thimphu in 1774. After reaching Jaigugu, Bogle reported, "I planted ten potatoes" in an area that must have been about a mile from Pachu–Chinchu (Thimchu) in 1774. He also reports planting 15 potatoes on arrival at Muri-jong (which Turner called Murichom), which was 18 miles from Chukha District. However, it is quite possible that potato may have reached parts of Bhutan earlier, as it was already widely cultivated in northern India. The tuber grew fairly easily and the Bhutanese took an immediate liking to it, so that in 1776 the Dzongpon of Punakha even asked Bogle to send more as they had eaten the whole harvest without saving any seeds. The Dzongpon sent Bhutanese pears to Bogle as a gift. In the early 1980s, three high-yielding, blight resistant potato seeds were released through the Bhutan National Potato Programme. In 2001, potato cultivation had increased to 35,436 metric tonnes of which 24,000 metric tonnes was exported. Today, potato is grown in all Dzongkhags of Bhutan; although widely consumed locally, most of the crop is grown for the export market. Potatoes are produced by many farmers, from small landholders to tenant and large farmers, by high-altitude yak herders, and by farmers of the sub-tropics.

== Economy ==
Approximately 80% of the population of Bhutan are involved in agriculture. According to the National Accounts Statistics 2017, the agriculture sector was the highest contributor to the national economy with 16.52%, followed by construction industry and hydropower at 16.28% and 13.38%, respectively.

=== Land-use ===
The country's total geographical size is 38,394 km, of which cultivable land accounts for just 2.93%. Terraced rice cultivation is commonly referred to as wetland farming, which constitutes 27.86% of the country's cultivable land.

Dzongkhag-wise agricultural Land Holdings and Land Types, 2010 (hectares)
Dzongkhag	Wetland	Dry land	Apple Orchard	Citrus Orchard	Arecanut Plantation	Cardamom Plantation	Other Horticulture
Bumthang District	24.7	2883.8	12.0	0	0	0	0
Chukha District	1799.2	5119.2	53.0	1308.0	180.0	782.0	0
Dagana District	1492.8	4588.4	0	1341.0	115.0	0	0
Gasa District	143.6	386.3	0	0	0	0	0
Haa District	88.5	2067.8	89.0	9.0	0	527.0	0
Lhuntse District	1575.6	4328.7	0	1.0	0	0	0
Mongar District	431.7	5304.4	0	3.0	0	0	0
Paro District	1753.0	3561.6	1026.0	0	0	0	0
Pemagatshel District	302.3	4333.4	0	620.0	0	0	0
Punakha District	5074.3	262.0	0	1.0	0	0	16.0
Samdrup Jongkhar District	1147.7	6732.4	0	232.0	17.0	0	0
Samtse District	5682.4	8150.5	0	894.0	348.0	2291.0	0
Sarpang District	2087.6	3472.7	0	553.0	540.0	0	0
Thimphu District	458.3	913.6	902.0	0	0	0	0
Trashigang District	1448.5	4974.4	0	0	0	0	0
Trashiyangtse District	949.3	2110.6	0	0	0	0	0
Trongsa District	1082.3	1204.9	0	0	0	0	0
Tsirang District	1527.1	2867.4	0	314.0	0	0	0
Wangdue Phodrang District	4202.3	1742.0	0	0	0	0	0
Zhemgang District	639.6	3250.7	0	211.0	0	0	0
Bhutan	31910.8	68254.8	2082.0	5487.0	1200.0	3600.0	16.0

=== Workforce ===
Over 95% of the earning women in the country work in the agricultural sector. Majority of rural Bhutanese population in this Himalayan nation are also employed in the agricultural sector. Agriculture in Bhutan is characterized by its labor-intensive nature with relatively low intensity of farm inputs. Most of the peasants in the country are small and marginal.

== Production ==
=== Cultivation practices ===
Shifting cultivation in Bhutan has two distinct production systems: grass-fallow and bush-fallow. These systems are well adapted to prevailing climatic conditions and have been self-sustaining for generations.

The grass fallow system, locally known as pangshing, is practised at elevations ranging from 2500-400m above sea level. The areas that practice pangshing range from 2500m to 4000m above sea level with a temperate climate. Bumthang District is the single most important district accounting for more than 40% of the total registered area under this practice. Soil in these areas is generally derived from coarse grained granite gneiss and is poor in phosphate while being rich in potassium.

The bush-fallow system, locally known as tseri, is practised in the subtropical regions of the country. Tseri cultivation was concentrated along the foothills of Samdrup Jongkhar, Chukha, Samtse, Pemagatshel, and Zhemgang districts and in some parts of Trashigang, Mongar, Lhuntse, and Trashiyangtse districts. The climate in these areas is wet to dry subtropical with annual rainfall ranging from 4000mm in Samdrup Jongkhar to less than 1000mm in rainshadowed areas of Trashigang and Mongar districts. Many areas of tseri cultivation are very steep and remote.

Increasing population pressure, new rules and regulation limiting access to land, higher economic expectations, rising labour costs, and gradual change from sustenance farming to market-oriented cultivation are viewed as reasons for changing agrarian practices in the country. The Royal Government of Bhutan had decided that tseri cultivation should be phased out by the end of 1997, i.e. the final year of Bhutan's seventh five year plan.

=== Crops ===
Major crops cultivated in Bhutan are maize and rice. Maize accounts for 49% of total domestic cereal cultivation, and rice accounts for 43%. Rice is the major staple crop. Agriculture in the country includes cultivation of wheat and other minor cereal crops. Paddy is the primary crop in those regions where proper irrigation is available. Apart from paddy, other crops like wheat, barley, oil seeds, potato and different vegetables are also cultivated in these lands. Maize is mainly cultivated in dryland regions at lower elevation. Forests in the nation act as the source of livestock fodder and organic materials for the purpose of development of fertility. Forests are also responsible for regulating the availability of water for agricultural purpose.

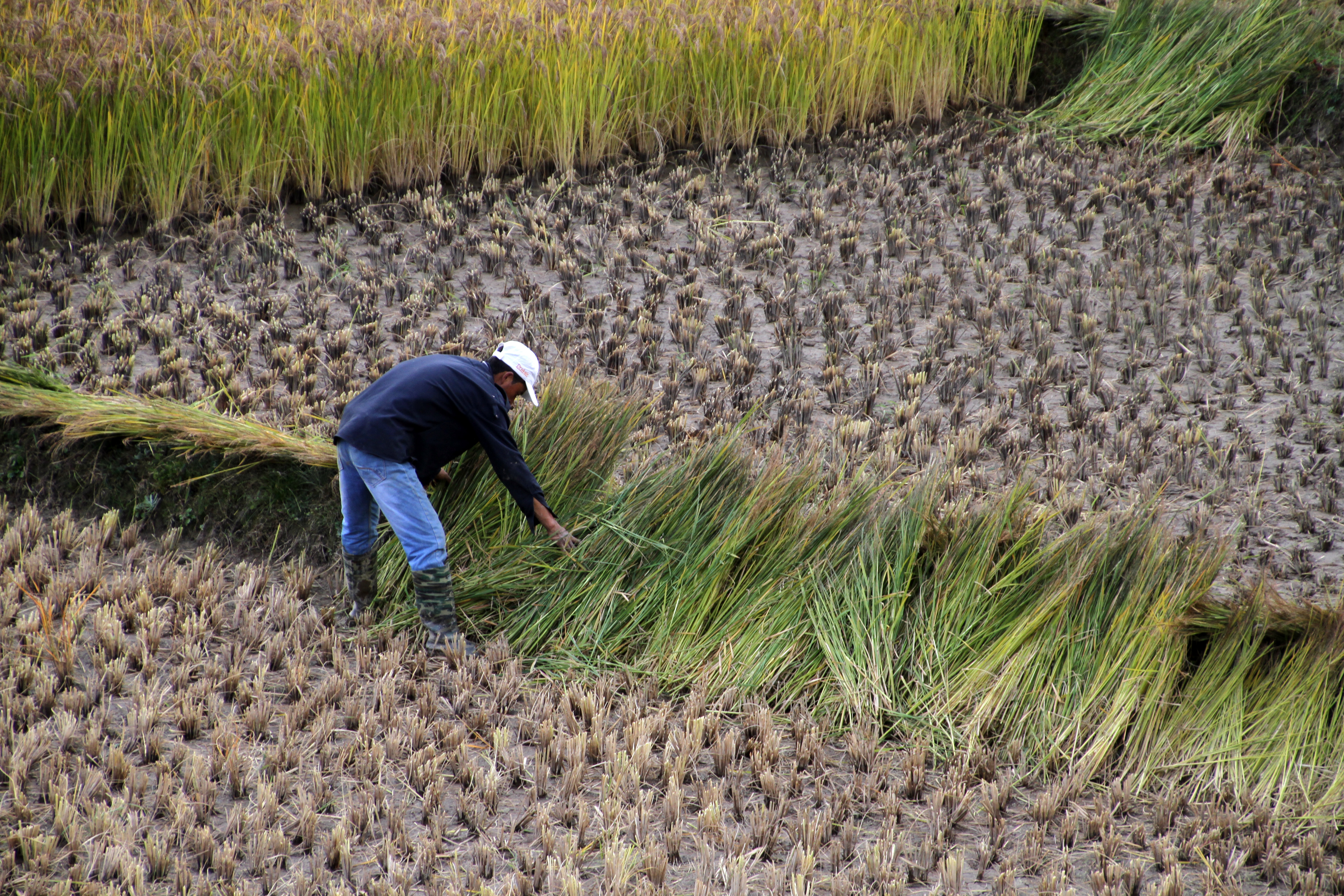
Harvesting rice in Bumthang district

The primary goals of agriculture in Bhutan are to raise the per capita income of the people living in rural areas, to enhance self-sufficiency in staple crops, and to increase the productivity per unit of farm labor and agricultural land. Agriculture is hampered due to irrigation problem, rough terrain, poor soil quality and limited number of arable lands. But several other factors have contributed in the development of agriculture. These factors include improved quality of various cereal seeds, oil seeds, and vegetable seeds, use of fertilizers, mechanization process and trained agricultural experts. The agricultural sector have experienced development especially in the following projects:

- Paro Valley Development Project
- Geylegphug Development Project
- Punakha-Wangdi Valley Development Project
- Trashigang-Mongar Area Development Project
- Chirang Hill Irrigation Development Project.

Production of cash crops, such as apple, orange and cardamom, have increased and have become profitable. In several areas the shifting cultivation is being replaced by the orchard cultivation. Academics expect this will increase the cultivation of cash crops.

In 2013 the government announced that Bhutan will become the first country in the world with 100 percent organic farming and started a program for qualification. This program is being supported by the International Federation of Organic Agriculture Movements (IFOAM).

== Climate change ==
Rice is known to require more water than any other crop. It is the most vulnerable and highly dependent on climatic parameters, such as monsoon rains and temperature. In Bhutan, rice is grown under irrigated, rain-fed, and upland ecosystems. In the uplands where water scarcity is increasingly affecting farm output, farmers are switching back to traditional rice varieties known in the local language as Yangkum, Jama, Janaap, and Jakaap. These grow well in high altitude and require short window for plantation and harvesting.

== See also ==
- Rice production in Bhutan
- Keiji Nishioka
