= Fishing in Bhutan =

A significant food source in Bhutan is fishing, both from cold-water streams and lakes (primarily trout) and warm-water fisheries (primarily carp).

== Fishing industry ==
A growing demand for fish as a dietary supplement was reported in the mid-1970s following a 1974 FAO aquaculture study and a 1976 FAO survey of rivers and lakes to determine the level of fish stock. Fisheries were developed, and carp were imported from Assam. In 1977 the Department of Animal Husbandry established a Fishery Development Program, initially for stocking rivers with game fish and for developing commercial capability as a long-term goal.

Between 1979 and 1987, an average of 1,000 tons of fish were caught or produced annually. Another FAO survey was conducted in 1981, and the government included fishery development for the first time in the Fifth Development Plan.

The Integrated Fisheries Development Project was started at Geylegphug in 1985. The National Warm Water Fish Culture Centre supplied fish to farmers, and some twenty-one tons of carp were produced at fisheries for local and national consumption. To control cold-water fishing, the Department of Forestry issued fishing licenses and enforced seasonal and fishsize prohibitions.

== See also ==
- Agriculture in Bhutan
