= Trong =

Trong can refer to:

- Terong, a village in Malaysia
- Trong (state constituency), a region of Malaysia
- Trong Gewog, a region of Bhutan
- Stephanie Trong (born 1976), an American magazine editor
