= Bardo Gewog =

Coordinates: 27.073°N 90.991°E

Bardo Gewog བར་རྡོ་
- Gewog
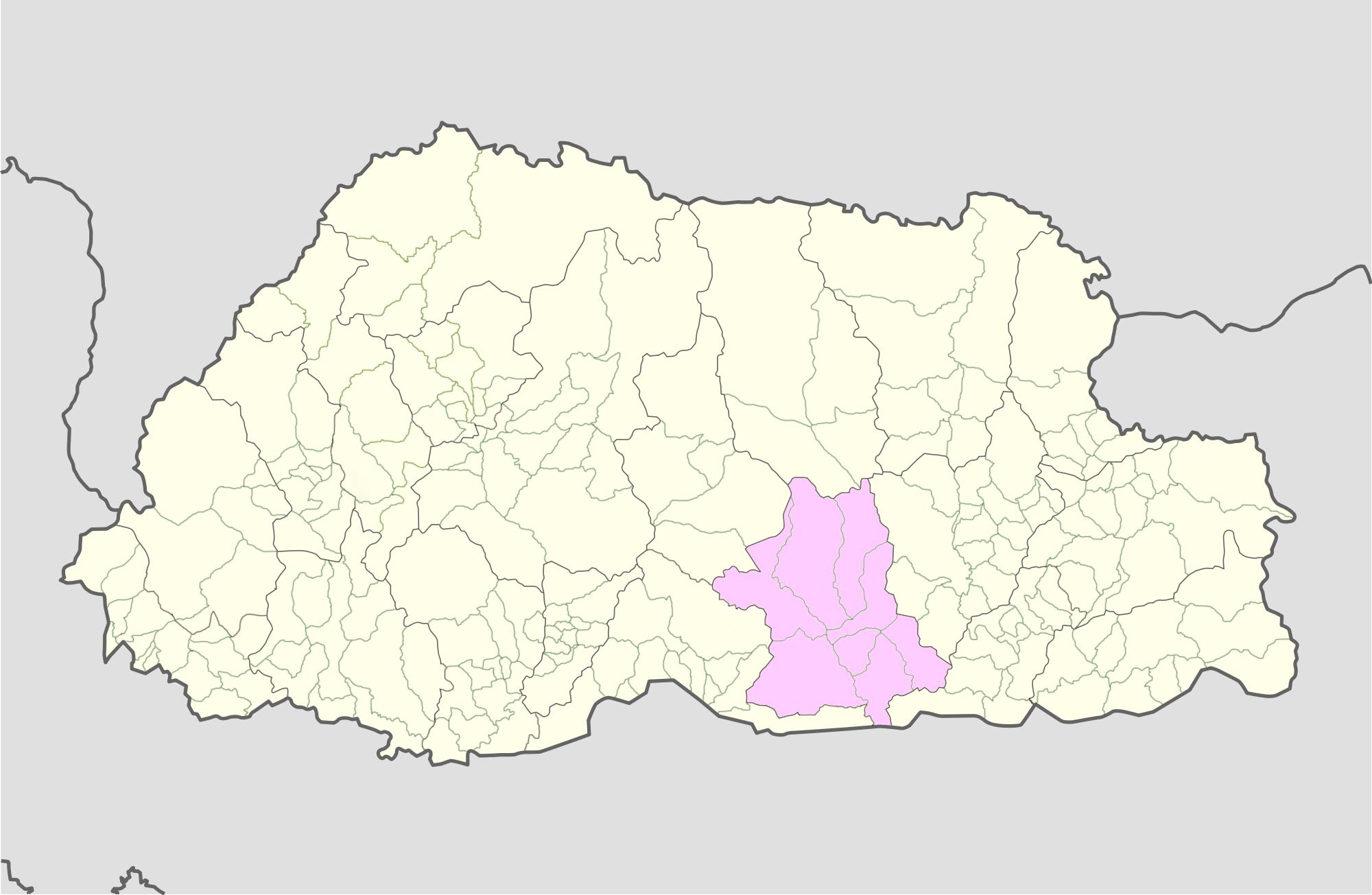
- Country: Bhutan
- District: Zhemgang District
- Time zone: UTC+6 (BTT)

Bardo Gewog (Dzongkha: བར་རྡོ་) is a gewog (village block) of Zhemgang District, Bhutan.
