= Phangkhar Gewog =

Coordinates: 26°54′1″N 90°42′36″E

Phangkhar Gewog ཕང་མཁར་
- Gewog
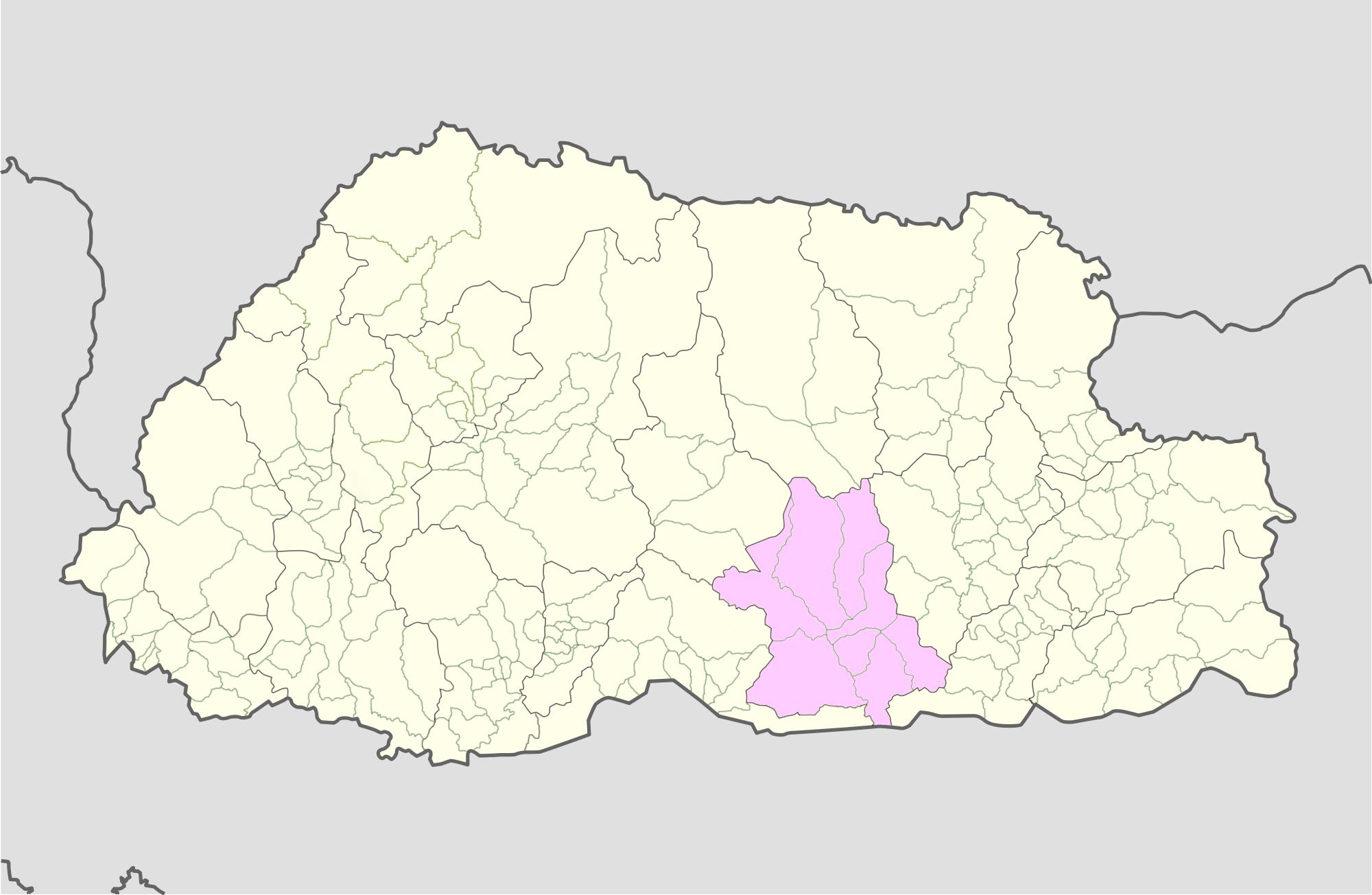
- Country: Bhutan
- District: Zhemgang District
- Time zone: UTC+6 (BTT)

Phangkhar Gewog (Dzongkha: ཕང་མཁར་) is a gewog (village block) of Zhemgang District, Bhutan. Phangkhar Gewog is also a part of Panbang Dungkhag (sub-district), along with Goshing, Ngangla, and Bjoka Gewogs.
