= Bhutan–Japan relations =

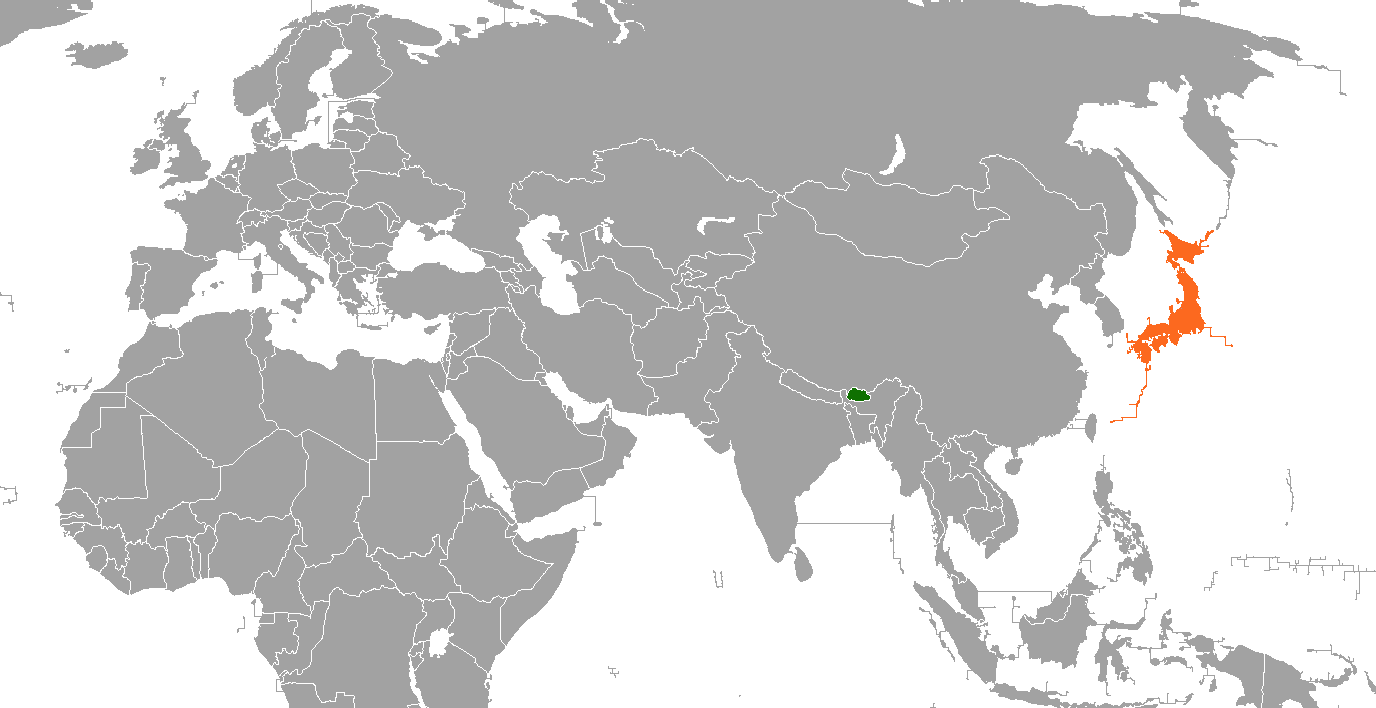
- Bhutan: Japan

The Bhutan–Japan relations refers to the diplomatic relations between Bhutan and Japan. Diplomatic relations were established on March 28, 1986.

== Diplomatic mission ==
Japan has a non-resident embassy to Bhutan in New Delhi, India. Japan was planning to open a resident embassy in Thimphu by April 2014. One of the factors for opening a resident embassy in Bhutan is to counter China's influence in the region; however, budgetary constraints served as an obstacle to the plan. As of 2026, the ambassador to Bhutan is still resident at Embassy of Japan in India.

== State Visit ==
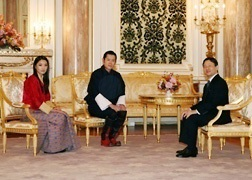
Bhutanese King (center), Queen (left) and Japanese Crown Prince, current Emperor, at Tokyo Imperial Palace on November 16, 2011.

Bhutanese monarch, Druk Gyalpo Jigme Khesar Namgyal Wangchuck and his wife Queen Jetsun Pema made a state visit to Japan from November 15–20 in 2011.

As for Japanese imperial family's visit to Bhutan, the first one was in March 1987 by Prince Naruhito, current Emperor Naruhito, the second one was in March 1997 by Prince and Princess Akishino, and the third one is in June 2017 by Princess Mako.

== Disaster relief ==
Bhutan received aid from Japan regarding its disaster relief against glacial lake outburst floods. Director of the Department of Hydro-Met Services in Bhutan's Ministry of Economic Affairs, Karma Tsering, said that Bhutan is receiving assistance from the Japan International Cooperation Agency in developing a cheaper and more efficient early warning system to minimize losses and damages from sudden glacial lake outburst floods. The Japanese government is also coming up with a glacier lake inventory and has been conducting geological studies in the Himalayas. The Japanese agency plans to complete its project in Bhutan by 2016.

== Tourism ==
Japan has a growing market for Bhutan's tourism. In early 2012, Phuntsho Gyeltshen, the officiating media focal person of the Tourism Council of Bhutan noted that the number of Japanese tourists who visited increased significantly and Japan is close to becoming the number one market of Bhutan's tourism. The official also noted that the drastic increase of Japanese tourists to Bhutan happened especially after King Jigme Khesar Namgyal Wangchuck and Queen Jetsun Pema made a visit to the country. In 2011, 7,000 Japanese visited Bhutan. Japan was the second biggest market for Bhutan's tourism.

== See also ==
- Foreign relations of Bhutan
- Foreign relations of Japan
- Keiji Nishioka
