= Shingkhar Gewog =

Shingkhar Gewog ཤིང་མཁར་
- Gewog
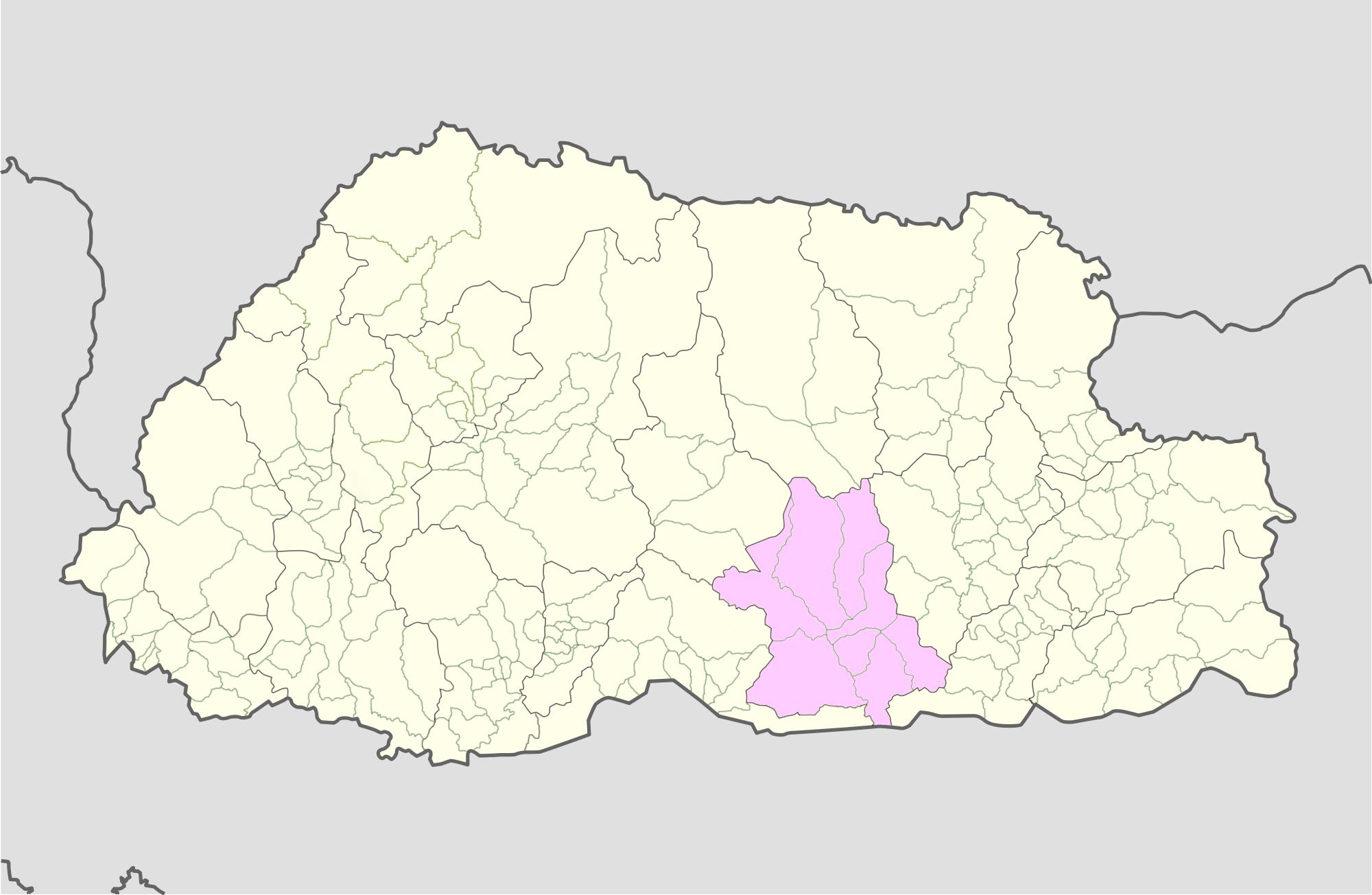
- Country: Bhutan
- District: Zhemgang District
- Time zone: UTC+6 (BTT)

Shingkhar Gewog (Dzongkha: ཤིང་མཁར་) is a gewog (village block) of Zhemgang District, Bhutan.
