= Goshing Gewog =

Goshing Gewog སྒོ་ཤིང་
- Gewog
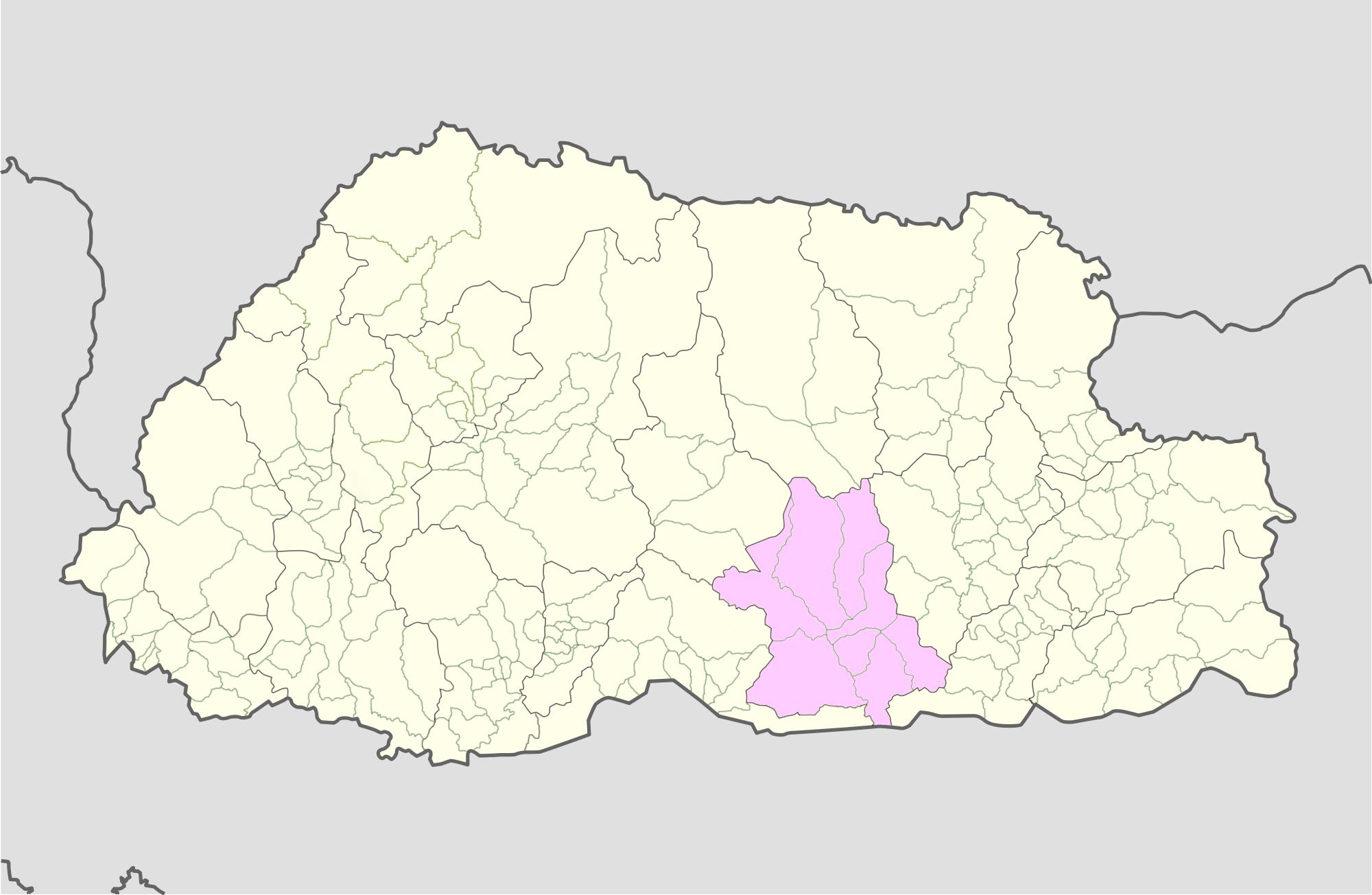
- Country: Bhutan
- District: Zhemgang District
- Time zone: UTC+6 (BTT)

Goshing Gewog (Dzongkha: སྒོ་ཤིང་) is a gewog (village block) of Zhemgang District, Bhutan. Goshing Gewog is also a part of Panbang Dungkhag (sub-district), along with Bjoka, Ngangla, and Phangkhar Gewogs.
