= List of hot springs and mineral springs of Bhutan =

== Background ==
In Bhutan, hot spring is locally known as Tshachu and the medicinal or mineral spring water as Menchu. There is another kind of water known as Drupchhu (holy spring water). Spiritually, it is believed that tshachu, drubchu and smenchu owe their origin to the good wishes and blessings of Buddhas and Boddhisattavas. Hence, most of these types of water are found in the areas of gNyes (sacred sites). Tshachu is the most popular one among the Bhutanese. In some countries, hot springs are commonly used for recreation and relaxation; in Bhutan hot spring soaking is mainly used for balenotheraputic purposes as a therapy for treating diseases.

Mindful of the health benefits that tshachu deliver to the Bhutanese people, the Institute of Traditional Medicine Services documented and classified the tshachu according to the therapeutic properties described in the ancient gSo-ba Rig-pa textbook. According to this textbook, tshachu contain a combination of rdo-sol (coal), mu-zi (sulphur) and rdo-sho (limestone). Because of the presence of these minerals most of the tshachu have medicinal value. In 2007, Wangchuk and Dorji first reported on the history and spiritual benefits of tshachus in Bhutan and also provided a list of popular tshachus. In 2011, Wangchuk gave detailed explanation and description of different types of tshachu, drubchu and smenchu in his book chapter on 'An Indigenous Panacea of Bhutan' written for the Intangible Cultural Heritage of Bhutan, Paro Museum. In 2014, Wangdi and Wangdi described a list of tshachus and drubchus, which are provided below.

Two oral traditions of Bhutan are associated with the thermal springs of Gasa Tsachu. There is a belief from the c. 13th century that Drupthop Terkhungpa "scattered 128 varieties of medicines in Gasa, from which 128 hot springs and mineral springs were formed. Another belief is that Zhapdrung Ngakwang Namgyel (1594–1651) arrived in Gasa, he visited the hot springs which relieved his fatigue and joint pain. Dendup Norzang is the local deity of Gasa Tsachu; originally a "wrathful demon" he later became a "peaceful dharma protector.

It is free of charge to visit the hot springs of Bhutan, however any spa-type treatments, or facilities at hotels near the springs are not.

== Hot springs ==
- Chuboog Tshachu (Punakha)
- Koma Tshachu (Punakha)
- Gasa Tsachu (Gasa)
- Wachey Tsachu
- Gayza Tshachu (Gasa)
- Dhur Tshachu (Bumthang)
- Duenmang Tshachu (Zhemgang)
- Gelephu Tshachu (Sarpang)
- Khambalung gNey Tshachu (Lhuntse)
- Yoenten KuenjungTshachu (Lhuntse)
- Pasalum Tshachu (Lhuentse)

== Mineral springs ==
- Bjagay Menchu (Paro)
- Dobji Menchu (Paro)
- Bjagay, Tokay, Mage-Phenday, Loyee Menchu (Gasa)
- Kabisa Menchu (Punakha)
- Dangchu Wangchu (Wangdue Phodrang)
- Ura Dangchu (Bumthang)
- Dangkhar Menchu (Zhemgang)
- Aja gNey Menchu (Mongar)
- Bharab Menchu and Chethag Menchu (Lhuentse)
- Menchugang Pho-mo Menchu (Lhuentse)
- Dhonphangma Menchu (Trashigang)
- Khabtey Menchu (Trashigang)
- Tokey Menchu (Gasa)
- Khowabokto Menchu (Phobjikha Valley)
- Gela Menchu (Phobjikha Valley)
- Zeeba Menchu (Phobjikha Valley)
- Pisting Menchu (Phobjikha Valley)
- Khasa Menchu (Phobjikha Valley)
- Dungchen Menchu (Dagana District)
- Gewo Menchu
- Menchu Karp (Thimphu)
- Korphu Menchu (Trongsa)
- Zami Menchu (Gasa)
- Menchu Karp (Gasa)
- Ake Menchu (Gasa)
- Yame Menchu (Gasa)
- Bakey Menchu (Gasa)
- Rekayzam Menchu (Wangdue Phodrang)

== Holy springs ==
- Bartsham Drupchhu (Trashigang)
- Dechenphug Drupchhu (Thimphu)
- Dhobdrek Drupchhu (Paro)
- Dhodhey Drak Drupchhu (Thimphu)
- Drubthob Ngagi Rinchen Drupchhu (Punakha)
- Jomorichu Drupchhu (Trashigang)
- Kurje Drupchhu (Bumthang)
- Taktsang Drupchhu (Paro)
- Tango Drupchhu (Thimphu)
- Thuji Drak Drupchhu (Thimphu)
- Tsheringma Drupchhu (Trongsa)

== See also ==
- Bhutan
- Protected areas of Bhutan
