= Tingtibi =

Coordinates: 27.15°N 90.68°E

Tingtibi is a settlement in the south of Bhutan. It is located in Zhemgang District, to the south of the town of Zhemgang. The population was 675 at the 2005 census, and in 2008 is estimated at 706.
