= Rice production in Bhutan =

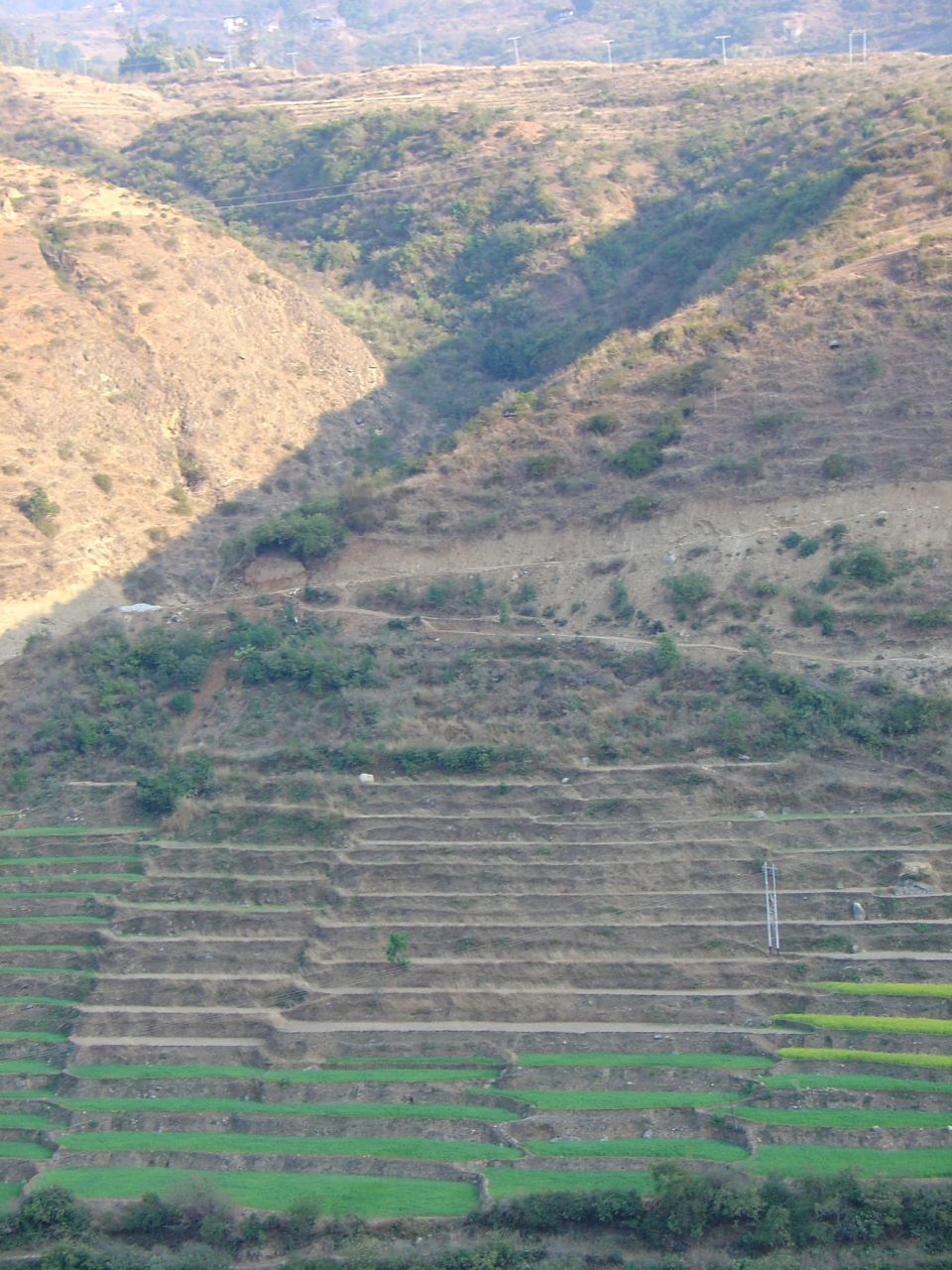
Rice terraces in Bhutan.

Rice production in Bhutan plays an important role in food supply in Bhutan. It is cultivated largely for domestic consumption. In 2001, it was reported as little as 1% of rice grown in Bhutan as being marketed, but a farmers survey indicated that around 15% is indeed marketed.

In a country where 79% of the population is engaged in agriculture, in 2006 the production of rice in Bhutan was 74,720 metric tons, with some 67,568 acres (273.44 km^{2}) under cultivation. This increased dramatically from 44,000 tons in 2000. Rice production in Bhutan increased by 58 percent between 1989 and 1997 according to an assessment of the rice research programme in Bhutan.

The most important growing areas are Samtse which has the highest rice growing area in Bhutan with 2,889 hectares, followed by Sarpang with 2,839 and Punakha with 1,971 hectares. Production is highest in Punakha with 6,274 tonnes a year. Other areas include Paro and Wangduephodrang, which has one of the most important rice institutes in the country at Bajo.

A significant percentage of agricultural land has been destroyed to make way for infrastructure in the country. According to Ganesh B. Chettri, the Joint Director of the Department of Agriculture, “We have lost a lot of land for infrastructural development purposes in Thimphu and other places but still the rice produced in Bhutan is sufficient for 50 percent of the population”.

Whilst Bhutan is notable grower of rice, Bhutan imports 70,000 to 80,000 metric tonnes of rice every year according to Singay Dukpa, the Deputy Managing Director of the Foodgrain Division of the Food Corporation of Bhutan. In 2020, rice was the third most imported commodity costing Nu 2.63 billion.

In 2018, it was reported that sustained decline in land under rice cultivation has resulted in a loss of more than 31,300 metric tonnes in the last two decades. While 28,000 hectares of land was under rice in 1981, this figure reduced to 20,547 in 2017. This figure translates into rice that could have fed one-fifth of the country's population for a year.

== Products ==
=== Bhutanese red rice ===
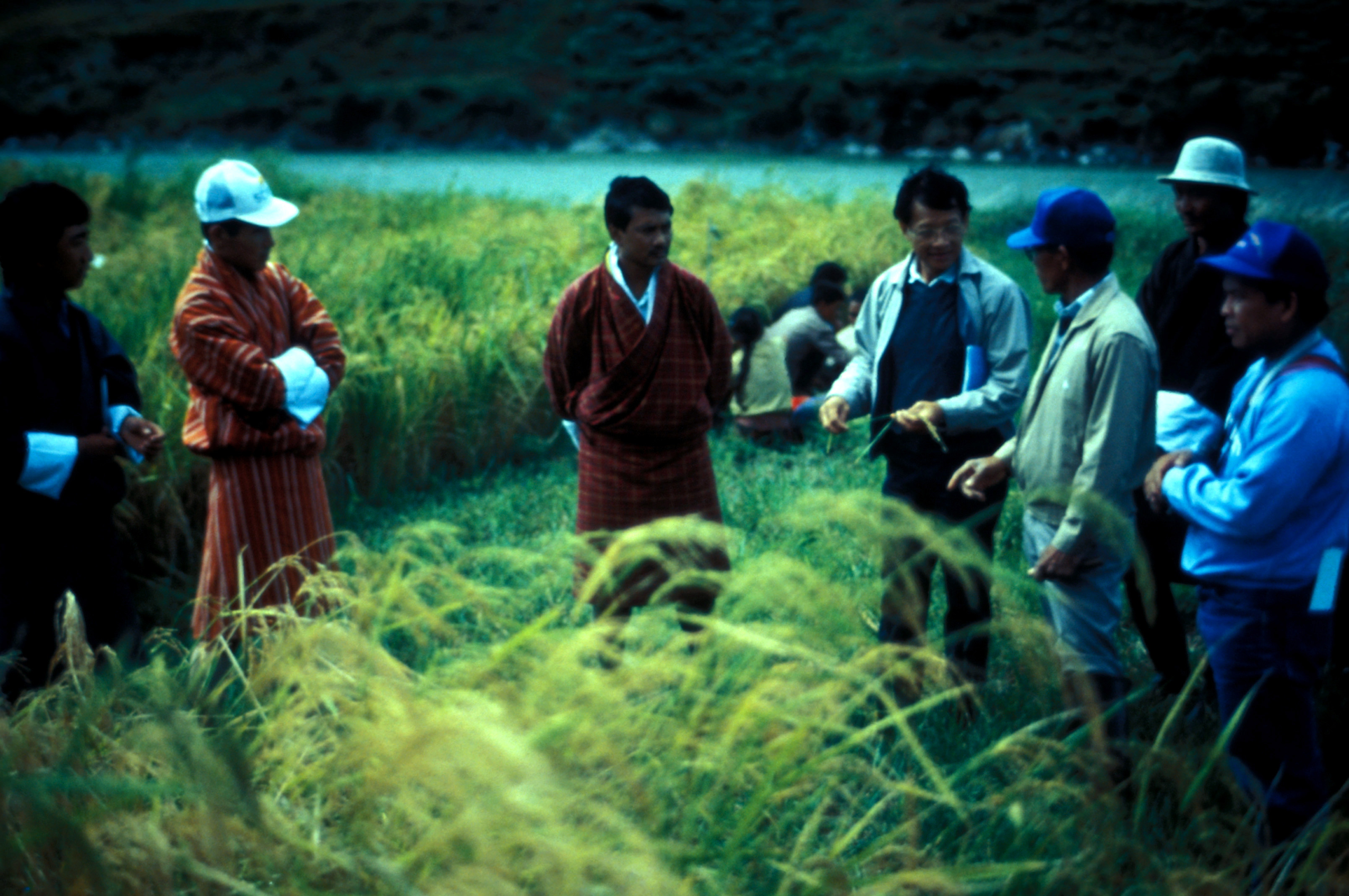
Agricultural officials and rice cultivators.

Bhutanese red rice is a medium-grain rice, and is the staple rice of the Bhutanese people. It is a red japonica rice that is semi-milled; some of the reddish bran is left on the rice. Because of this, it cooks somewhat faster than an unmilled brown rice. When cooked, the rice is pale pink, soft and slightly sticky.

This rice became available in the United States in the mid-1990s.

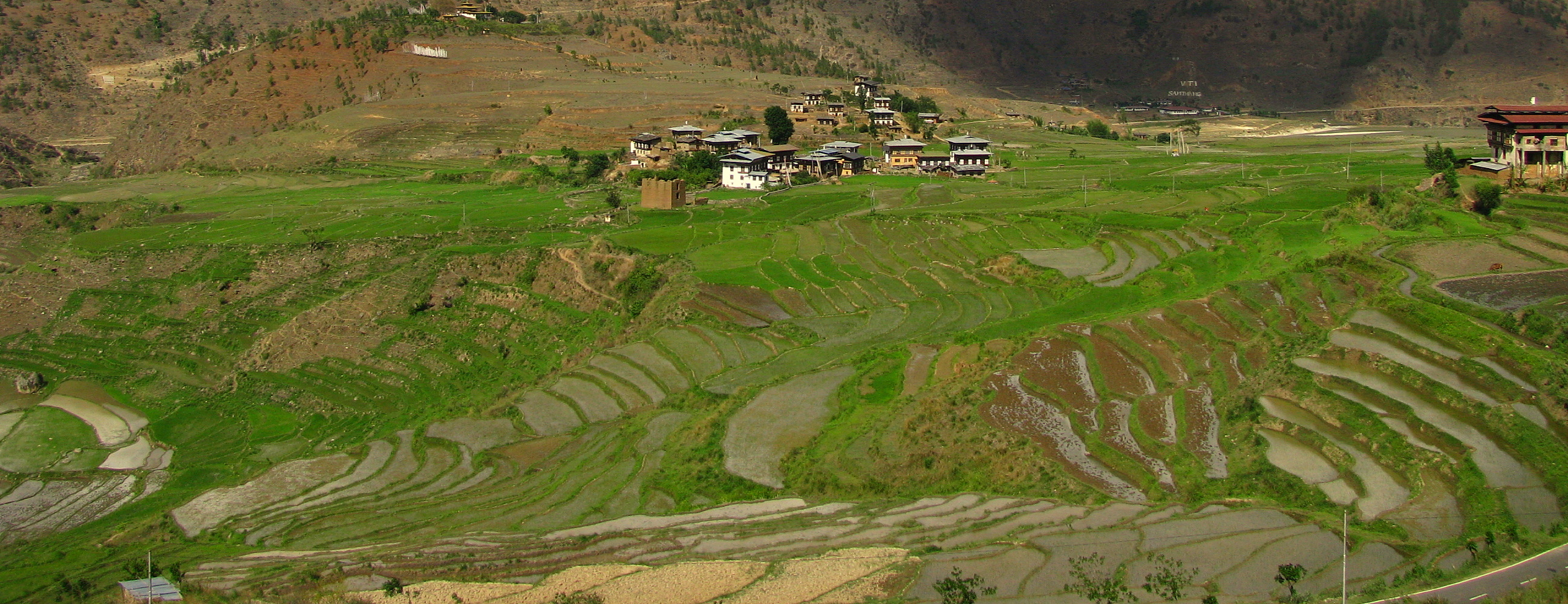

== Climate Change ==
In the uplands where water scarcity is increasingly affecting farm output, farmers are switching back to traditional rice varieties known in the local language as Yangkum, Jama, Janaap, and Jakaap. These grow well in high altitude and require short window for plantation and harvesting.

== See also ==
- Agriculture in Bhutan
