= Trong Gewog =

Trong Gewog ཀྲོང་
- Gewog
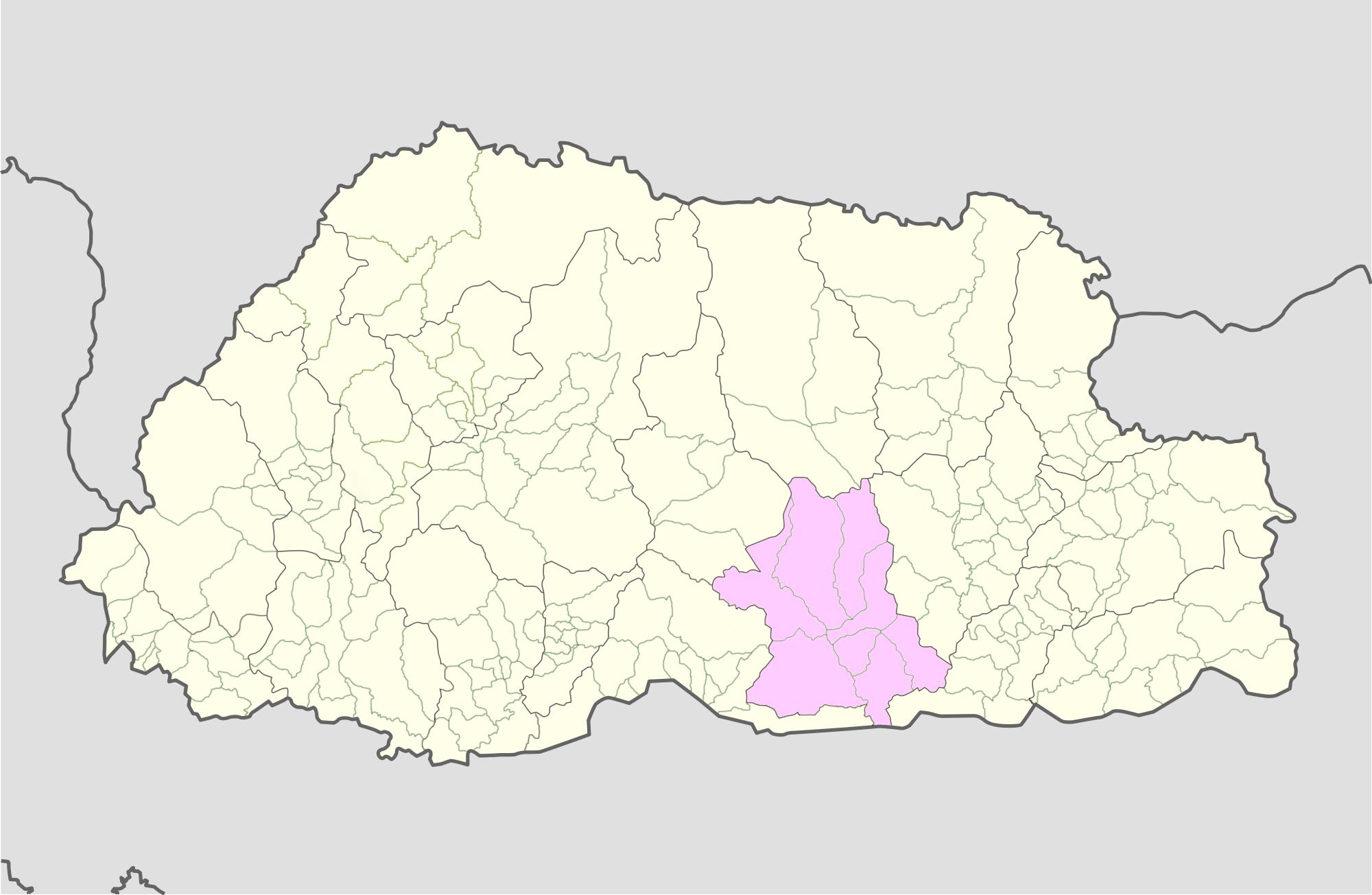
- Country: Bhutan
- District: Zhemgang District
- Time zone: UTC+6 (BTT)

Trong Gewog (Dzongkha: ཀྲོང་) is a gewog (village block) of Zhemgang District, Bhutan. It has a total area of 358 km^{2} and a total population of 3371. In 2003, The Dzongkhag administration declared Trong a “heritage village,” whereby house-owners were restricted from changing the appearance of their houses and surroundings. This was done to encourage the preservation of traditional Bhutanese architecture and increase culture-based tourism in the region. As of 2023, there were 380 households in this gewog, and 39 empty houses. The broader district of Zhemgang is known for its rich biodiversity, particularly of bird species, and Trong Gewog is a popular destination for bird-watching.

Within Trong Gewog, there are five Chiwogs; Gomphu, Tshanglajong Zuphel, Tama Berti, Soobdrang and Dangkhar.

== Facilities ==
There are seven schools in Trong Gewog, of which five are primary schools, one is a Lower Secondary School, and one is a Higher Secondary School. There are a combined 1804 students across all seven schools.

There is one basic health unit in Trong Gewog, located in Gomphu Chiwog, and five other Out Reach Clinics (ORCs). The entire gewog has access to electricity and telecommunication coverage.

There are 12 Lhakhangs in Trong Gewog, of which five are privately owned and seven are public, belonging instead to the community.

== Duenmang Tsachu ==
Duenmang Tsachu is a hot spring located in Trong Gewog, near Gomphu Chiwog.

=== History ===
This Tshachu (hot spring) is believed to have been discovered before the 8th century when a hunter from Kamjoung village shot a deer, which fell off the steep mountain. When the hunter climbed down to the base of the cliff to retrieve the dead deer, he found hot water leaking from the rock. Guru Rinpoche, one of the founding fathers of Tibetan Buddhism, blessed the Tshachu and his sacred place (Nay) is located nearby.

=== Current use ===
This Tshachu was officially recognized in 1972 and a covered path, accommodation, toilets and waste bins were added by the Zhemgang forest division in 2016 with funding from the Bhutan Trust Fund for Environmental Conservation. People from all over the country now visit the hot spring as it believed to have healing properties for diseases such as tuberculosis, gastritis, and rheumatism.
