= Bondey =

- Location in Bhutan
- Coordinates: 27°25′47″N 89°27′35″E
- Country: Bhutan
- District: Paro District

Population (2005)
  - Total: 570

Bondey, also spelled Bongdey or Baangdey, is a village in western Bhutan. It is located in the Paro Valley of Paro District.

At the 2005 census, its population was 570.
