= Bjoka Gewog =

Bjoka Gewog འབྱོག་ཀ་
- Gewog
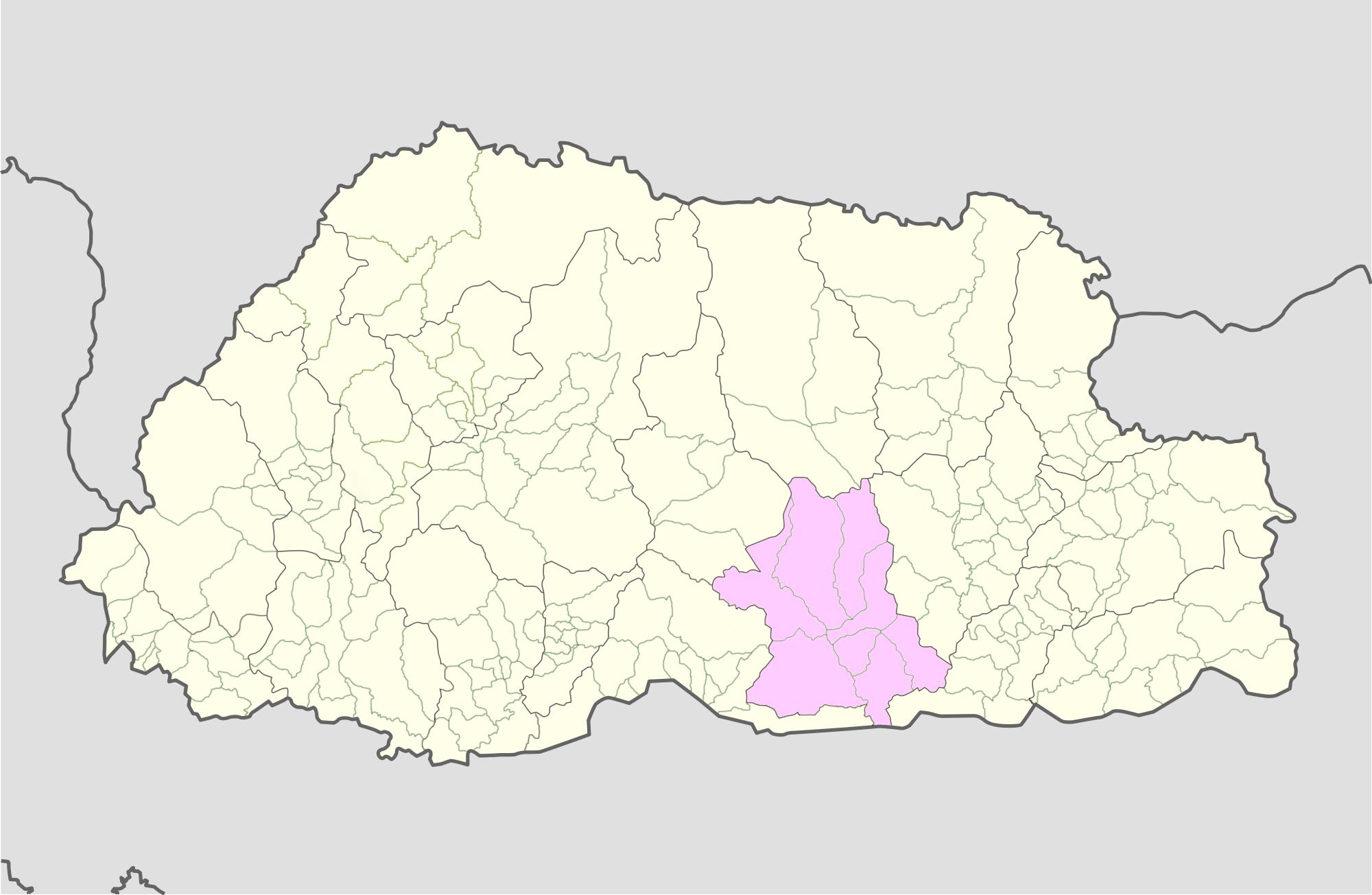
- Country: Bhutan
- District: Zhemgang District
- Time zone: UTC+6 (BTT)

Bjoka Gewog (Dzongkha: འབྱོག་ཀ་) is a gewog (village block) of Zhemgang District, Bhutan. Bjoka Gewog is also a part of Panbang Dungkhag (sub-district), along with Goshing, Ngangla, and Phangkhar Gewogs.
