= Nangkor Gewog =

Nangkor Gewog ནང་སྐོར་
- Gewog
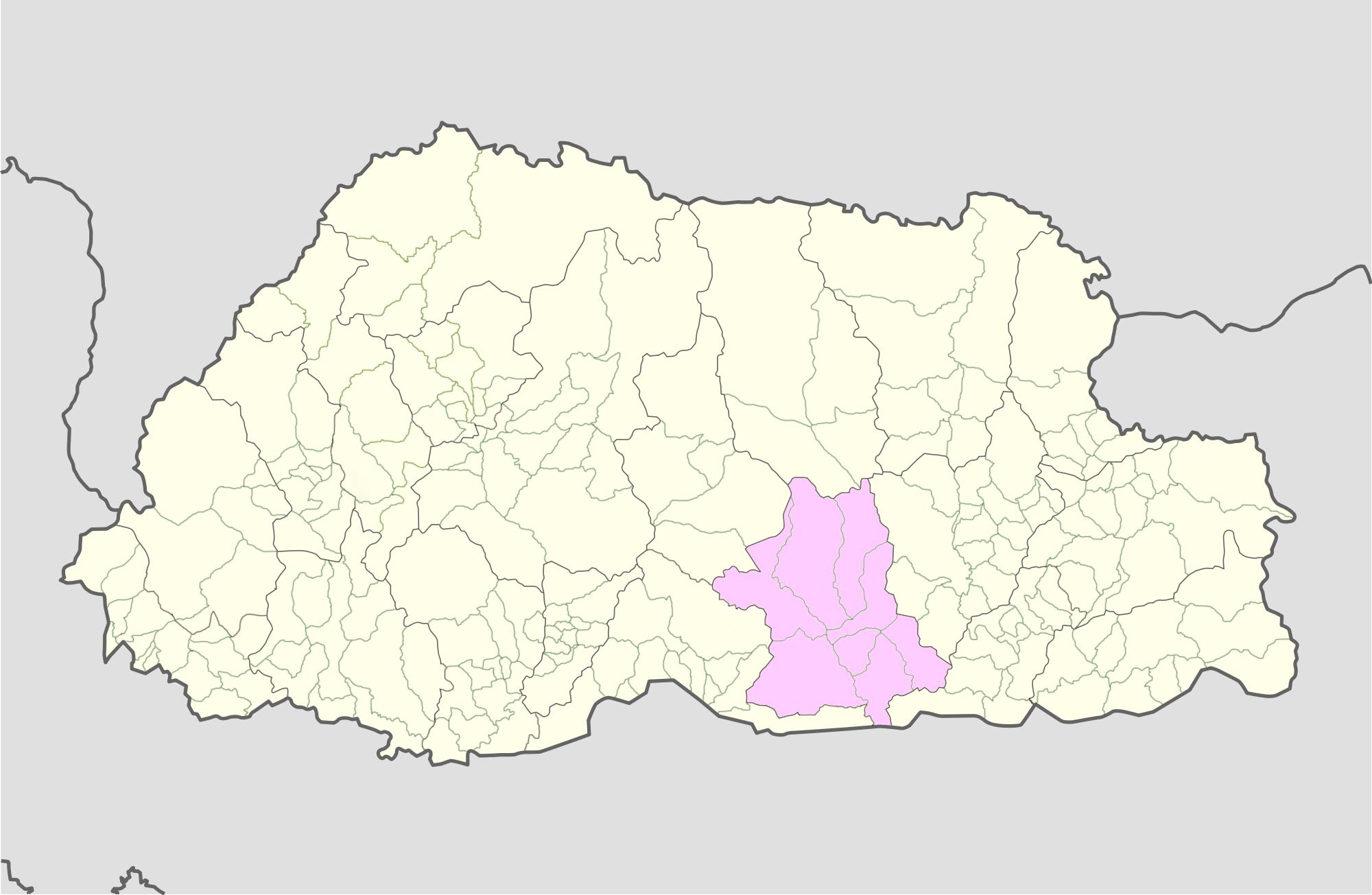
- Country: Bhutan
- District: Zhemgang District
- Time zone: UTC+6 (BTT)

Nangkor Gewog (Dzongkha: ནང་སྐོར་) is a gewog (village block) of Zhemgang District, Bhutan.

Duenmang Tshachu is located in Nangkor Gewog under the jurisdiction of the Zhemgang forest division.
