= Suray =

Suray is a surname. Notable people with the surname include:

- Olivier Suray (born 1971), Belgian footballer and manager
- Gil Suray, Belgian bike racer
