= Ngangla Gewog =

Ngangla Gewog ངང་ལ་
- Gewog
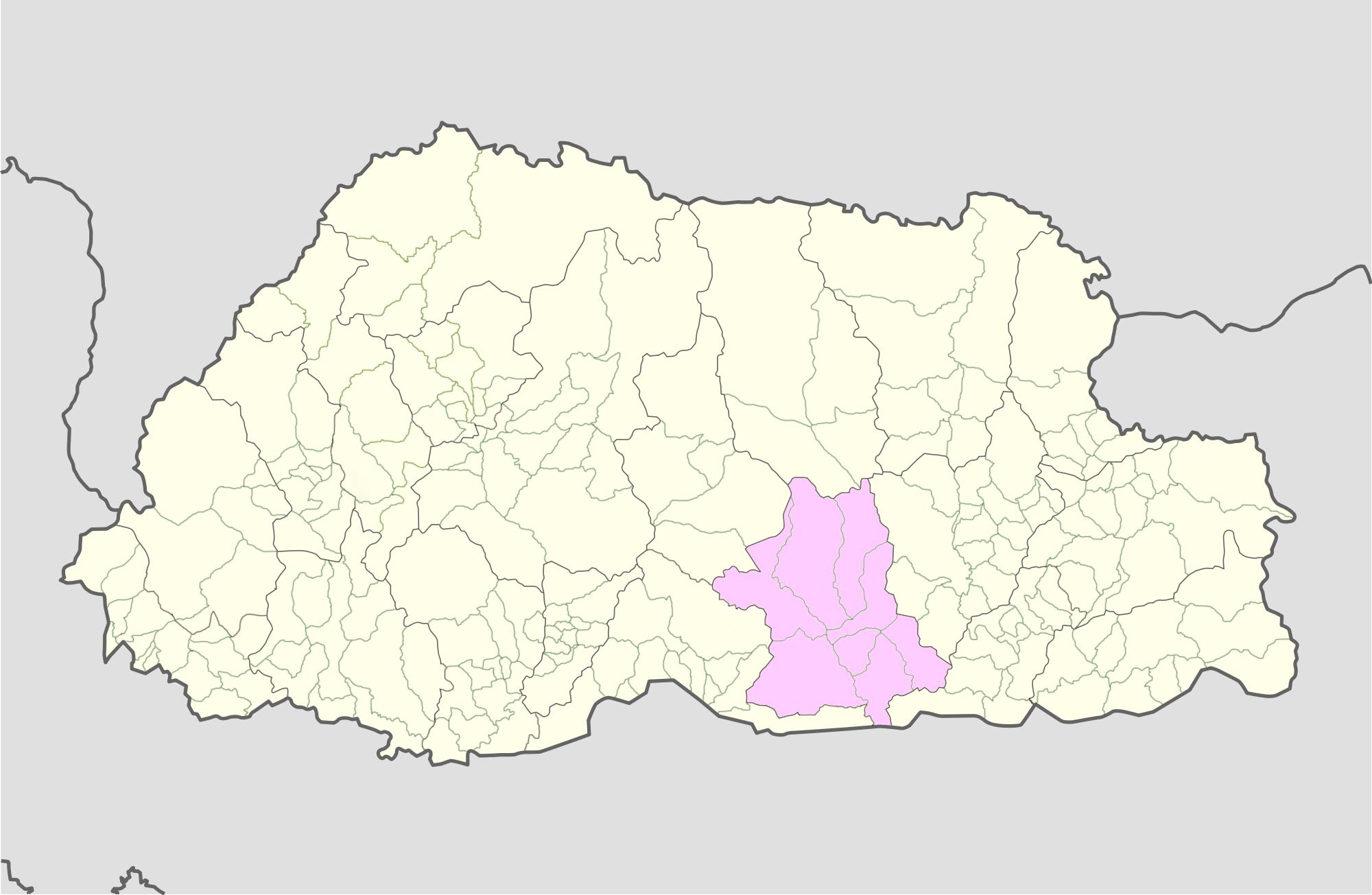
- Country: Bhutan
- District: Zhemgang District
- Time zone: UTC+6 (BTT)

Ngangla Gewog (Dzongkha: ངང་ལ་) is a gewog (village block) of Zhemgang District, Bhutan, bordering India. Ngangla Gewog is also a part of Panbang Dungkhag (sub-district), along with Goshing, Bjoka, and Phangkhar Gewogs.

In the 2005 census, the gewog had a population of 1018.

== Notable people ==
- Tshering Tshomo (born 1983) - politician
