= Jongkhar =

Town in southern Bhutan

Coordinates: 26°49′00″N 91°34′00″E

Jongkhar is a small town in southern Bhutan near the border with India.

== Transport ==
The nearest railway is about 30 km away over the border.

== See also ==
- Rail transport in Bhutan
