= Heritage Village =

Heritage Village may refer to:

Canada

- Burnaby Village Museum, Burnaby, British Columbia
- Doon Heritage Village, Kitchener, Ontario
- Mennonite Heritage Village, Steinbach, Manitoba
- Ukrainian Cultural Heritage Village, Lamont County, Alberta

India

- Kisama Heritage Village, Kohima District, Nagaland

United Arab Emirates

- Fujairah Heritage Village
- Heritage Village Dubai

United States

- Heritage Village, Connecticut, a census-designated place
  - The Heritage Village Open, a golf tournament from 1971 to 1973
- Heritage Village (Largo, Florida)
- Heritage Village Museum, a recreated 1800s community in Sharonville, Ohio
- Heritage Farm Museum and Village, a museum in West Virginia
