= Tala, Bhutan =

Tala
- Location in Bhutan
- Coordinates: 26°52′N 89°34′E
- Country: Bhutan
- District: Chukha District
- Time zone: UTC+6 (BTT)

Tala is a town in Chukha District in southwestern Bhutan, known for the Tala Hydroelectricity Project.
