= Zhemgang =

Town in Zhemgang District, Bhutan

Zhemgang ཞལམ་སྒང་།
- Location in Bhutan
- Coordinates: 27°12′48.2″N 90°39′18″E
- Country: Bhutan
- District: Zhemgang District
- Village block: Trong Gewog

Population (2005)
  - Total: 2,332
- Time zone: UTC+6 (BTT)
- Postal code: 34001
- Website: http://www.zhemgang.gov.bt

Zhemgang is a town in Zhemgang District, Bhutan. It is the capital (dzongkhag thromde) of the district, and is located in Trong Gewog.

Archaeological and ethnolinguistic evidence indicates that the Kheng people are the indigenous inhabitants of south-central Bhutan, with roots in the region stretching back over 4,000 years.

In 2005, Zhemgang had a population of 2,332.

== Zhemgang Dzong ==
Zhemgang Dzong (Dzongkha: ཞལམ་སྒང་རྫོང) sits on a ridge that drops steeply down to the Mangde Chu. Zhemgang dzong was founded as a hermitage in 12th century by Lama Zhang Dorje Drakpa of the Drukpa Kagyu school. In 1655, a single story dzong was built on the site. It is situated atop the peak of a triangular shaped ridge that rises sharply from the Mangde Chu, facing the village of Trong and the town of Zhemgang.

== Climate ==
Climate data for Zhemgang, elevation 1,905 m (6,250 ft), (1996–2017 normals)
Month	Jan	Feb	Mar	Apr	May	Jun	Jul	Aug	Sep	Oct	Nov	Dec	Year
Record high °C (°F)	19.0 (66.2)	21.5 (70.7)	24.3 (75.7)	25.2 (77.4)	27.5 (81.5)	28.0 (82.4)	28.0 (82.4)	29.5 (85.1)	29.0 (84.2)	28.0 (82.4)	26.5 (79.7)	19.9 (67.8)	29.5 (85.1)
Mean daily maximum °C (°F)	12.9 (55.2)	14.4 (57.9)	17.3 (63.1)	19.7 (67.5)	21.5 (70.7)	22.8 (73.0)	23.3 (73.9)	23.6 (74.5)	22.9 (73.2)	20.8 (69.4)	17.7 (63.9)	14.5 (58.1)	19.3 (66.7)
Daily mean °C (°F)	9.3 (48.7)	10.9 (51.6)	13.5 (56.3)	15.6 (60.1)	18.5 (65.3)	19.5 (67.1)	21.9 (71.4)	22.2 (72.0)	20.3 (68.5)	17.0 (62.6)	15.3 (59.5)	10.5 (50.9)	16.2 (61.2)
Mean daily minimum °C (°F)	4.4 (39.9)	6.2 (43.2)	9.4 (48.9)	12.5 (54.5)	15.1 (59.2)	17.2 (63.0)	17.9 (64.2)	17.8 (64.0)	16.6 (61.9)	13.0 (55.4)	9.1 (48.4)	6.0 (42.8)	12.1 (53.8)
Record low °C (°F)	−0.5 (31.1)	0.2 (32.4)	2.6 (36.7)	6.0 (42.8)	9.5 (49.1)	11.0 (51.8)	15.8 (60.4)	14.9 (58.8)	11.5 (52.7)	6.0 (42.8)	4.0 (39.2)	1.0 (33.8)	−0.5 (31.1)
Average rainfall mm (inches)	10.9 (0.43)	19.7 (0.78)	47.1 (1.85)	75.3 (2.96)	130.9 (5.15)	235.0 (9.25)	333.2 (13.12)	246.2 (9.69)	194.9 (7.67)	98.0 (3.86)	7.0 (0.28)	5.6 (0.22)	1,403.8 (55.26)
Average relative humidity (%)	72.7	73.7	70.5	76.4	79.8	86.3	87.5	86.1	85.2	75.5	72.1	71.3	78.1
Source: National Center for Hydrology and Meteorology
