= Zhemgang District =

District of Bhutan

Coordinates: 27°0′N 90°45′E

Zhemgang District གཞལམ་སྒང་རྫོང་ཁག།
- District
- Location of Zhemgang district within Bhutan
- Country: Bhutan
- Headquarters: Zhemgang

Area
  - Total: 2,421 km^{2} (935 sq mi)

Population (2017)
  - Total: 17,763
  - Density: 7.337/km^{2} (19.00/sq mi)
- Time zone: UTC+6 (BTT)
- HDI (2019): 0.603 medium · 16th of 20
- Website: www.zhemgang.gov.bt

Zhemgang District (Dzongkha: གཞལམ་སྒང་རྫོང་ཁག།; Wylie transliteration: Gzhams-sgang rdzong-khag; previously "Shemgang"), is one of the 20 dzongkhags (districts) constituting Bhutan. It is bordered by Sarpang, Trongsa, Bumthang, Mongar and Pemagatshel Districts, and borders Assam in India to the south. The administrative center of the district is Zhemgang. Major attractions of the Zhemgang district are Buli Tsho and Duenmang Tshachu.

== Languages ==
The dominant language in Zhemgang is Khengkha. Historically, Khengkha and its speakers have had close contact with speakers of Kurtöpkha, Nupbikha, and Bumthangkha to the north, to the extent that they may be considered part of a wider collection of "Bumthang languages."

Linguist and ethnographer Dr. Tim Bodt notes that the people of Kheng, Bumthang, Kurtöe and Trongsa Mangdue have a deep, indigenous history in Bhutan.

Archaeological and ethnolinguistic evidence indicates that the Kheng people are the indigenous inhabitants of south-central Bhutan, with roots in the region stretching back over 4000 years.

Chakravarty asserts that Kheng are one of the earliest inhabitants that language spread upwards from Kheng into Bumthang and Kurtöp. By all accounts the Kheng are more closely related to the people of central Bhutan such as the Bumthaps, Kurtöps and Trongsa Mangdue.

The Kheng still retain special trade relations with the Bumthang, including providing winter pasture rights for Bumthang yaks. SIL International estimates there are 50,000 Kheng speakers.

== Security issues ==
Starting in the 1990s, the United Liberation Front of Assam maintained guerrilla bases in the forests of southern Zhemgang from which they would launch attacks on targets in India and then return across the border. In late 2003 the King of Bhutan, Jigme Singye Wangchuck led a military operation which largely swept the guerrillas out of the region. Because of the risk of attack, foreign tourists were not allowed to visit Zhemgang in the past.

== Administrative divisions ==
Zhemgang District comprises eight village blocks (or gewogs):

- Bardho Gewog
- Bjoka Gewog
- Goshing Gewog
- Nangkor Gewog
- Ngangla Gewog
- Phangkhar Gewog
- Shingkhar Gewog
- Trong Gewog

== Environment ==
Most of Zhemgang District is part of the protected areas of Bhutan. Zhemgang's environmentally protected areas include Jigme Singye Wangchuck National Park (the gewog of Trong) and Royal Manas National Park (the gewogs of Ngangla, Pangkhar and Trong), which occupy much of the west. These parks connect to Phrumsengla National Park in the north (the gewogs of Nangkor and Shingkhar) via a biological corridor that bisects Zhemgang.

== Tourism ==
Zhemgang Dzong

Zhemgang Dzong, also known as Druk Dechen Yangtse Dzong, was built by Zhabdrung Ngawang Namgyal as a symbol of the unification of Khengrig Namsum in 1655.

Buli Tsho

Buli Tsho is a sacred lake believed to be the Palace of Tshomen Kuntu Zangmo, also known as Buli Moenmo, a protector goddess of Kheng Buli nestled in the dense forest of Buli village.

Duenmang Tshachu

Duenmang Tshachu is one of the popular hot springs located on the right bank of the Mangdechhu in Nangkor Gewog under Zhemgang Dzongkhag at an elevation of 500 meters above sea level.

== Climate ==
Climate data for Zhemgang, elevation 1,905 m (6,250 ft), (1996–2017 normals)
Month	Jan	Feb	Mar	Apr	May	Jun	Jul	Aug	Sep	Oct	Nov	Dec	Year
Record high °C (°F)	19.0 (66.2)	21.5 (70.7)	24.3 (75.7)	25.2 (77.4)	27.5 (81.5)	28.0 (82.4)	28.0 (82.4)	29.5 (85.1)	29.0 (84.2)	28.0 (82.4)	26.5 (79.7)	19.9 (67.8)	29.5 (85.1)
Mean daily maximum °C (°F)	12.9 (55.2)	14.4 (57.9)	17.3 (63.1)	19.7 (67.5)	21.5 (70.7)	22.8 (73.0)	23.3 (73.9)	23.6 (74.5)	22.9 (73.2)	20.8 (69.4)	17.7 (63.9)	14.5 (58.1)	19.3 (66.7)
Daily mean °C (°F)	9.3 (48.7)	10.9 (51.6)	13.5 (56.3)	15.6 (60.1)	18.5 (65.3)	19.5 (67.1)	21.9 (71.4)	22.2 (72.0)	20.3 (68.5)	17.0 (62.6)	15.3 (59.5)	10.5 (50.9)	16.2 (61.2)
Mean daily minimum °C (°F)	4.4 (39.9)	6.2 (43.2)	9.4 (48.9)	12.5 (54.5)	15.1 (59.2)	17.2 (63.0)	17.9 (64.2)	17.8 (64.0)	16.6 (61.9)	13.0 (55.4)	9.1 (48.4)	6.0 (42.8)	12.1 (53.8)
Record low °C (°F)	−0.5 (31.1)	0.2 (32.4)	2.6 (36.7)	6.0 (42.8)	9.5 (49.1)	11.0 (51.8)	15.8 (60.4)	14.9 (58.8)	11.5 (52.7)	6.0 (42.8)	4.0 (39.2)	1.0 (33.8)	−0.5 (31.1)
Average rainfall mm (inches)	10.9 (0.43)	19.7 (0.78)	47.1 (1.85)	75.3 (2.96)	130.9 (5.15)	235.0 (9.25)	333.2 (13.12)	246.2 (9.69)	194.9 (7.67)	98.0 (3.86)	7.0 (0.28)	5.6 (0.22)	1,403.8 (55.26)
Average relative humidity (%)	72.7	73.7	70.5	76.4	79.8	86.3	87.5	86.1	85.2	75.5	72.1	71.3	78.1
Source: National Center for Hydrology and Meteorology

== See also ==
- Districts of Bhutan
- Trongsa Province
