= Chilo =

Chilo may refer to:

- Chilo of Sparta, one of the Seven Sages of Greece
- Chilo, Ohio, a village in Clermont County, Ohio
- Chilo, Bhutan
- Chilo (moth), a genus of crambid moths
- André Chilo (1898–1982), French rugby player
- Chilo Rachal (born 1986), American football player
