= Chilo, Ohio =

- Village
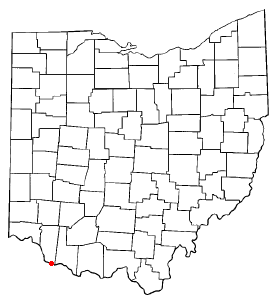
- Location of Chilo, Ohio

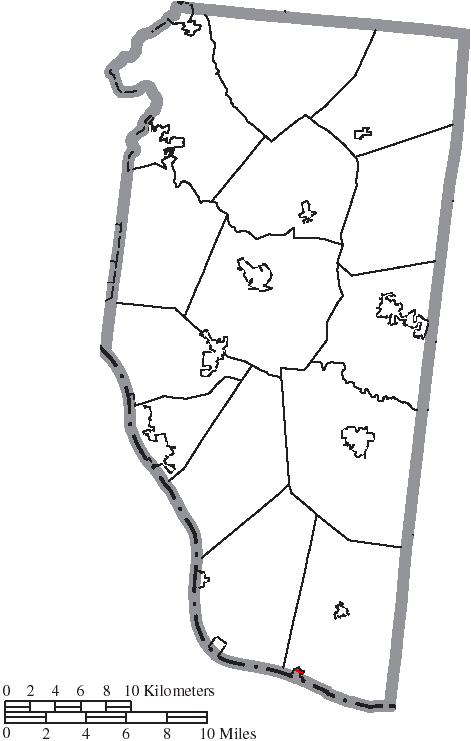
- Location of Chilo in Clermont County
- Coordinates: 38°47′36″N 84°08′14″W
- Country: United States
- State: Ohio
- County: Clermont
- Township: Franklin

Government
  - Mayor: Marie Stevenson

Area
  - Total: 0.24 sq mi (0.63 km^{2})
  - Land: 0.20 sq mi (0.52 km^{2})
  - Water: 0.042 sq mi (0.11 km^{2})
- Elevation: 502 ft (153 m)

Population (2020)
  - Total: 71
  - Estimate (2023): 72
  - Density: 350.8/sq mi (135.43/km^{2})
- Time zone: UTC-5 (Eastern (EST))
  - Summer (DST): UTC-4 (EDT)
- ZIP code: 45112
- Area code: 513
- FIPS code: 39-14226
- GNIS feature ID: 2397622

Chilo /ˈʃaɪloʊ/ or /ˈtʃaɪloʊ/ is a village in Clermont County, Ohio, United States, along the Ohio River. The population was 71 at the 2020 census.

== History ==
Chilo was originally called Mechanicsburgh, and under the latter name was platted in 1816. A post office called Mechanicsburg was established in 1819. The village's name was changed to Chilo in 1820 by an act of the Ohio Legislature. By the 1830s, was home of boat building businesses, which swelled the population to several hundred. Chilo had more than thirty houses and two stores. The town was the site of Lock #34 on the Ohio River up until the 1960s, when nearby Meldahl Dam was built. The original lock building is home to the Ohio River Museum, operated by the Clermont County Parks Department.

== Geography ==
According to the United States Census Bureau, the village has a total area of 0.24 square miles (0.62 km^{2}), of which 0.20 square miles (0.52 km^{2}) is land and 0.04 square miles (0.10 km^{2}) is water.

== Demographics ==
Historical population
Census	Pop.	Note	%±
1860	147		—
1870	160		8.8%
1880	200		25.0%
1970	174		—
1980	173		−0.6%
1990	130		−24.9%
2000	97		−25.4%
2010	63		−35.1%
2020	71		12.7%
2023 (est.)	72	▲	1.4%
U.S. Decennial Census

=== 2010 census ===
As of the census of 2010, there were 63 people, 28 households, and 14 families living in the village. The population density was 315.0 inhabitants per square mile (121.6/km^{2}). There were 56 housing units at an average density of 280.0 per square mile (108.1/km^{2}). The racial makeup of the village was 98.4% White and 1.6% Native American.

There were 28 households, of which 21.4% had children under the age of 18 living with them, 46.4% were married couples living together, 3.6% had a female householder with no husband present, and 50.0% were non-families. 46.4% of all households were made up of individuals, and 17.8% had someone living alone who was 65 years of age or older. The average household size was 2.25 and the average family size was 3.29.

The median age in the village was 50.8 years. 14.3% of residents were under the age of 18; 4.7% were between the ages of 18 and 24; 22.2% were from 25 to 44; 36.5% were from 45 to 64; and 22.2% were 65 years of age or older. The gender makeup of the village was 41.3% male and 58.7% female.

=== 2000 census ===
As of the census of 2000, there were 97 people, 28 households, and 21 families living in the village. The population density was 315 inhabitants per square mile (122/km^{2}). There were 48 housing units at an average density of 241.1 per square mile (93.1/km^{2}). The racial makeup of the village was 97.94% White, 1.03% Native American, 1.03% from other races.

There were 39 households, out of which 20.5% had children under the age of 18 living with them, 48.7% were married couples living together, 5.1% had a female householder with no husband present, and 43.6% were non-families. 35.9% of all households were made up of individuals, and 15.4% had someone living alone who was 65 years of age or older. The average household size was 2.49 and the average family size was 3.23.

In the village, the population was spread out, with 24.7% under the age of 18, 7.2% from 18 to 24, 20.6% from 25 to 44, 27.8% from 45 to 64, and 19.6% who were 65 years of age or older. The median age was 44 years. For every 100 females, there were 115.6 males. For every 100 females age 18 and over, there were 82.5 males.

The median income for a household in the village was $38,333, and the median income for a family was $51,250. Males had a median income of $26,250 versus $26,250 for females. The per capita income for the village was $15,197. There were 4.8% of families and 12.4% of the population living below the poverty line, including 22.7% of under eighteens and 5.6% of those over 64.

== Gallery ==
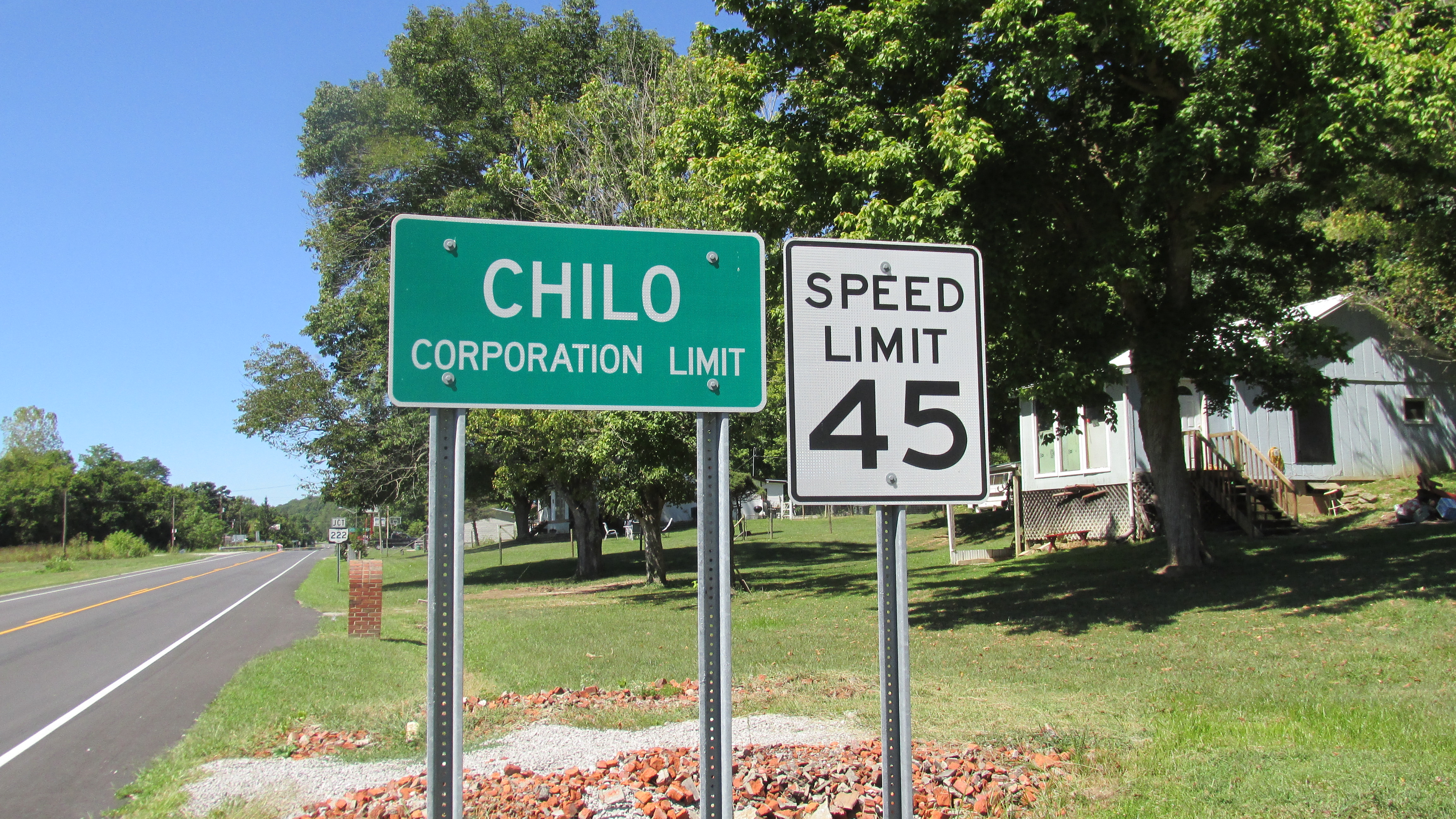
Chilo corporation limit sign.

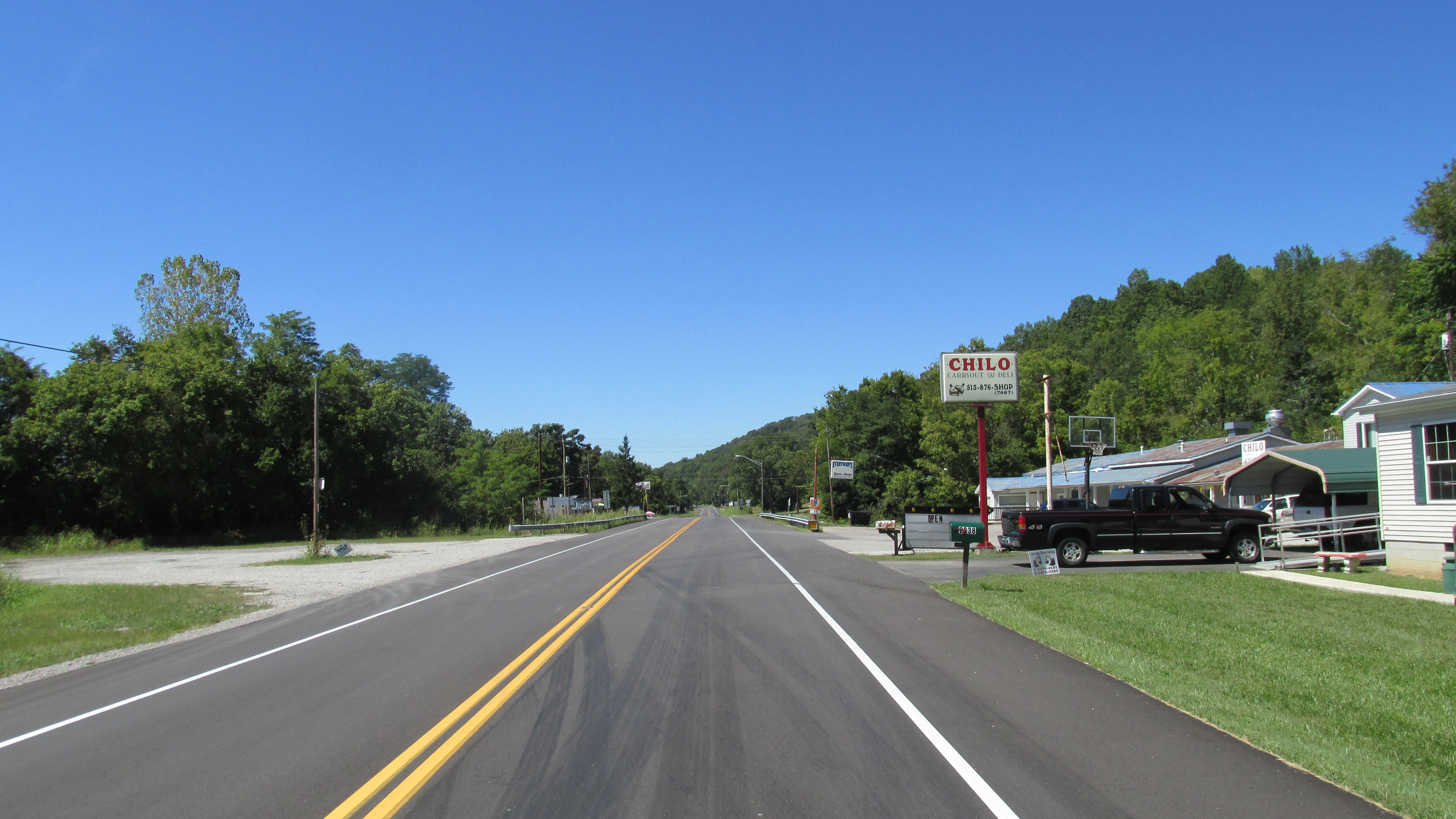
Looking west on US Highway 52 in Chilo.

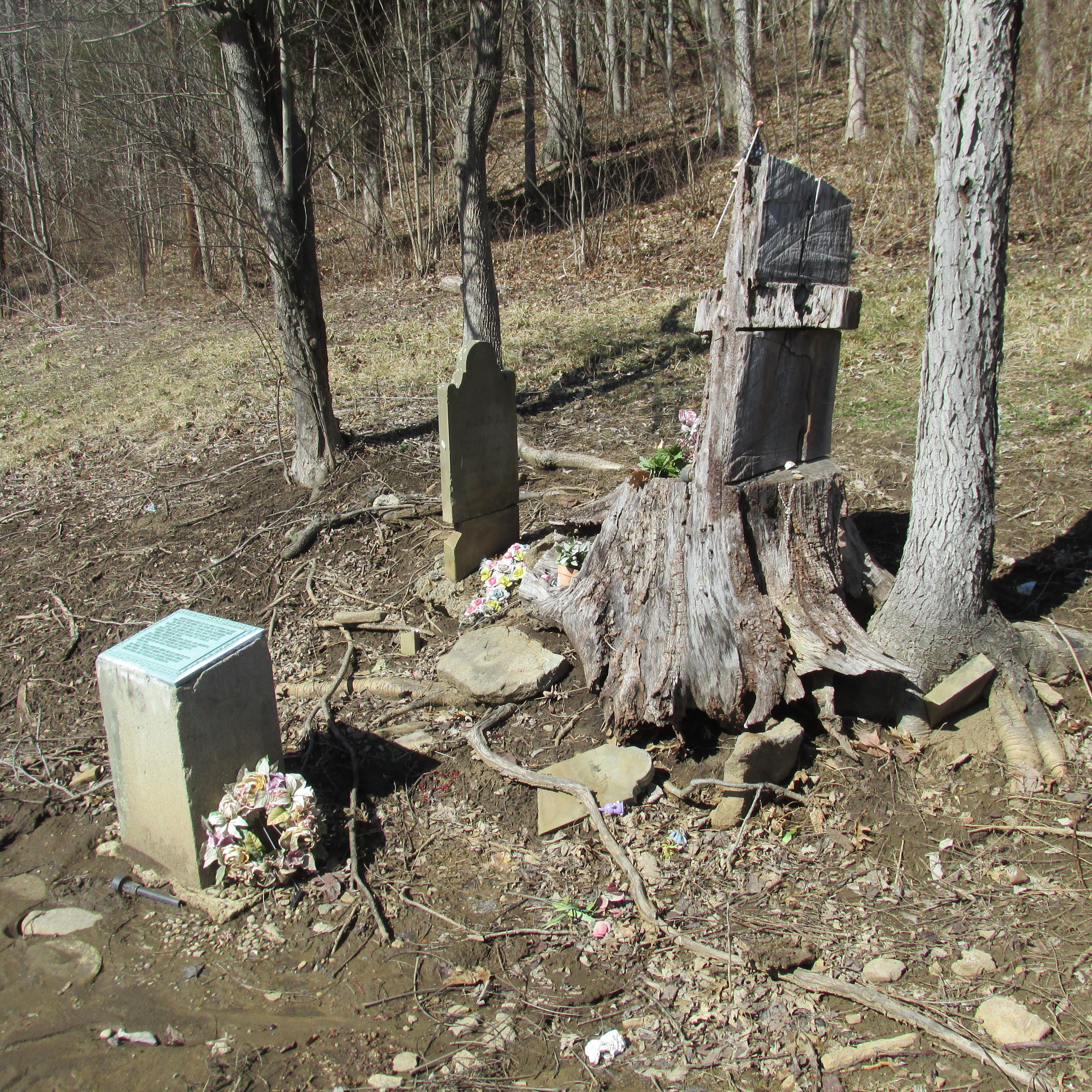
Grave of Diana Whitney (died July 23, 1823) located next to US Highway 52 west of Chilo.

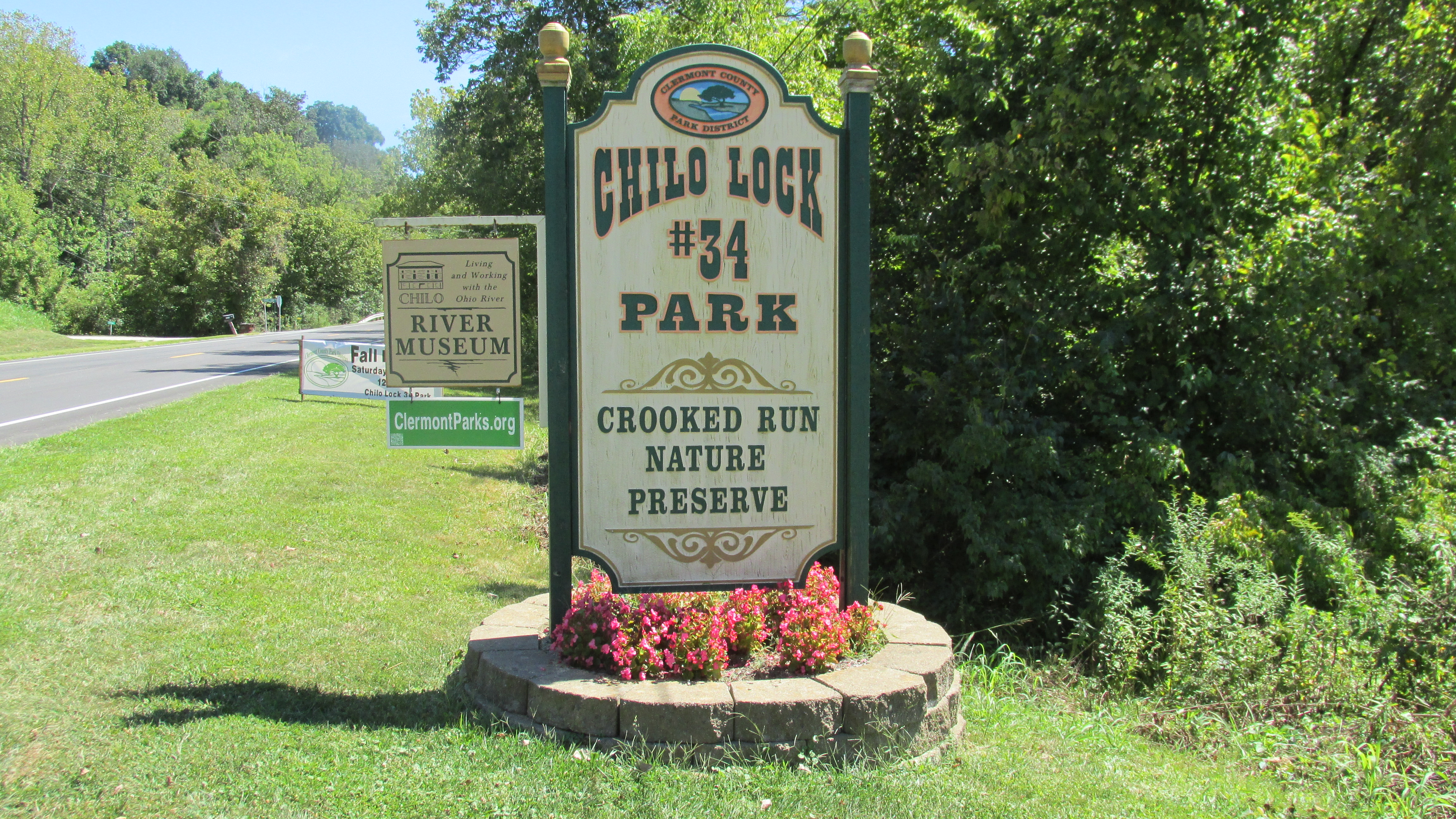
Chilo Lock #34 Park.

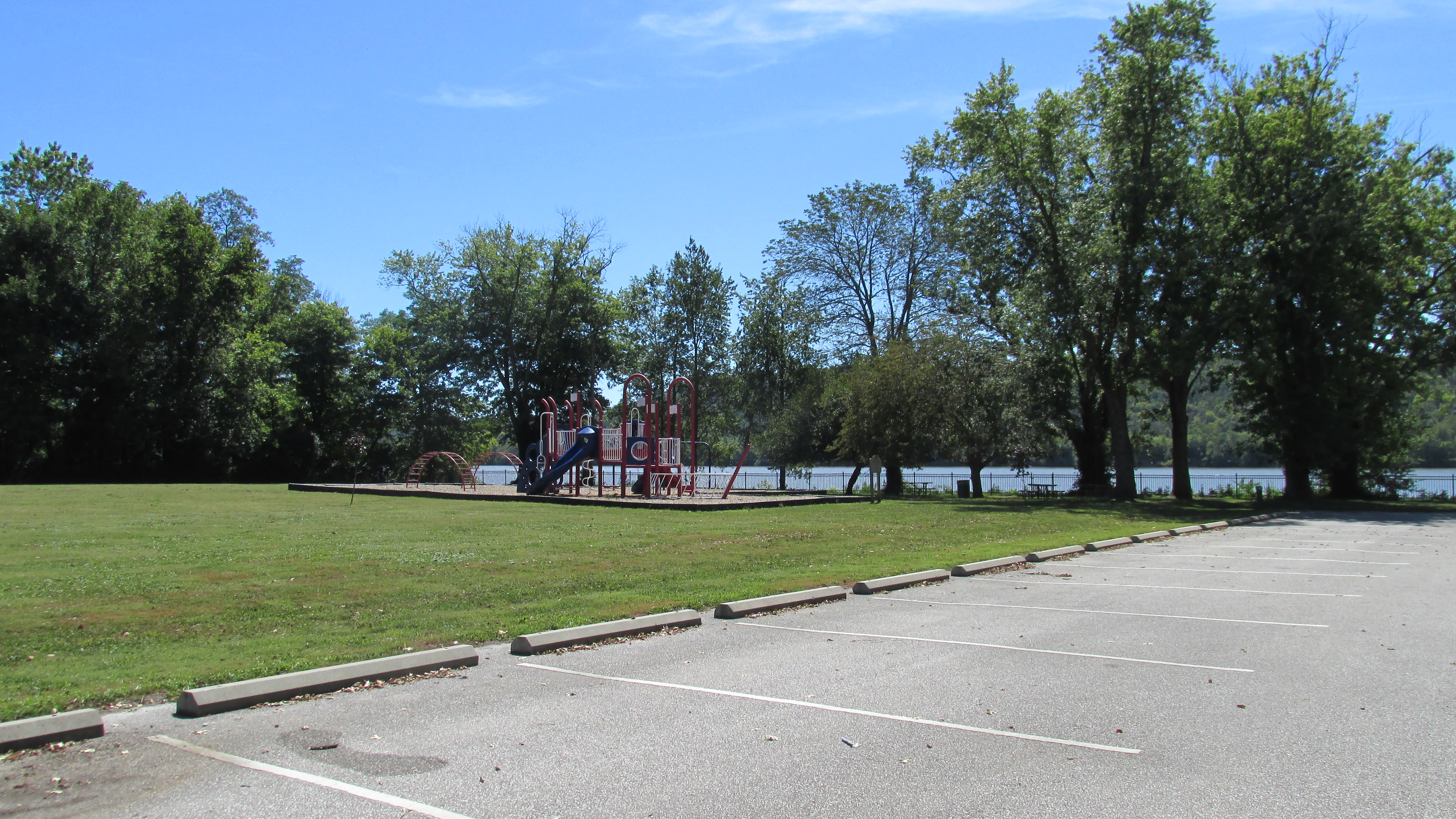
Chilo Lock #34 Park.

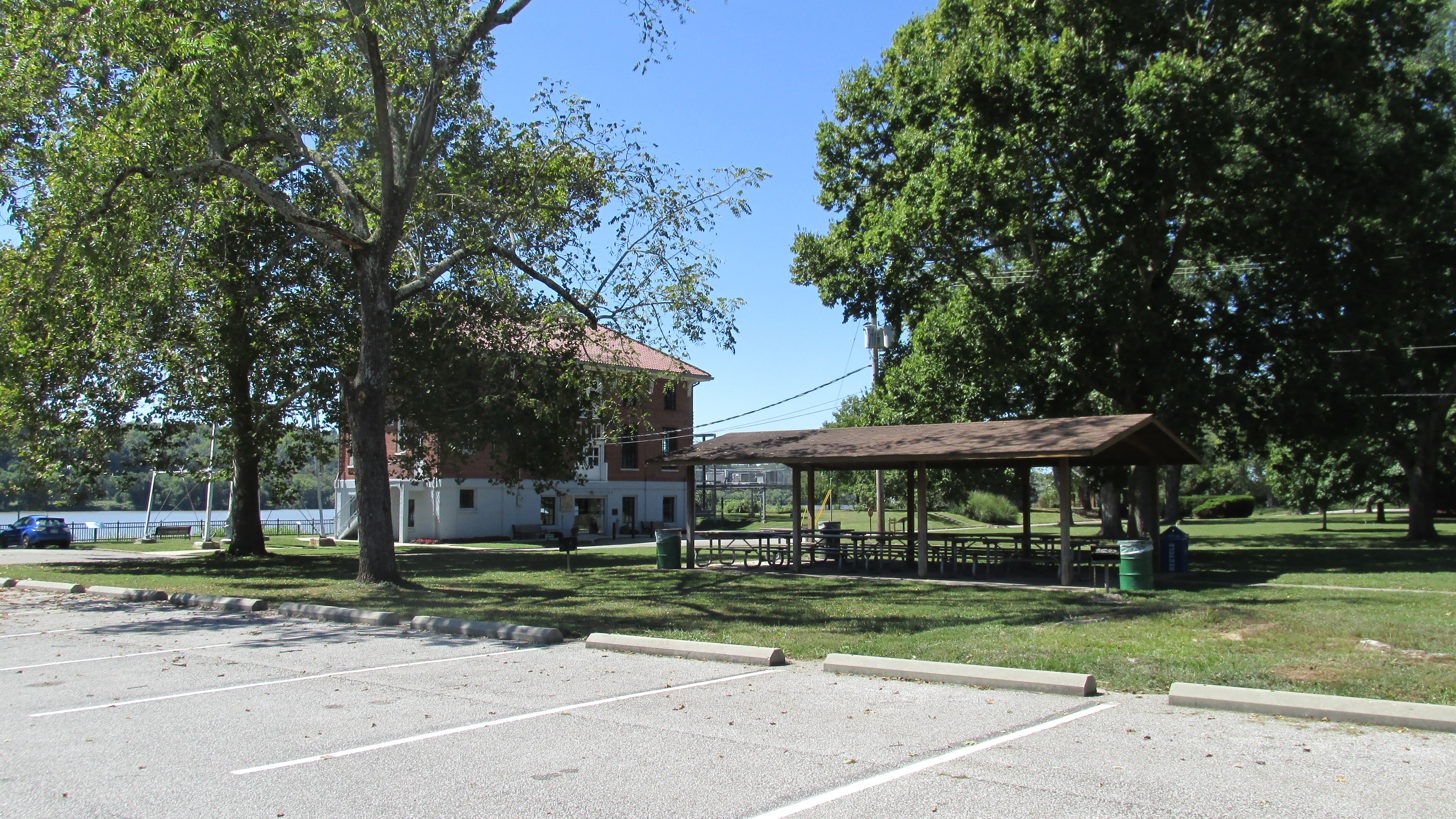
Chilo Lock #34 Park.

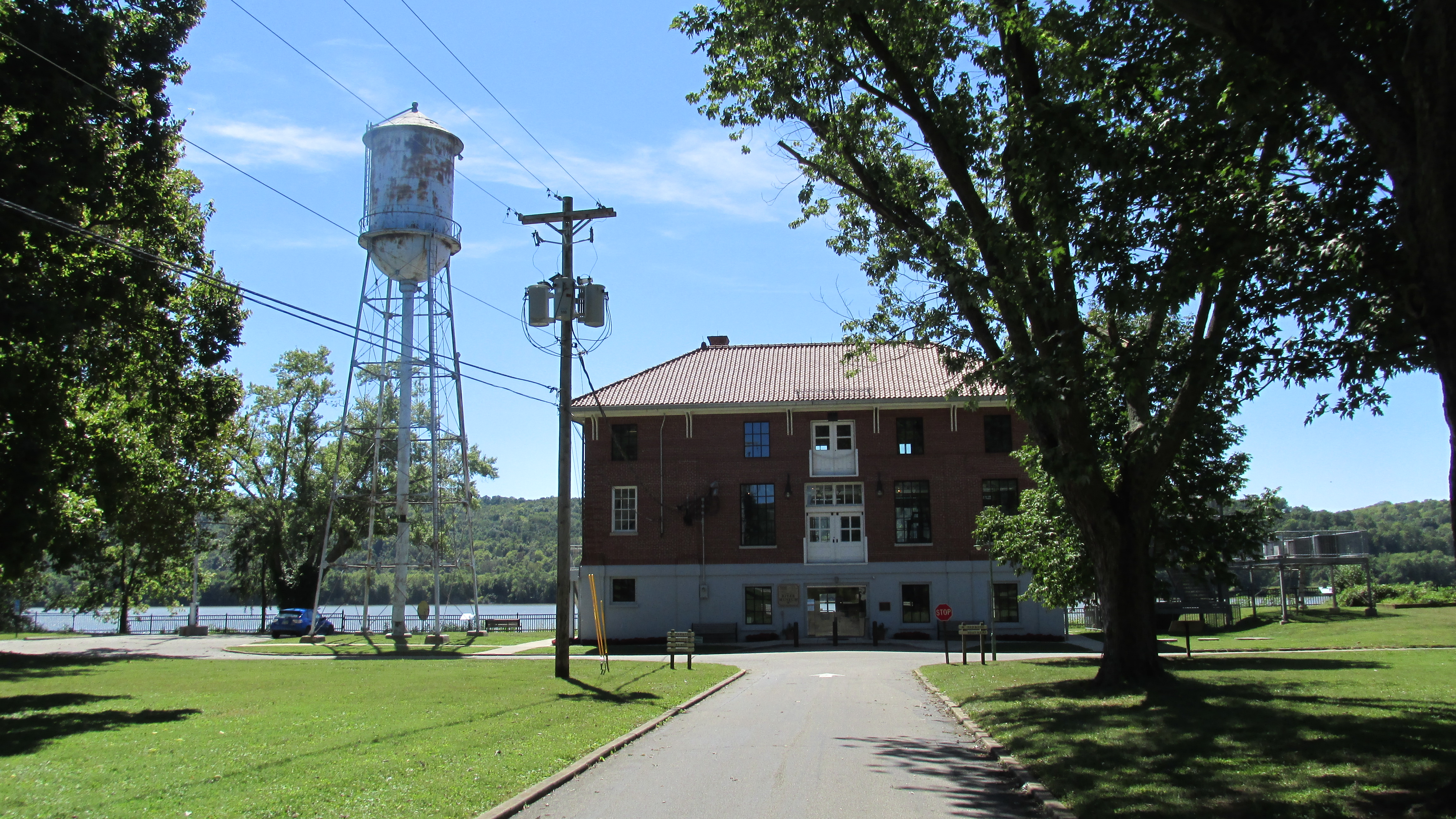
Chilo Lock #34 Park.

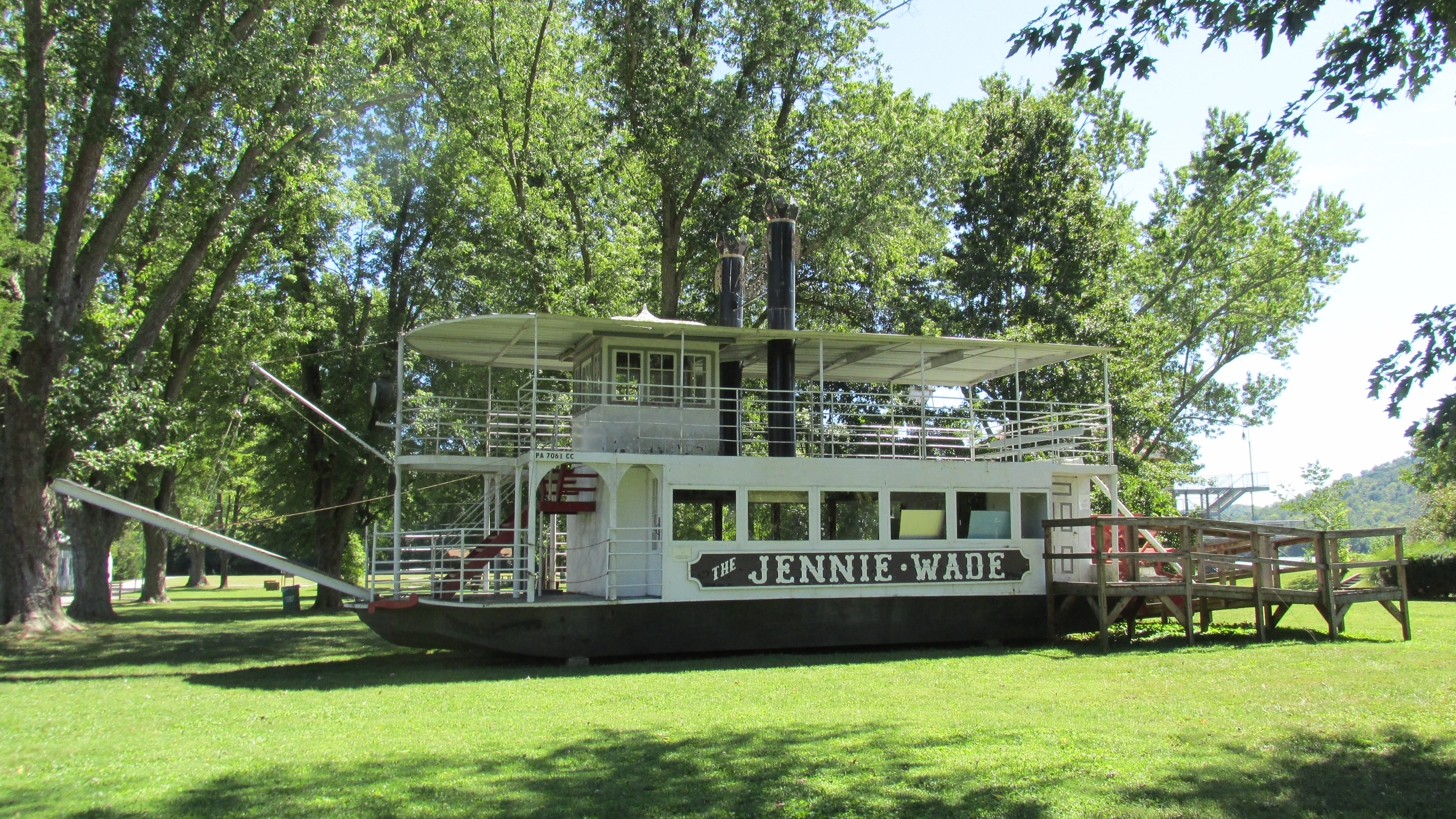
Chilo Lock #34 Park.

== See also ==
- List of cities and towns along the Ohio River
