= Chitokha =

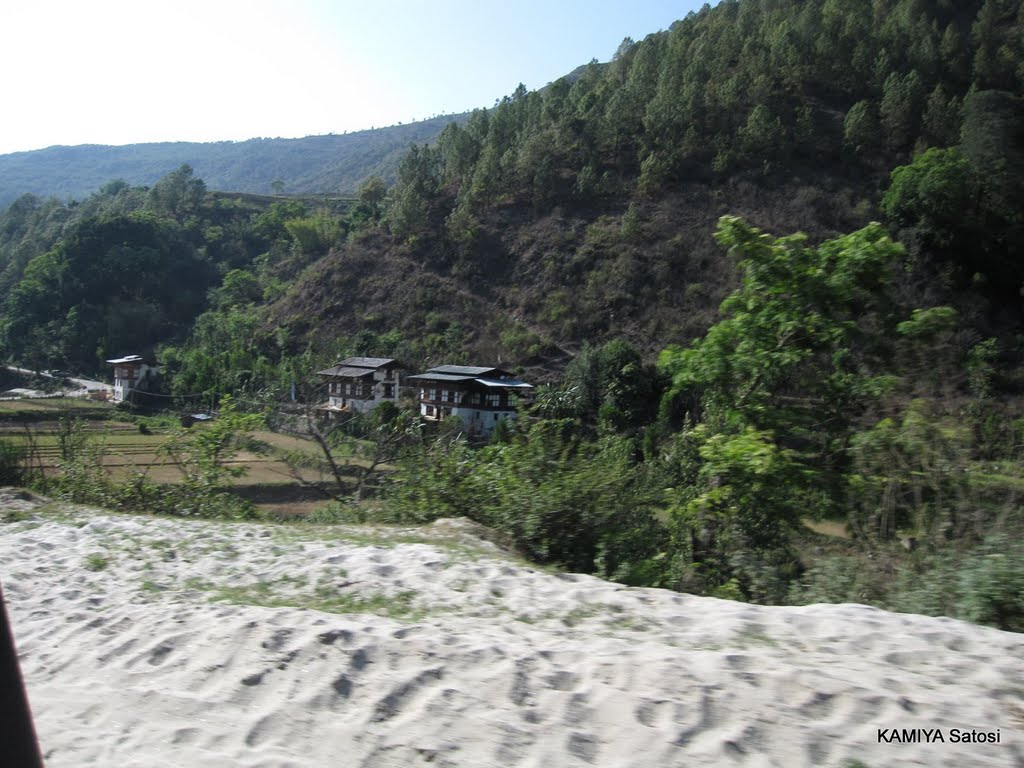
- Several kilometres south of Chitokha

- Location in Bhutan
- Coordinates: 27°33′N 90°0′E
- Country: Bhutan
- District: Wangdue Phodrang District
- Village block: Nyisho Gewog
- Time zone: UTC+6 (BTT)

Chitokha is a town in Wangdue Phodrang District in central Bhutan.
