= Jigme Singye Wangchuck National Park =

National park in Bhutan

- IUCN category II (national park)
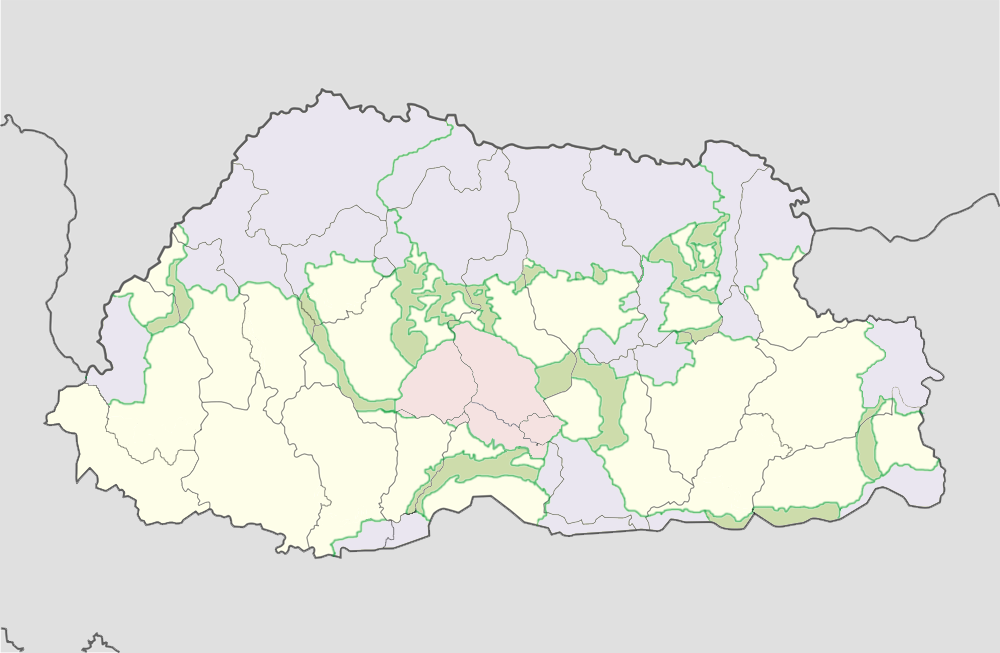
- Location of Jigme Singye Wangchuck National Park in pink
- Interactive map of Jigme Singye Wangchuck National Park
- Location: Sarpang, Tsirang, Trongsa, Wangdue Phodrang, and Zhemgang, Bhutan
- Coordinates: 27°16′57.82″N 90°23′3.84″E
- Area: 1,730 km^{2} (670 sq mi)
- Established: 1995
- Named for: Jigme Singye Wangchuck
- Governing body: Department of Forests and Park Services of Bhutan
- Operator: Park Manager
- Owner: Government of Bhutan
- Website: dofps.gov.bt

Jigme Singye Wangchuck National Park (formerly Black Mountains National Park) covers an area of 1,730 square kilometres (670 sq mi) in central Bhutan. It protects a large area of the Black Mountains, a sub-range of the Himalayan Range System.

The park occupies most of the Trongsa District, as well as parts of Sarpang, Tsirang, Wangdue Phodrang, and Zhemgang Districts.

The park is bounded to the east by the Mangde Chhu and reaches the Sankosh River−Punatsangchu basin to the west. Jigme Singye abuts Royal Manas National Park to the southeast.

Along the border of the park, from north to southeast run Bhutan's main east-west and north-south highways. It is also connected via biological corridors to other national parks in northern, eastern, central, and southern Bhutan. Habitats of the Eastern Himalayan broadleaf forests ecoregion are protected within the park

== Geography ==
Jigme Singye Wangchuck National Park is the most centrally located among the national parks of Bhutan. Covering an area of 1,730 km^{2}, it forms a contiguous belt linking Royal Manas National Park in the south to the temperate and alpine vegetation in the north. The park mainly falls under the political jurisdiction of five districts, Tsirang, Sarpang, Wangdue, Zhemgang and Trongsa.

=== Significance ===
JSWNP represents the best example of the mid-Himalayan ecosystems of the Eastern Himalaya that contain several ecological biomes ranging from subtropical forests at lower altitudes to alpine meadows at their highest altitudes. It is the only park that contains an old-growth Chir pine forest (Pinus roxburghii). The park is also vital for various migratory faunal species, particularly migratory birds, due to its wide range in altitude and vegetation, as well as its central location in the country. It covers a wide range of habitat types from permanent ice atop Durshingla peak (Black Mountain) and alpine lakes and pastures, down through conifer and broad-leaved forests to temperate and sub-tropical forests. The park protects the largest and biodiversity richest temperate forest area in the entire Himalayas.

The high mountains in the central regions of the national park are an important watershed for the streams and rivers that become the headwaters and tributaries of the Mangde Chhu River to the west. The Nika Cchu joins the Mangde Chhu from the north.

== Administration ==
=== Head Office ===
The park's head office is located in Tshangkha, near the national highway in Trongsa District.

Map 1: Location of the Jigme Singye Wangchuck National Park headquarters in Tshangkha, in the Trongsa District of central Bhutan.

The park has four administrative Park Ranges (divisions), each with its own range office (shown in map 2).

Map 2: Location of the 4 Park Range's offices within the National Park.

=== Taksha Park Range ===
Oversees the Athang Gewog of Wangdiphodrang Dzongkhag and Sergithang Gewog of Tsirang Dzongkhag .

=== Langthel Park Range ===
Oversees the Tangsibji Gewog and Langthil Gewogs.

=== Tingtibi Park Range ===
Covers the Trong Gewog in Zhemgang Dzongkhag.

=== Nabji Park Range ===
Covers Korphu Gewog in Trongsa and Jigmechhoeling Gewog in Sarpang Dzongkhag. This range covers the most remote areas of the park. This range is also home to some of the most important historic sites, such as the Nabji Lhakhang.

In addition to the 4 Park Ranges, the park also has 2 administrative Deputy Ranges (subdistricts), the Chendebji Deputy Range, located within the Langthel Park Range, and the Athang Deputy Range, located within the Taksha Park Range.

Map 3: Location of the 2 Deputy Ranges' offices within the National Park.

Staffing

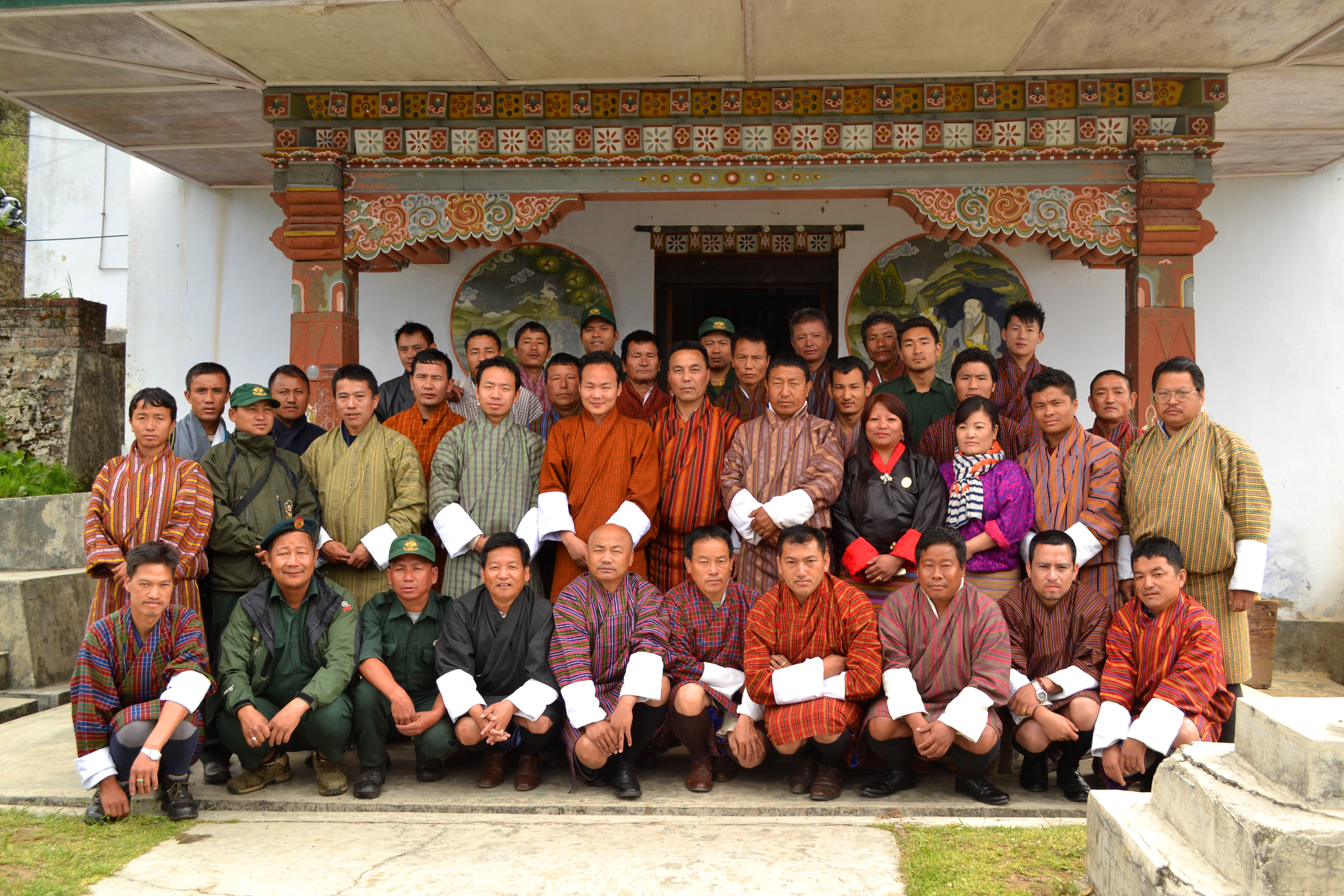
JSWNP Staff strength, 2016

Jigme Singye Wangchuck National Park is currently staffed by 38 personnel, comprising 34 technical staff members and 4 non-technical staff members. They are spread throughout the park and are based at the Park Headquarters or one of the six Park Range or Deputy Range offices.

=== Mission and goals ===
The mission of the park is to "Conserve and manage its Natural Biodiversity in Harmony with People's Values and Aspirations". The following goals support the mission:

- Conserve, protect and maintain the viability of specific ecosystems and animal and plant communities in a manner that allows natural processes of succession and evolution to continue with minimal human influence.
- Protect cultural, historical and religious sites.
- Contribute to the socio-economic development of park residents by promoting the sustainable use of park natural resources.

Future plans

The park emphasizes research and monitoring, wildlife management, conservation education, sustainable livelihoods, and enhancing social welfare within and around the park. It encourages local inhabitants to engage in community-based ecotourism projects and services, thereby enhancing their living standards and sustaining their local environment and biodiversity.

==== Achievements ====
Since its gazettement in 1995, Jigme Singye Wangchuck National Park has effectively delivered the forestry service to the park residents and efficiently managed the natural heritage through tireless efforts. The national park has delivered many Integrated Conservation and Development Programmes through various funding agencies to the local communities, the striking ones being the establishment of Nabji-Korphu Community-based Ecotourism, Adha-Rukha Community Trail, and the supply of CGI Sheets to the economically backward residents.

In terms of conservation, the national park has conducted many surveys like biological corridor survey to assess the functionality of various corridors connecting other protected area systems, biodiversity survey to ascertain the biodiversity richness of the national park, tiger survey to relate predator prey dynamics, anti-poaching patrolling activities to inspect poaching incidents and apprehend the culprits, thus securing a wildlife habitats.

== Functional Sections ==
The Park has four functional sections located within the head Office, besides the park range offices.

These are;

=== Research and Monitoring Section ===
This is the unit which oversees and coordinates all the research within the national park.

=== Forest Protection and Land Use Section ===
This section serves as the main body of the park, protecting its flora and fauna. It is also responsible for managing the data on resource utilization by park residents. This section also oversees the issuance of forestry clearances and deals with various wildlife offences which occur in the park.

=== Integrated Conservation and Development Programme Section ===
This section looks after all socio-economic activities within the park. It also acts as a functional link between the conservation and the developmental activities within the national park.

=== Social Forestry and Extension Section ===
This section oversees all activities related to plantations, private forestry and the community forests within the national park.

== Natural history ==
The park's north-central region has an exceptionally rugged topography, with peaks rising to almost 5,000 metres (16,000 ft) in elevation, while the southern areas are relatively less steep and rugged.

Geologically, the mountains are moderately recent and steep-sided, consisting largely of Pre-Cambrian and early Paleozoic quartzite and gneiss, with some areas featuring sedimentary limestone, dolomite, sandstone and shales. The soils are generally clay loam, with good permeability and moderate moisture retention.

=== Hydrology ===
The eastern boundary of the park, from Trongsa to Tingtibi, is defined by the Mangde Chhu River, whereas Punatsangchu touches the mid-western part of the park in Taksha. The Nika chhu river drains the Chendebji valley in the northern part of the park by joining the Mangdechu river. Numerous other streams and rivulets originate from the snow-fed alpine lakes in the Black Mountain area, with melting snow and monsoon rain contributing to the water volume. This network of small perennial and annual tributaries flows down the steep slopes, often as waterfalls, and along the valleys to become tributaries of the larger rivers. The distinct rainy and dry seasons result in wide seasonal variations in the river flows, with large volumes of sediment-laden water flowing during the monsoon and low volumes during the dry, winter season.

The local communities also rely on the water from these rivers for domestic and irrigation purposes, contributing to the withdrawal from the rivers.

Several major hydropower plants are being constructed along the Rivers of Punatsangchu, Mangdechu and the Nika chu, which fall on the border of the national park.

Climate

The wide elevation range and mountainous terrain create complex climatic conditions, ranging from wet subtropical in the south to cold temperate in the northern high-elevation areas. The southwest monsoon from June to September contributes most of the annual rainfall. The rain shadows imposed by the high mountain ranges result in localized rainfall gradients during this period.

=== Ecology ===
The park has a large area of relatively undisturbed natural habitats. Together with Manas Tiger Reserve and the Royal Manas National Park in the south and the Jigme Dorji National Park and Wangchuck Centennial National Park in the north, Jigme Singye Wangchuck National Park is centrally located in one of the largest, most diverse protected area complexes in Asia, with dramatically different but contiguous habitats and ecotones changing across massive altitudinal differences that rise from the low tropical to high alpine elevations.

The park includes portions of six ecoregions.
They include:

- Himalayan subtropical broadleaf forests
- Himalayan subtropical pine forests — predominant flora is a thin woodland of drought-resistant Pinus roxburghii (Chir pines).
- Eastern Himalayan broadleaf forests
1. Warm broadleaf forests
2. Cool temperate broadleaf forests
- Eastern Himalayan subalpine conifer forests.
- Eastern Himalayan alpine shrub and meadows.

=== Biodiversity ===
The wide altitudinal range, highly dissected and complex terrain, and representation of 6 ecoregions and 2 zoogeographical realms within the national park create notable biodiversity, with diverse flora and fauna species found in various ecosystems, habitats, and plant communities.

The native plants and animals include several rare and endangered species listed in Schedule 1 of the 'Forest and Nature Conservation Act of Bhutan, 1995, as implemented in the 'Forest and nature conservation Rules of Bhutan, 2006' and the IUCN Red List.

The Constitution of the Kingdom of Bhutan mandates the country to maintain at least 60% of Bhutan under forest cover for all times to come and to maintain the country as carbon neutral and a net carbon sink over time.

=== Mammals ===
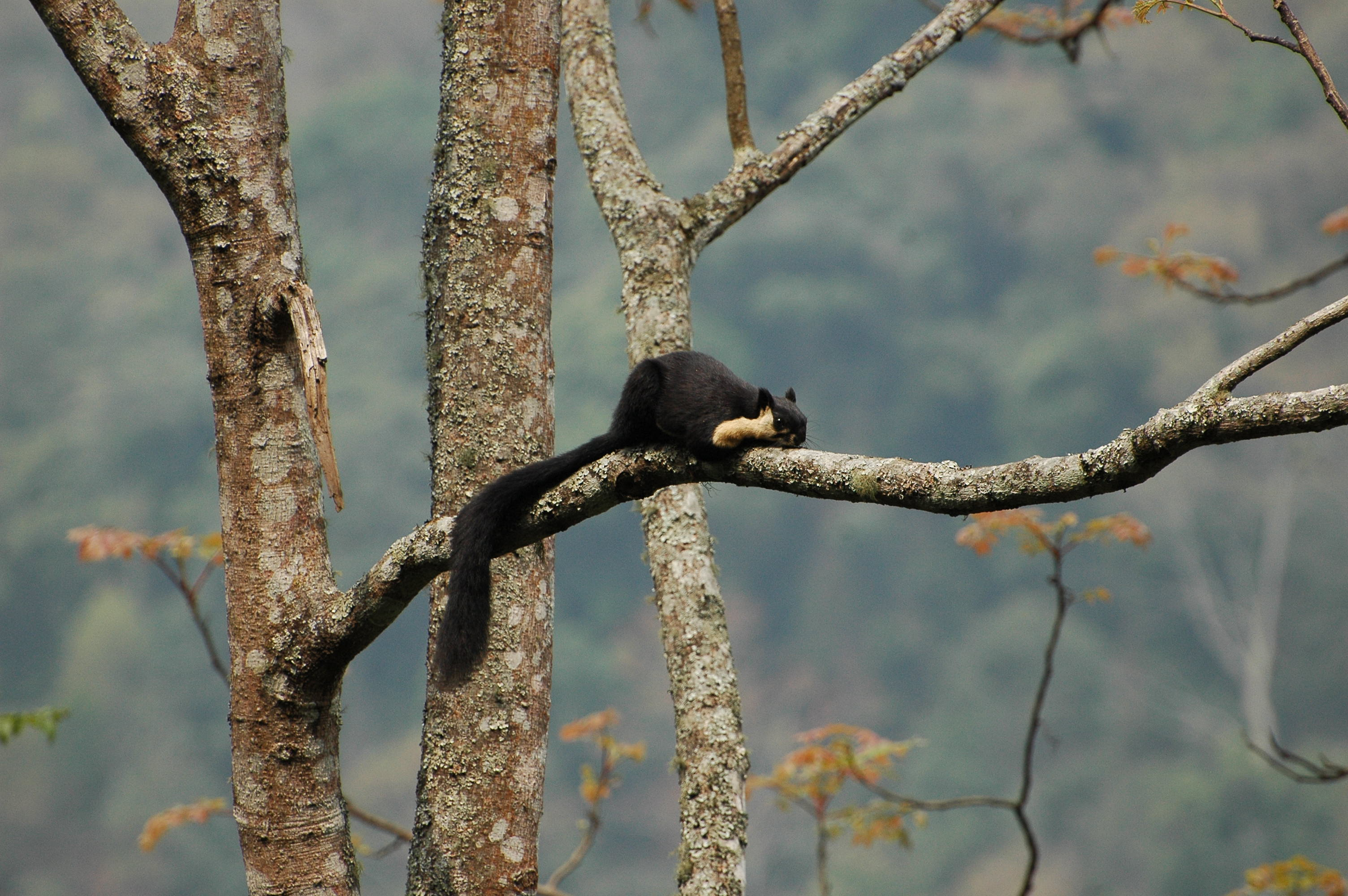
Malayan giant squirrel (Ratufa bicolor) on the way to Korphu

The mammal fauna includes a mix of Palearctic and Indo-Malayan species. The first Conservation Management Plan (Jan 2001-June 2010) for the park enlisted 57 mammals, but most of which are yet unconfirmed. The presence of 19 mammals was confirmed based on direct sightings and indirect evidence. A rapid biodiversity survey conducted in 2002 listed 22 mammals, of which 11 were identified as mammals of conservation interest. The 2012 mammal survey confirmed the presence of 26 mammals in the park. The current figure of 39 mammals was reached following intensive camera trapping conducted from 2013 to 2015 for the Tiger Revalidation Survey.

==== Mammal distribution ====
- Sub-tropical broadleaf forests

Mammal species found in this type of forest are tiger, clouded leopard, leopard, dhole, golden cat, jungle cat, leopard, gaur, muntjac, sambar, golden langur, grey langur and black giant squirrel.

- Chir pine forests

The chir pine forests are found in the southwestern and southeastern parts of the national park and are usually found in drier areas. Camera trap surveys recorded the presence of muntjac, sambar, serow, wild boar, goral, leopard, golden cat, leopard cat, dhole, yellow-throated marten and black panther

- Warm broadleaf forests

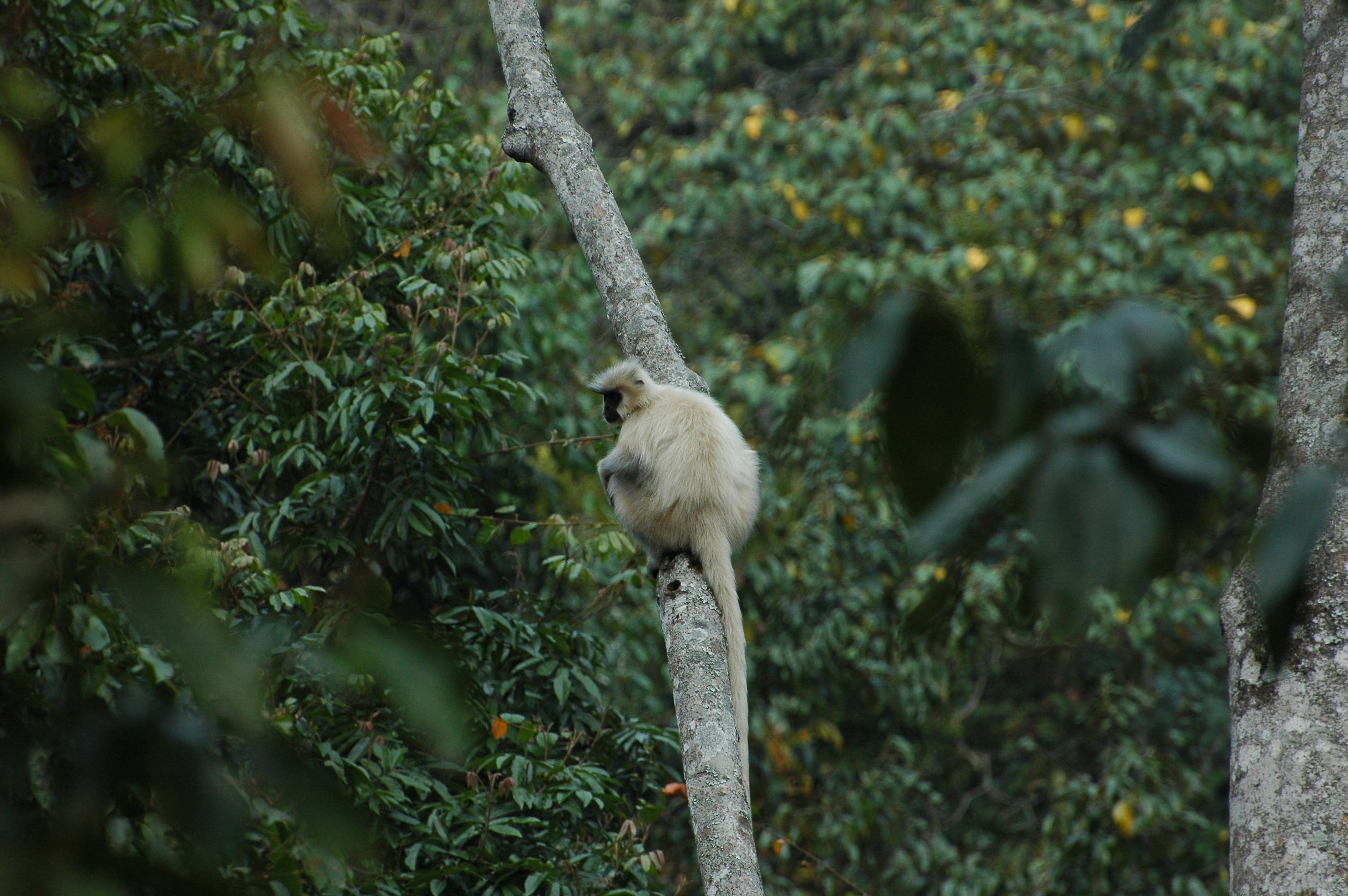
A golden langur climbing a tree at Nabji

The camera trap surveys revealed the highest number of mammal species in this habitat. A high percentage of barking deer and sambar are found in this forest type. Other mammals found in this forest type include gaur and wild boar. The endangered golden langur is also found in this type of forest.

- Cool broadleaf forests

10 species of mammals were confirmed in this forest type within the park through camera trap surveys, including the Bengal tiger, Himalayan black bear and yellow-throated marten.

- Mixed conifer forests

The mixed conifer forests, found between 2000 m and 3200 m represent a transition from the broadleaf to conifer forests. 10 species of mammals were confirmed from this forest type, including the Bengal tiger.

- Blue pine forests

Blue pine forests are predominantly found in the western part of the park between 2100 m to 3000 m. The only mammal species recorded from this forest type is the yellow-throated marten.

- Fir forests

Stands of old fir can be found on the higher ridges between 3200 m to around 4000 m. This forest type provides important habitat for the red panda, musk deer, and the Himalayan serow. Himalayan serow is one of the main prey for the Bengal tiger.

- Juniper forests

This type of forest forms the transitional zone between the treeline and the alpine meadows.

- Alpine meadows and scrub

This scrubby vegetation usually occurs above 4000 m above sea level. This type of forest is isolated from the extensive alpine habitats in, the northern areas of Bhutan. Probable mammal species found here are the Tibetan wolf.

==== Schedule I mammals recorded ====
Common name	Scientific name	FNCA-1995	IUCN
Red panda	(Ailurus fulgens)	Schedule I	Endangered
Clouded leopard	(Neofelis nebulosa)	Schedule I	Vulnerable
Leopard	(Panthera pardus)	Schedule I	Vulnerable
Leopard cat	(Prionailurus bengalensis)	Schedule I	Least Concern
Bengal tiger	(Panthera tigris tigris)	Schedule I	Endangered
Himalayan black bear	(Ursus thibetanus)	Schedule I	Vulnerable
Gaur	(Bos gaurus)	Schedule I	Vulnerable
Asian elephant	(Elephas maximus)	Schedule I	Endangered
Serow	(Capricornis thar)	Schedule I	Near Threatened
Musk deer	(Moschus leucogaster)	Schedule I	Endangered
Chinese pangolin	(Manis pantadactyla)	Schedule I	Critically Endangered
Golden langur	(Trachypithecus geei)	Schedule I	Endangered

=== Birds ===
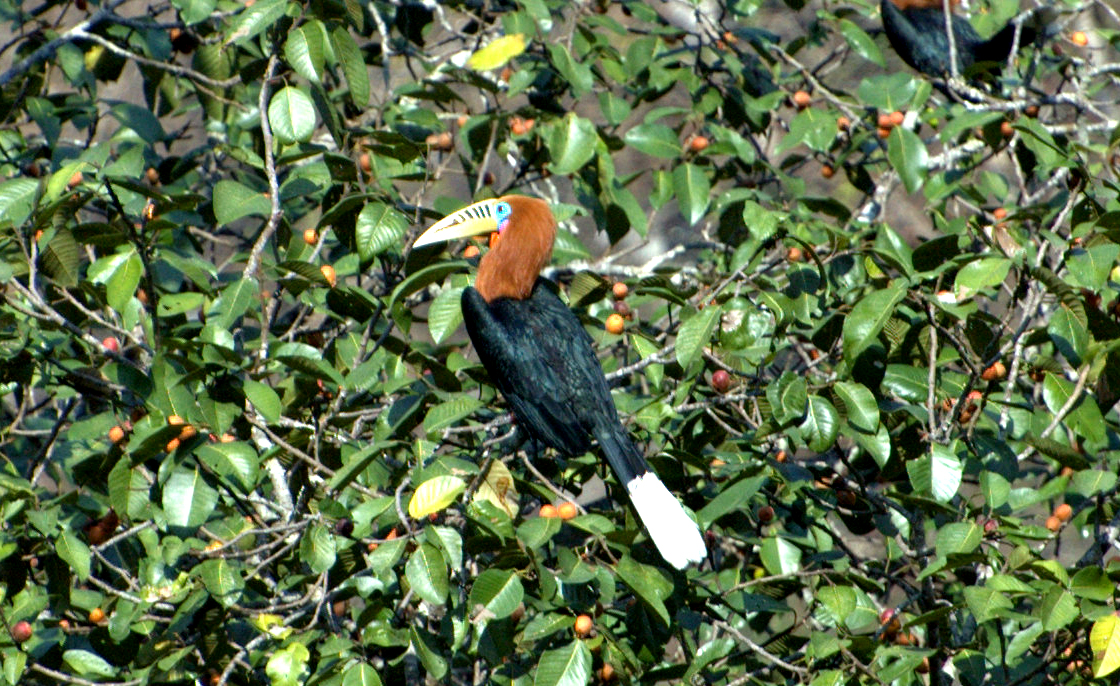
A male rufous-necked hornbill feeding at Nabji

A total of 270 bird species have been recorded in the park. Of the 270 recorded birds, eight are Globally threatened and thus fall under Schedule I of the FNCA, 1995. Phobjikha Valley, which falls in the buffer zone of the park, is also a very important winter habitat for the migrating black-necked cranes. The park is also a very important habitat of the critically endangered white-bellied herons in Bhutan. Places such as Tingtibi and Nabji-Korphu are very important habitats of the rufous-necked hornbill (Aceros nipalensis). The park is also home to the populations of the endangered great hornbill and wood snipe.

The majority of the birds recorded in the park are altitudinal migrant species that use the park as a seasonal migration route between their summer and winter habitats.

=== Herpetofauna ===
A total of 42 species of herpetofauna were recorded from the National Park. The breakdown is as follows.

- Snakes: 24 species
- Lizards: 8 species
- Frogs: 9 species
- Turtle: 1 species

=== Butterflies ===
A recent survey of the park and its buffer zones has recorded 359 species of butterflies.

== Human communities ==
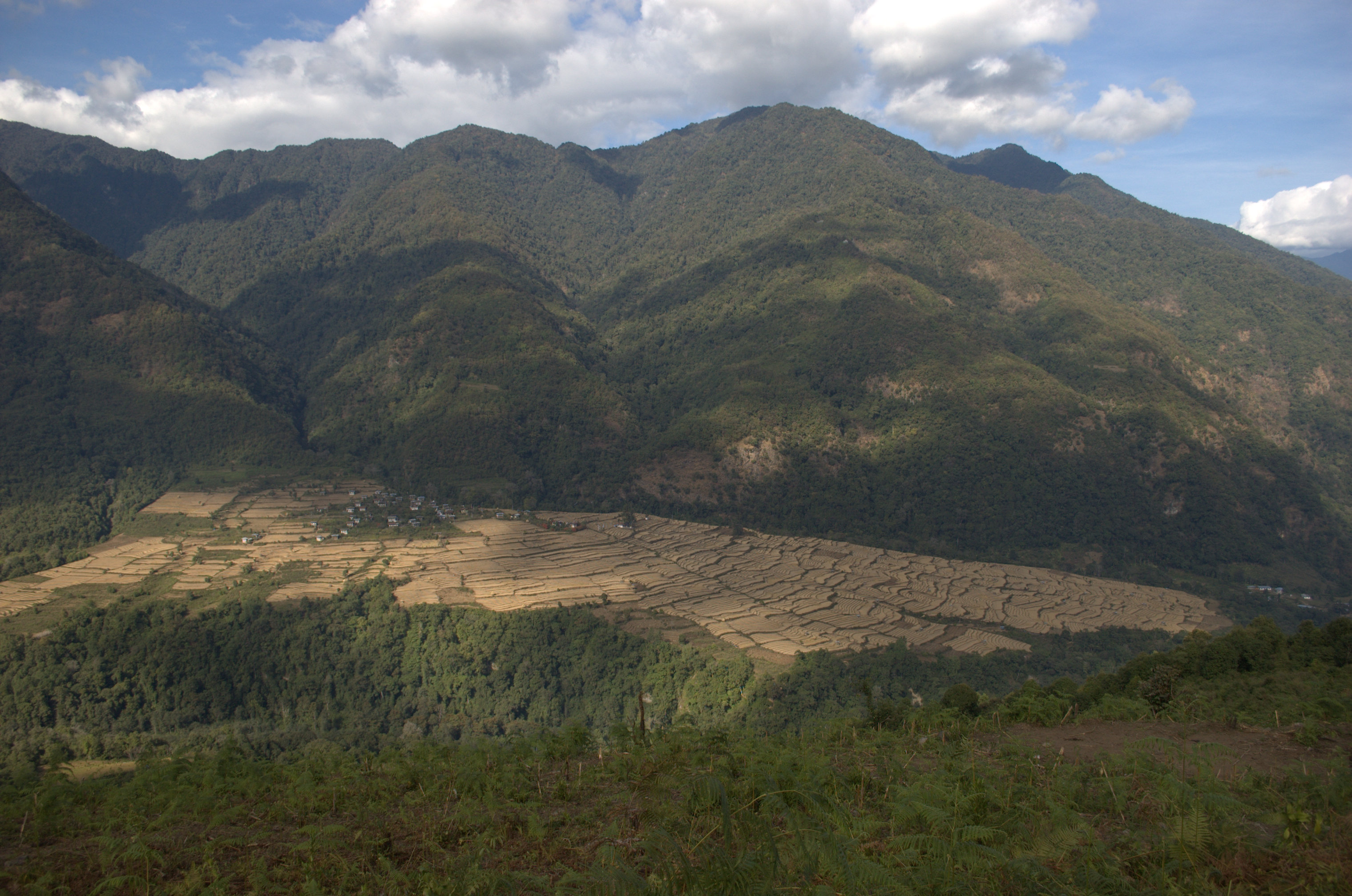
The vast paddy of Nabji and Korphu

Diversity of communities resides within the park, which includes some of the first settlers in the country, such as the Oleps in Rukha village in Athang Gewog, and the Monpa communities in Jangbi, Wangling, and Phrumzur villages in Langthil Gewog, as well as the Reti community under Jigmechhoeling Gewog, in Sarpang Dzongkhag. More than 5,000 people reside within the multiple-use park zones.

The three villages of Korphu, Nabji and Nimshong located in the Korphu Gewog have the highest number of households, whereas the settlements in Athang Gewog are small and scattered. Overall, Korphu, Trong, and Tangsibji Gewogs have a smaller number of villages, but they are larger in size, whereas Langthel and Athang Gewogs have several scattered villages. The people from these villages depend on the natural resources in the national park for their livelihoods.

The major sources of livelihood for the communities in the park are agriculture and livestock rearing, with some income from non-wood forest products. Some households also engage in labor-based wage earning, especially in the RGoB sectors. These are mostly in villages closer to towns and infrastructure project sites, where jobs are available. Casual labour is highest in Langthel, Korphu, and Athang Gewogs, whereas trade-based cash income is highest in Trong Gewog.

== Livestock rearing ==
Jigme Singye Wangchuck National Park spans over 10 Gewogs under the five political jurisdictions of five Dzongkhags. The communities within these 10 Gewogs derive their livelihoods from agriculture, cattle grazing, timber, firewood, non-wood forest products, and a variety of forest products. The park is also used as pastureland for over six months each year by a huge number of migratory cattle and yak herders.

=== Winter grazing grounds ===
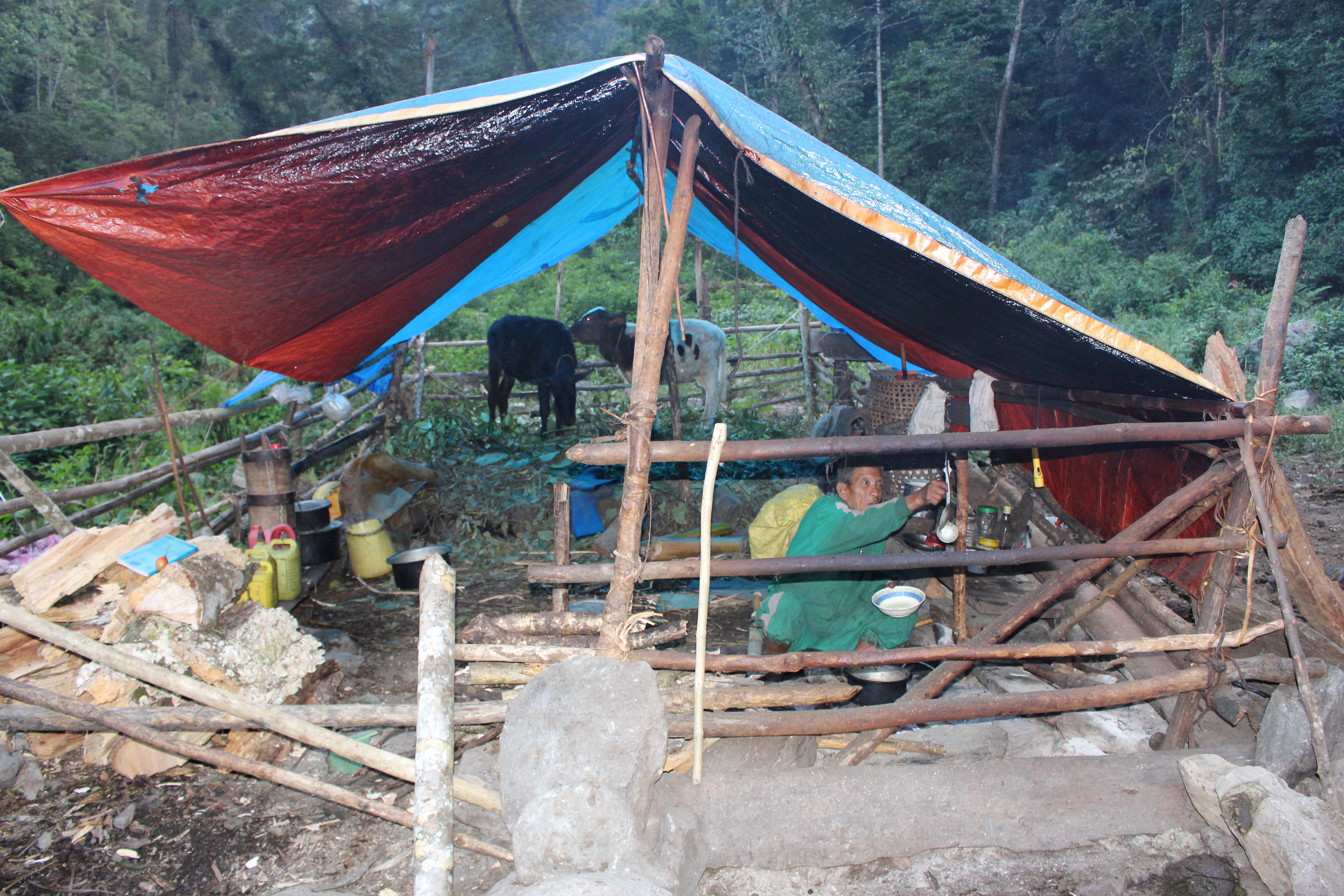
A cow herder in the winter grazing ground at Korphu

In Jigme Singye Wangchuck National Park, the winter grazing grounds are found in tropical and sub-tropical regions. Such regions are generally too hot to reside in during the summer, and the forests and meadows are infested with a diversity of weeds. The rivers swell too big that crossing from one valley to another is impossible during the summers in such areas. These areas are best suited for grazing in winter when rivers are shallow and the weather becomes moderate.

The migratory cattle herders from Chumey in Bumthang travel to these low-altitude pasturelands when the climate in the alpine and temperate regions becomes unbearable for their livestock. Many migratory herders from Bumthang own many tracts of tsamdrogs located at different vegetation zones and altitudes and allow them to migrate from one place to another with their cattle at different seasons. Cattle are moved and rotated among winter tsamdrogs very meticulously based on years of experience. The days are carefully divided for each tsamdrog to sustain the whole winter while also mitigating grazing pressure.

=== Summer grazing grounds ===
Summer grazing grounds are located in temperate and alpine regions where cattle migrate when the climate in tropical and sub-tropical regions becomes hot and humid. However, the park has less summer grazing ground.

In the Black Mountain regions, yaks from Phobjikha Valley graze in the alpine meadows during summer. The yaks migrate to the lower-altitude areas of the Phobjikha Valley during winter, when Black Mountain remains shrouded in snow.

Six yak herders from Phobjikha Valley migrate to the pastures in Black Mountain, each owning an average of 56 yaks. Over 300 yaks will likely graze in the limited pastures in rotation for around 5 months from May to September.

When cattle migrate to summer grazing grounds in temperate and sub-alpine regions, the yaks move up to higher altitudes in alpine areas. When the cattle migrate to winter grazing grounds in sub-tropical and tropical regions, the yaks move to lower altitudes in winter.

== Ecotourism ==
=== Nabji-Korphu Trek- The first Community based Nature Tourism in Bhutan ===
This is a 6-day trek that takes you to remote rural communities of Central Bhutan. Nabji-Korphu Community-Based Nature Tourism is the first of its kind in Bhutan (as opposed to conventional travel-agent organized treks/tours in Bhutan). The Nabji-Korphu trail passes through 6 rural communities. You can immerse yourself in the daily lives and farming chores of local communities while helping them conserve the environment and their cultural and historical heritage. It is a 6-day/5-night low-altitude trek. Your travel will provide rural communities with an additional source of income to supplement their livelihoods, which rely on subsistence farming.

About Nabji-Korphu Community Based Nature Tourism

Nabji-Korphu Community-Based Nature Tourism operates across six villages in the Lower Trongsa District of Central Bhutan. The trekking trail and the villages fall within Jigme Singye Wangchuck National Park. It is a 6-day/5-nights low-altitude winter trek with elevations ranging from 1000 to 1700 masl. The trek is a unique cultural and natural experience which combines rich biological diversity, rural Bhutanese communities and a medium-level trek. The trek is also of historical significance as the trail follows the route believed to have been taken by Guru Rinpoche when he visited Bhutan in the 8th century.

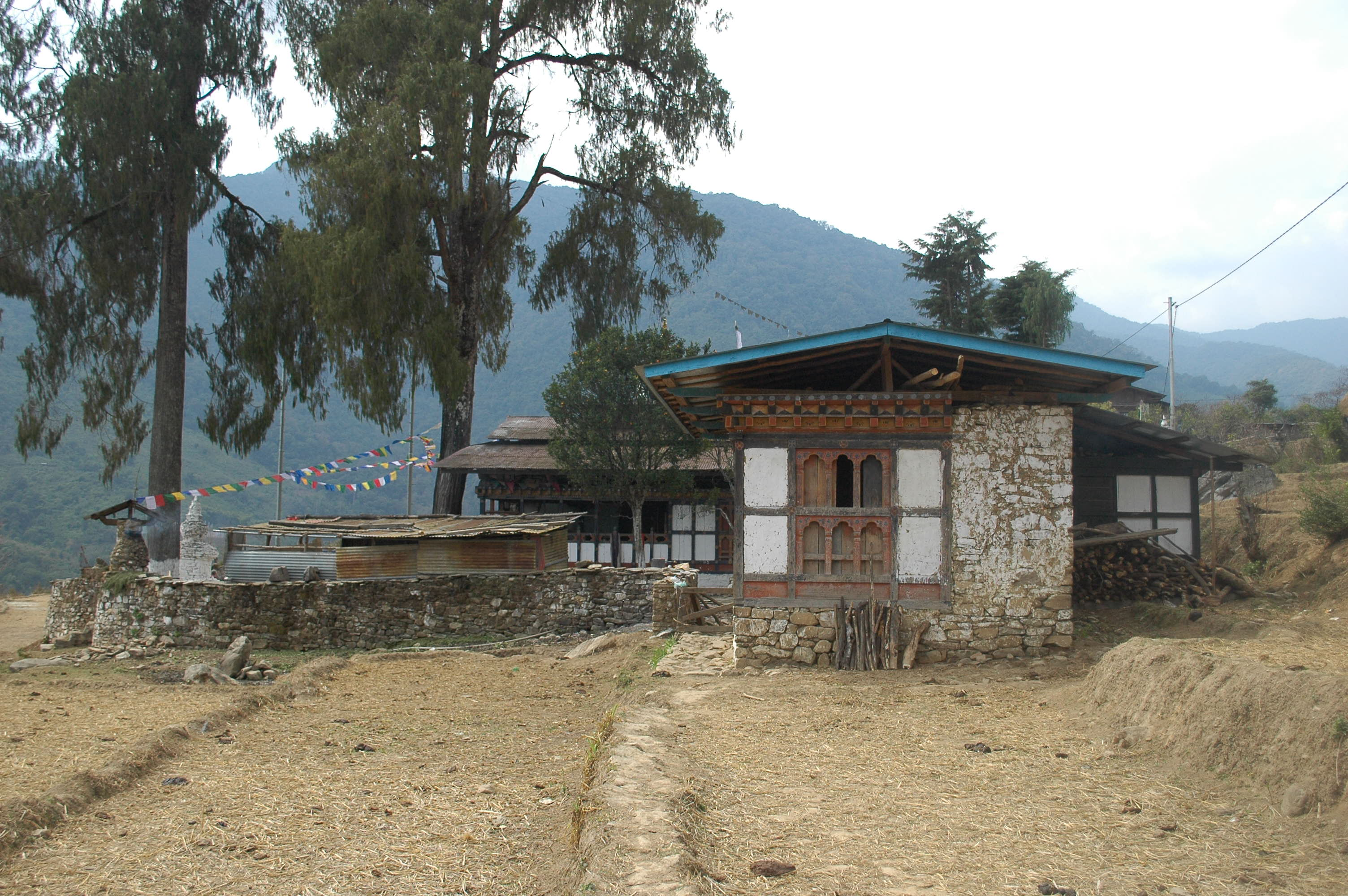
The temple of oath

Management of the Community-Based Nature Tourism

The trail has been developed in a way that allows communities to have sole responsibility for managing and providing services. Each village along the route has a village Tourism Management Committee (TCM) composed of 4-5 elected community representatives.

Attractions

The Nabji-Korphu Trail is a low-altitude winter trek open from mid-October to the end of March. The trail takes one through the home of many rare and endangered wildlife species, including the golden langur, rufous-necked hornbill and numerous wild orchids and flowering plants.

=== Adha-Rukha Community Based Tourism ===
JSWNP is initiating a 6-day/5-night Community-based nature tourism program in the western part of the National Park. The trek will run through the villages of Adha and Rukha located in Wangdue District. The highlight of the trekking is the rural people of Oleps, who speak a dying language, the habitat of the critically endangered, white-bellied heron, and the authentic rural village life, which can be experienced in the villagers' homestays. You can also try fishing in Rukha’s Hara-chhu river (the first community-managed fishing group in Bhutan) and prepare stone-dried fish.

== See also ==
- List of protected areas of Bhutan
- Wildlife in Bhutan
- Black-necked cranes in Bhutan
- Forestry in Bhutan
- List of Hot Springs and Mineral Springs of Bhutan
