= Gakiling Gewog (Sarpang) =

Gakiling Gewog དགའ་སྐྱིད་གླིང་
- Gewog
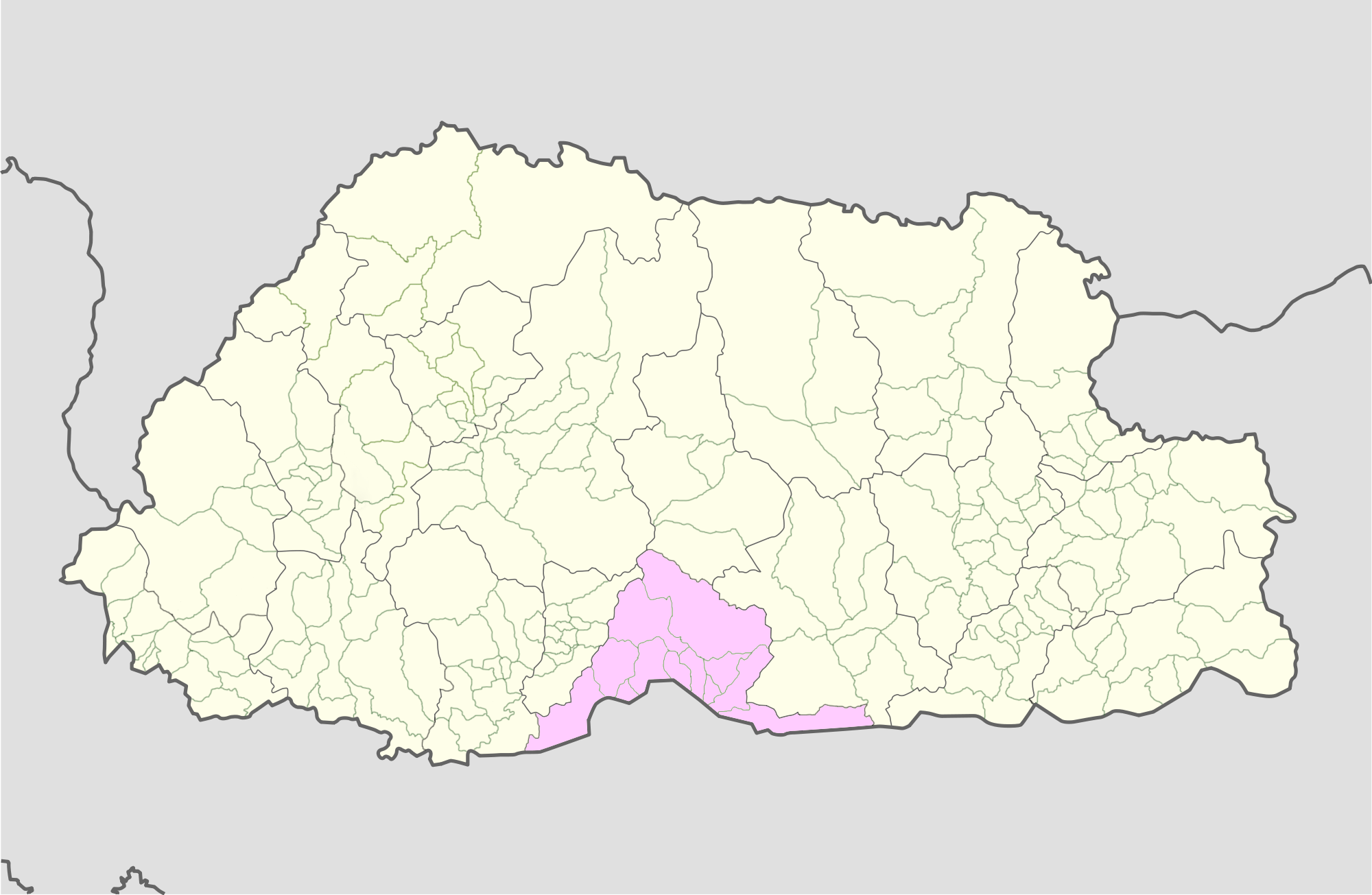
- Country: Bhutan
- District: Sarpang District
- Time zone: UTC+6 (BTT)

Gakiling Gewog (Dzongkha: དགའ་སྐྱིད་གླིང་) is a gewog (village block) of Sarpang District, Bhutan.

== Geography ==
Gambling Gewog is located in southwestern Sarpang and borders the gewogs Senggye, Shompangkha, Dekiling, and Chhudzom. It has an area of 785 square kilometers, 70% forest coverage, and a small fishery industry of 21 fishery ponds.

== Population and Demographics ==
There are 5 chiwogs (villages) in Gakiling. The gewog has a population of 2036 spread across 539 households. There are 1045 men and 991 women in Gakiling.

== Utilities and Institutions ==
In Gakiling Gewog, drinking water, electricity, and mobile network coverage are all at 100%. There is 1 outreach clinic and 25 village health workers.

=== Education ===
Gakiling has 5 schools, including 1 primary school, one ECCD (Early Childhood Care and Development) center, and 3 NFE (Non-Formal and Continuing Education) centers. Lharing Primary School has 7 teachers, including 5 men and 2 women, and 86 students.

== Farming and Industry ==
The gewog has 315 acres of cultivated wetland, 1,000 acres of cultivated dryland, 50 kilometers of irrigation channels, and 30 kilometers of electric fencing.
