= Nabji =

Nabji མནའ་སྦྱིས། Nabi
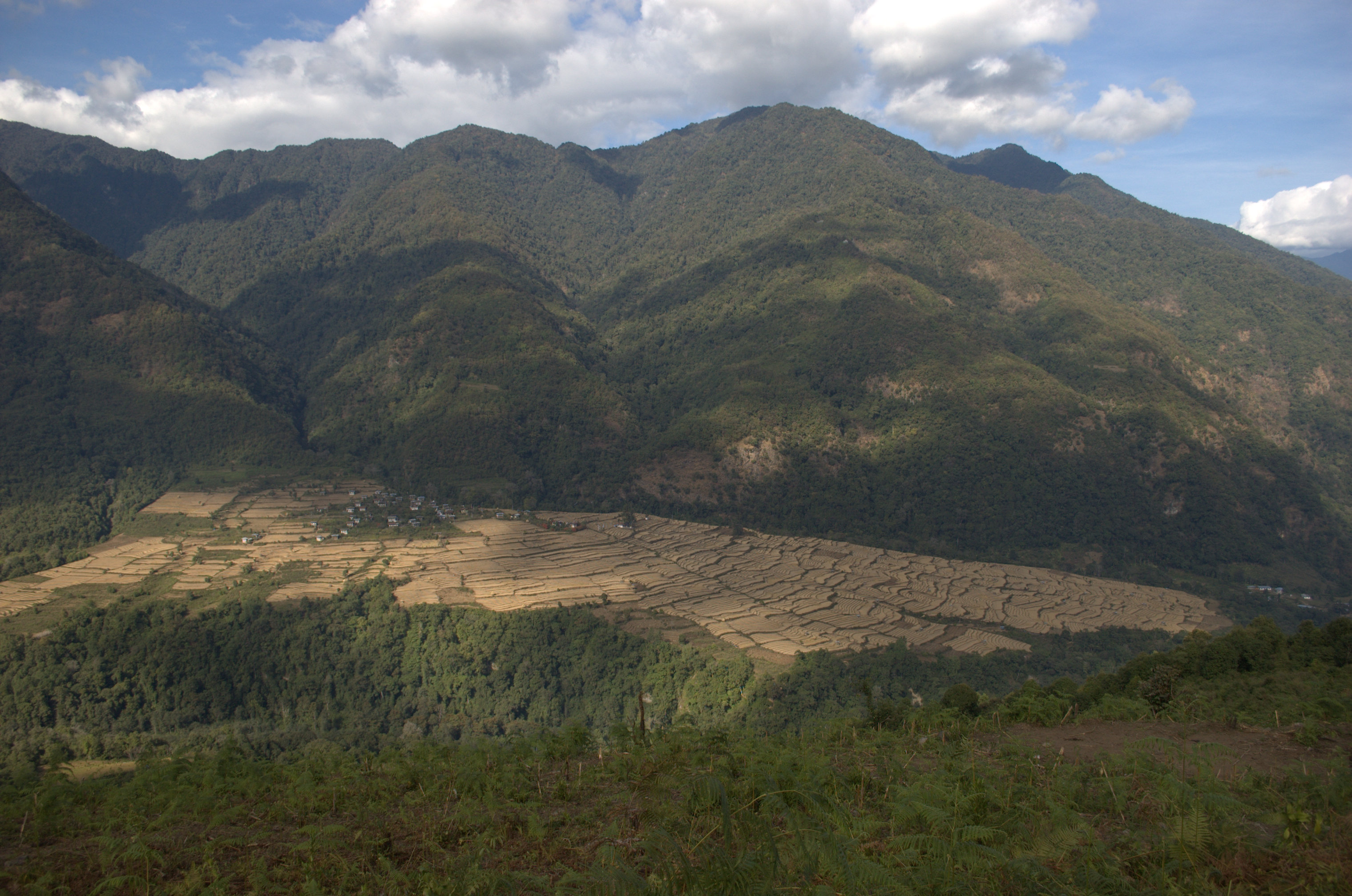
- Nabji (Nabi) village surrounded by paddy fields

- Location in Bhutan
- Coordinates: 27°11′27.73″N 90°31′3.81″E
- Country: Bhutan
- District: Trongsa District
- Village block: Korphu Gewog
- Time zone: UTC+6 (BTT)

Nabji (Dzongkha: མནའ་སྦྱིས།) is a village in Trongsa District in central Bhutan.

== Geography ==
The village sits on the south-west lap of a subsidiary mountain which originates from the Black Mountains (Bhutan) range. The village falls within the heart of the Jigme Singye Wangchuck National Park. A river which is called as Zhillingchhu flows from the southern side of the village.

== History and etymology ==
The place name "Nabji" came from Na Boe which literally means taking an oath. It is believed that in the 8th century Guru Rinpoche mediated peace between two Kings in this place and made them to take an oath to never create problems in future. A temple which stands by this name still exists in this village. Khandro Tashi Khyidren, the daughter of King Sindhu Raja built on the sacred place of Guru Rinpoche.
