= Taklai Gewog =

- Gewog
- Country: Bhutan
- District: Sarpang District
- Sub-district: Gelephu Dungkhag
- Time zone: UTC+6 (BTT)

Taklai Gewog is a former gewog (village block) of Sarpang District, Bhutan. Taklai Gewog, together with Serzhong, Bhur, and Gelephu Gewogs, belongs to Gelephu Dungkhag.
