= Umling Gewog =

Umling Gewog ཨུམ་གླིང་
- Gewog
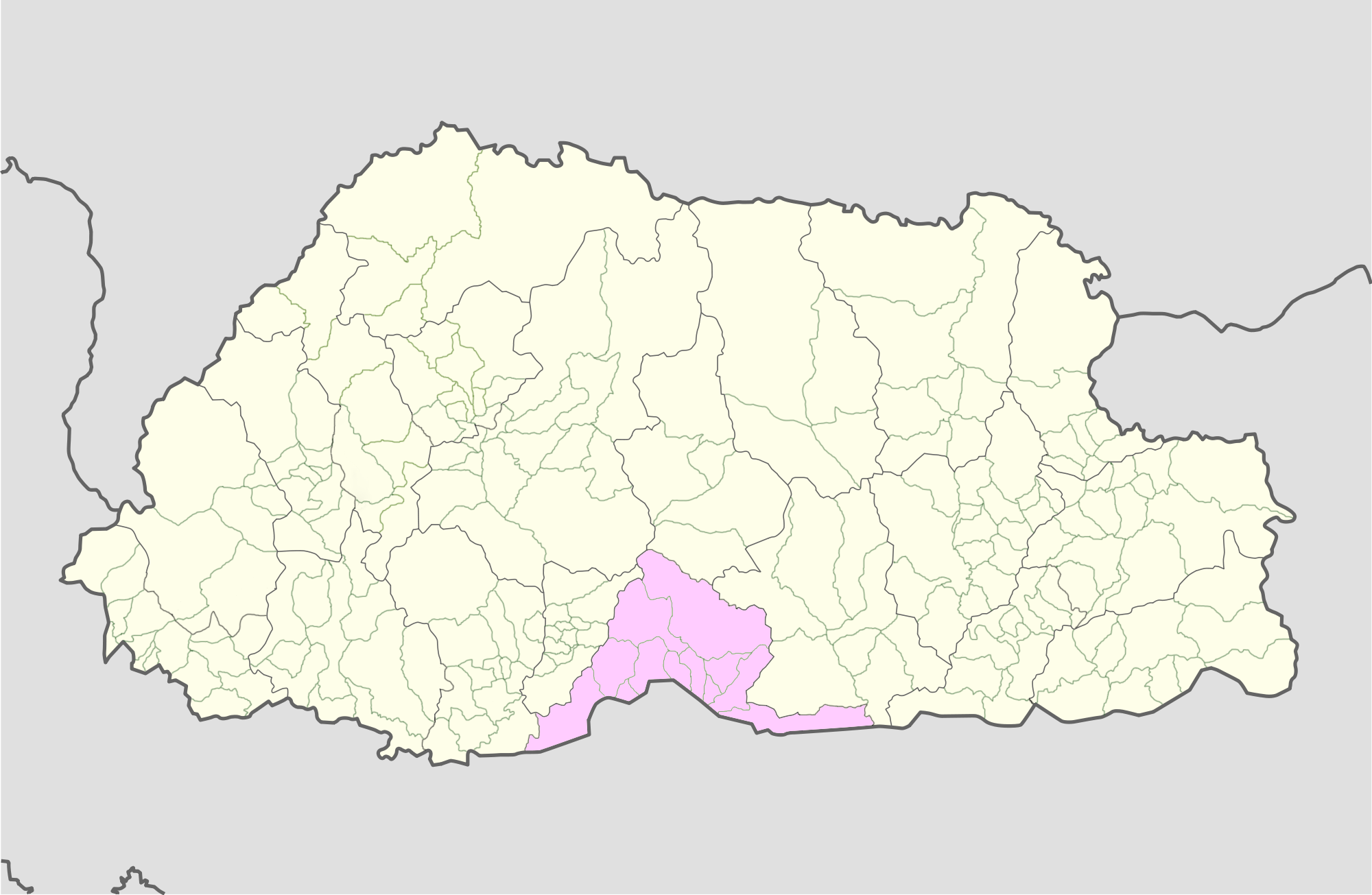
- Country: Bhutan
- District: Sarpang District

Area
  - Total: 122 km^{2} (47 sq mi)
- Elevation: 190–400 m (620–1,310 ft)

Population (2014)
  - Total: 3,129
- Time zone: UTC+6 (BTT)

Umling Gewog (Dzongkha: ཨུམ་གླིང་) is a gewog (village block) of Sarpang District, Bhutan.

Umling Gewog is situated in the central Southern foothills of Sarpang Dzongkhag, bordering Assam, India, in the South, and Chuzagang Gewog in the West, Tareythang Gewog in the East and Zhemgang Dzongkhag in the North.

Its total geographical area is approximately 122 km^{2} (47 sq mi), of which 1,480 acres (600 ha) is arable land. It has undulated terrain with an elevation ranging from 190 to 400 m (620 to 1,310 ft) above sea level. It has warm and humid climatic condition in winter and hot and rainy climatic conditions in summer.

It is approximately 33 km (21 mi) from the Dungkhag headquarters (Gelephu) and is connected with the farm road which is inaccessible in the monsoon season due to heavy downpour. It has a total population of 3129 with almost 100 percent of the people dependent upon agriculture.

Arecanut and ginger are grown as principal cash crop while paddy and maize are cultivated as main crop by the farmers. Beside farmers also rear domestic animals like cows, oxen, goats, sheep, etc. which ultimately add to their livelihood.

Until 2011 local government election, the Gewog had eight Chiwogs, namely: Chhuborthang, Daangling, Doongmin, Gaden, Lingar, Rijoog, Tashithang and Thongjazor and was merged into five Chiwogs, namely: Daangling, Doongmin, Gaden, Rijoog and Tashithang after the first LG election. The Geog is administratively headed by Gelephu Dungkhag and subsequently by Sarpang Dzongkhag.
