= Hilley Gewog =

- Gewog
- Country: Bhutan
- District: Sarpang District
- Time zone: UTC+6 (BTT)

Hilley Gewog is a former gewog (village block) of Sarpang District, Bhutan.
