= Lhamoyzingkhar =

Lhamoizingkha ལྷ་མོའི་རྫིང་ཁ
- Location in Bhutan
- Coordinates: 26°42′12″N 89°51′0″E
- Country: Bhutan
- District: Dagana District
- Sub-district: Lhamoizingkha Dungkhag
- Village block: Lhamoizingkha Gewog

Population (2017)
  - Total: 1,961

Lhamoyzingkha, formerly Kalikhola, is a border town in south-western Bhutan. It is located in Dagana District. Its the seat of Lhamoizingkha Dungkhag and host the Lhamoyzingkha Dungkhag Court.

== History ==
Lhamoyzingkha along with the wider Lhamozingkha Dungkhag would be transferred from Sarpang District to Dagana on the 26th Apirl 2007.

In 2015, the plans for the Lhamoizingkha-Sarpang Highway backed by the Asian Development Bank would be cancelled due to fears of Bodo militants. In 2025, the plans would resurface as apart of infrastructure development within Gelephu Mindfulness City as Lhamoyzingkha was designated apart of the special administrative region.

== Geography ==
Lhamoyzingkha is located at the foothills of the Himalayas at an altitude of 154 meters above sea level. The town sits between the Sankosh River to the east and the Kalikhola/Lhamoi river to the west. Bordering the Kokrajhar district to the south across the Kalikhola river.

== Demographics ==
At the 2005 census, its population was 778. At the 2017 census, its population was 1,961.

== Infrastructure ==
Lhamoyzingkha is connected by road to Phuentsholing by the Raidak-Manitar Highway, to Dagapela by the Lhamoizingkha-Dagapela Highway and by the Dalbari(Senchumthang)-Lhamoizingkha Highway.

Lhamoyzingkha Higher Secondary School, formerly Kalikhola Middle School is the only education primary to secondary institution in the town. With the school having been upgraded from a Middle school to Higher Secondary in 2023.

The town is served by a Basic Health Unit. A Shiva Mandir is located in the town, being the only Hindu structure in the Lhamoyzingkha.

The town has a branch of Bhutan Development Bank.
