= Sinphu Samten Tsemo Lhakhang =

Buddhist temple in Bhutan

Sinphu Samten Tsemo Lhakhang is a 15th-century Buddhist temple built in the Trongsa district of Bhutan.
