= Serzhong Gewog =

Sherzhong Gewog གསེར་གཞོང་
- Gewog
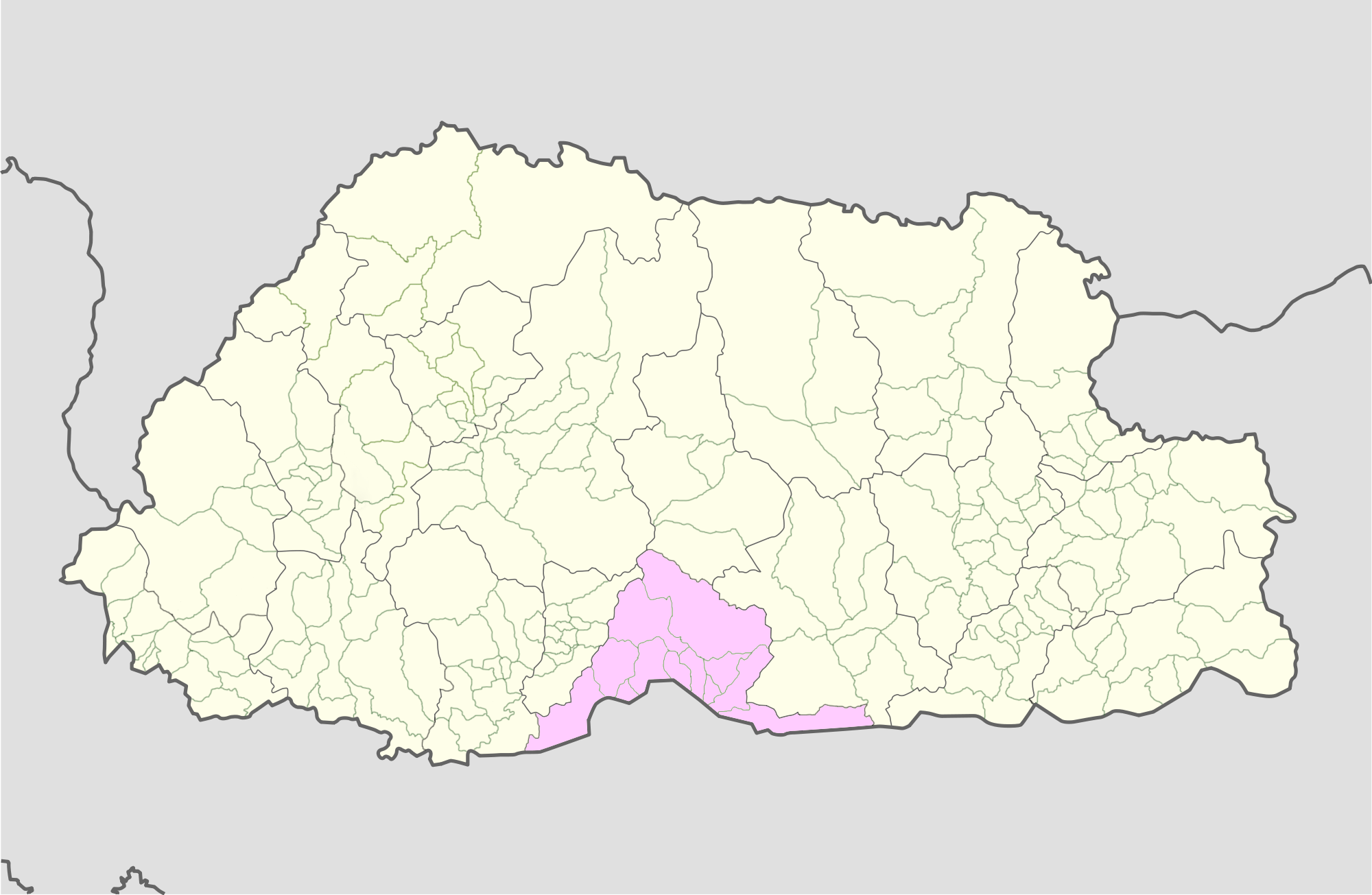
- Country: Bhutan
- District: Sarpang District
- Time zone: UTC+6 (BTT)

Sherzhong Gewog (Dzongkha: གསེར་གཞོང་) is a gewog (village block) of Sarpang District, Bhutan. Serzhong Gewog, together with Bhur, Taklai, and Gelephu Gewogs, belongs to Gelephu Dungkhag. Gelephu Tshachu is located in this Gewog.
