= Chhuzagang Gewog =

Chhuzagang Gewog ཆུ་འཛག་སྒང་
- Gewog
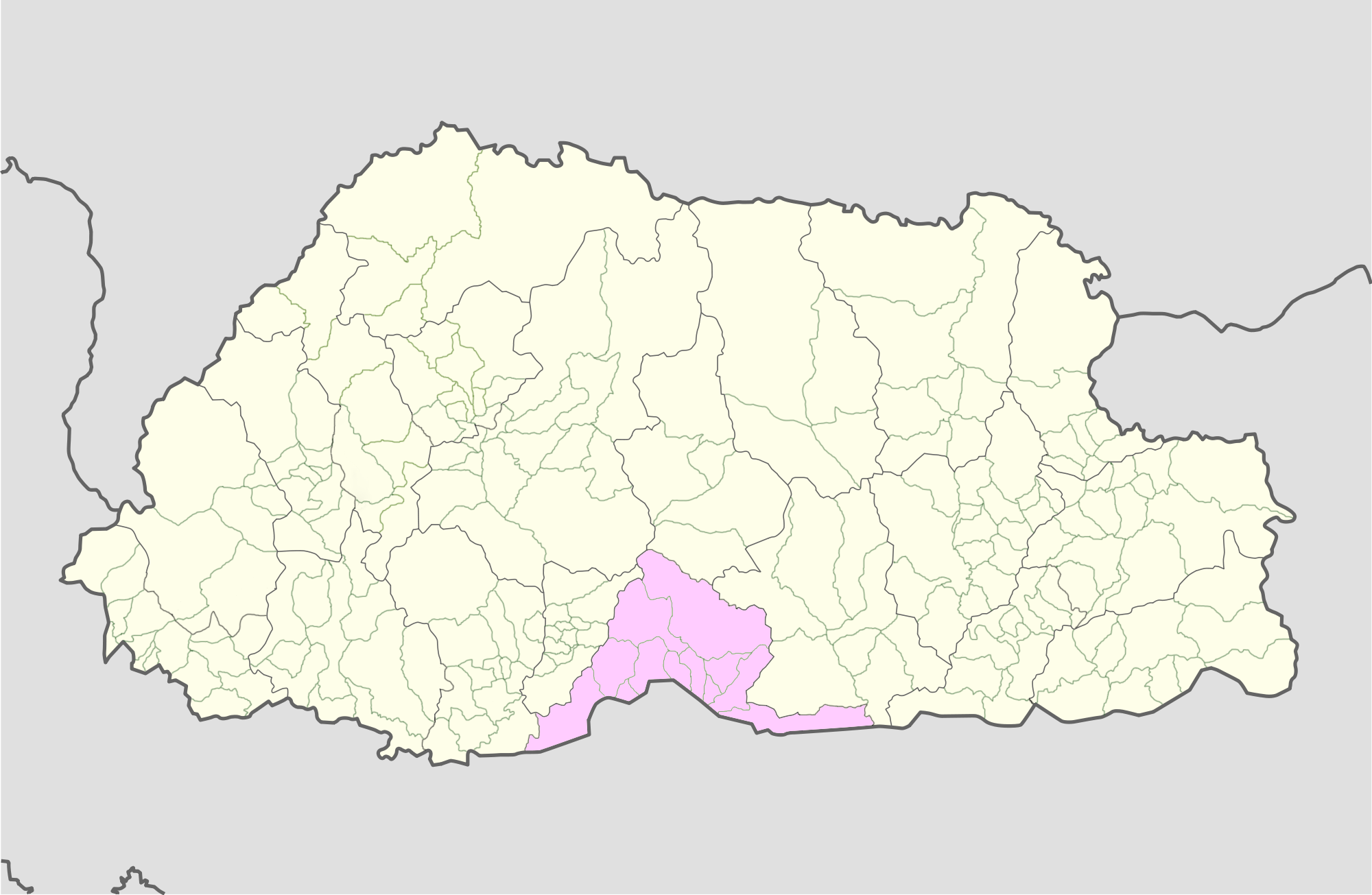
- Country: Bhutan
- District: Sarpang District
- Time zone: UTC+6 (BTT)

Chhuzagang Gewog (Dzongkha: ཆུ་འཛག་སྒང་) is a gewog (village block) of Sarpang District, Bhutan.
