= Trongsa District =

District of Bhutan

Coordinates: 27°20′N 90°25′E

Trongsa District ཀྲོང་གསར་རྫོང་ཁག།
- District
- Location of Trongsa district within Bhutan
- Country: Bhutan
- Headquarters: Trongsa

Area
  - Total: 1,807 km^{2} (698 sq mi)

Population (2017)
  - Total: 19,960
  - Density: 11.05/km^{2} (28.61/sq mi)
- Time zone: UTC+6 (BTT)
- HDI (2019): 0.615 medium · 10th
- Website: www.trongsa.gov.bt

Trongsa District (Dzongkha: ཀྲོང་གསར་རྫོང་ཁག།; Wylie transliteration: Krong-gsar rdzong-khag) is one of the districts of Bhutan. It is the most central district of Bhutan and the geographic centre of Bhutan is located within it at Trongsa Dzong.

== Languages ==
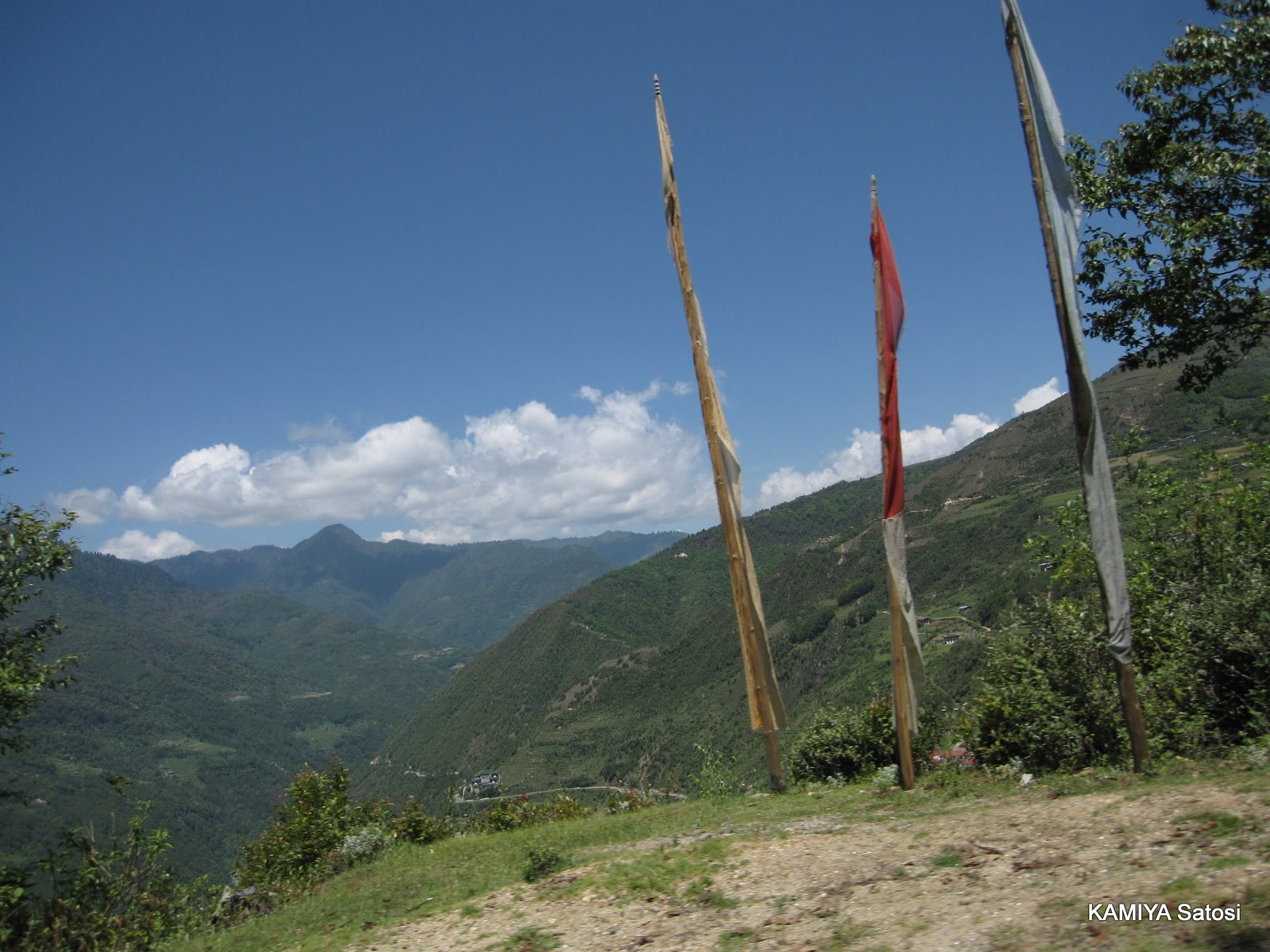
View from near Trongsa.

Trongsa is a linguistically diverse district. In the north and east inhabitants speak Bumthangkha, and in the extreme southeast Khengkha is spoken. Nyenkha is spoken in the western half of the district, straddling the border with Wangdue Phodrang District. To the north, along and across the same border, live speakers of Lakha. In the extreme south, the national language Dzongkha is spoken. Across the mid-south, tiny communities of autochthonous 'Olekha (Black Mountain Monpa) speakers have all but disappeared.

Historically, Bumthangkha and its speakers have had close contact with speakers of Kurtöpkha, Mangduepikha and Khengkha, nearby languages of central and eastern Bhutan, to the extent that they may be considered part of a wider collection of "Bumthang languages." Nyenkha, also related to the Bumthang languages, is more divergent while 'Olekha is only distantly related.

== Geography ==
Trongsa covers a total area of 1807 sq km. It is bordered by Wangdue Phodrang District to the west and Bumthang District to the east. To the south it borders Tsirang, Sarpang, and Zhemgang Districts.

== Administrative divisions ==
Trongsa District is divided into five village blocks (or gewogs):

- Dragteng Gewog
- Korphu Gewog
- Langthil Gewog
- Nubi Gewog
- Tangsibji Gewog

== Environment ==
Most of Trongsa District is environmentally protected. Wangchuck Centennial Park in the north (the gewog of Nubi) and Jigme Singye Wangchuck National Park in central, western, and southern Trongsa (the gewogs of Langthil and Tangsibji) are connected by biological corridors, all of which are protected areas of Bhutan. Biological corridors also occupy substantial portions of the southeast and northeast, leading to Thrumshingla National Park in neighboring districts. Jigme Singye Wangchuck National Park preserves some of Bhutan's wildlife such as the Himalayan Bear and White Langur.

== Cultural ==
- Yudrung Choeling Dzong
- Mebar Lhakhang, Rephel
- Sa Nga Choeling Lhakhang, Taktse
- Nabji Lhakhang is a one-storied traditional Bhutanese temple built by Khandro Tashi Khyidren at the site of Guru Rinpoche in Nabji Village.
- Guru Lhakhang, Sinphu
- Ugyen Dargay Choeling, Nyala
- Langthil Lhakhang
- Tsheringma Drupchhu is a Holy Spring water in Trongsa believed to produce Melodious Voices and live Long Life if one drinks it.

== Climate ==
Climate data for Trongsa, elevation 2,120 m (6,960 ft), (1996–2017 normals, extremes 2003–2017)
Month	Jan	Feb	Mar	Apr	May	Jun	Jul	Aug	Sep	Oct	Nov	Dec	Year
Record high °C (°F)	21.5 (70.7)	22.0 (71.6)	28.0 (82.4)	27.0 (80.6)	28.0 (82.4)	31.0 (87.8)	31.0 (87.8)	31.0 (87.8)	30.0 (86.0)	28.0 (82.4)	24.0 (75.2)	23.0 (73.4)	31.0 (87.8)
Mean daily maximum °C (°F)	15.2 (59.4)	16.9 (62.4)	19.7 (67.5)	21.4 (70.5)	22.3 (72.1)	23.4 (74.1)	24.1 (75.4)	24.7 (76.5)	23.7 (74.7)	21.6 (70.9)	18.6 (65.5)	16.5 (61.7)	20.7 (69.2)
Daily mean °C (°F)	9.3 (48.7)	10.9 (51.6)	14.0 (57.2)	16.3 (61.3)	17.7 (63.9)	19.8 (67.6)	20.6 (69.1)	20.8 (69.4)	19.8 (67.6)	16.7 (62.1)	13.1 (55.6)	10.8 (51.4)	15.8 (60.5)
Mean daily minimum °C (°F)	3.4 (38.1)	4.8 (40.6)	8.2 (46.8)	11.2 (52.2)	13.0 (55.4)	16.1 (61.0)	17.1 (62.8)	16.9 (62.4)	15.8 (60.4)	11.7 (53.1)	7.6 (45.7)	5.0 (41.0)	10.9 (51.6)
Record low °C (°F)	−4.0 (24.8)	−3.0 (26.6)	0.5 (32.9)	3.0 (37.4)	6.0 (42.8)	9.0 (48.2)	11.0 (51.8)	11.5 (52.7)	9.0 (48.2)	3.5 (38.3)	0.5 (32.9)	−2.5 (27.5)	−4.0 (24.8)
Average rainfall mm (inches)	9.5 (0.37)	15.3 (0.60)	52.2 (2.06)	104.8 (4.13)	152.3 (6.00)	194.9 (7.67)	257.6 (10.14)	235.6 (9.28)	151.7 (5.97)	73.9 (2.91)	11.9 (0.47)	6.5 (0.26)	1,266.2 (49.86)
Average relative humidity (%)	76.5	76.9	76.9	78.7	80.8	86.1	86.0	84.5	86.2	81.5	77.2	76.8	80.7
Source: National Center for Hydrology and Meteorology

== See also ==
- Districts of Bhutan
- Trongsa Province
