= Senghe Gewog =

Senggey Gewog སེ་ངྒེ་
- Gewog
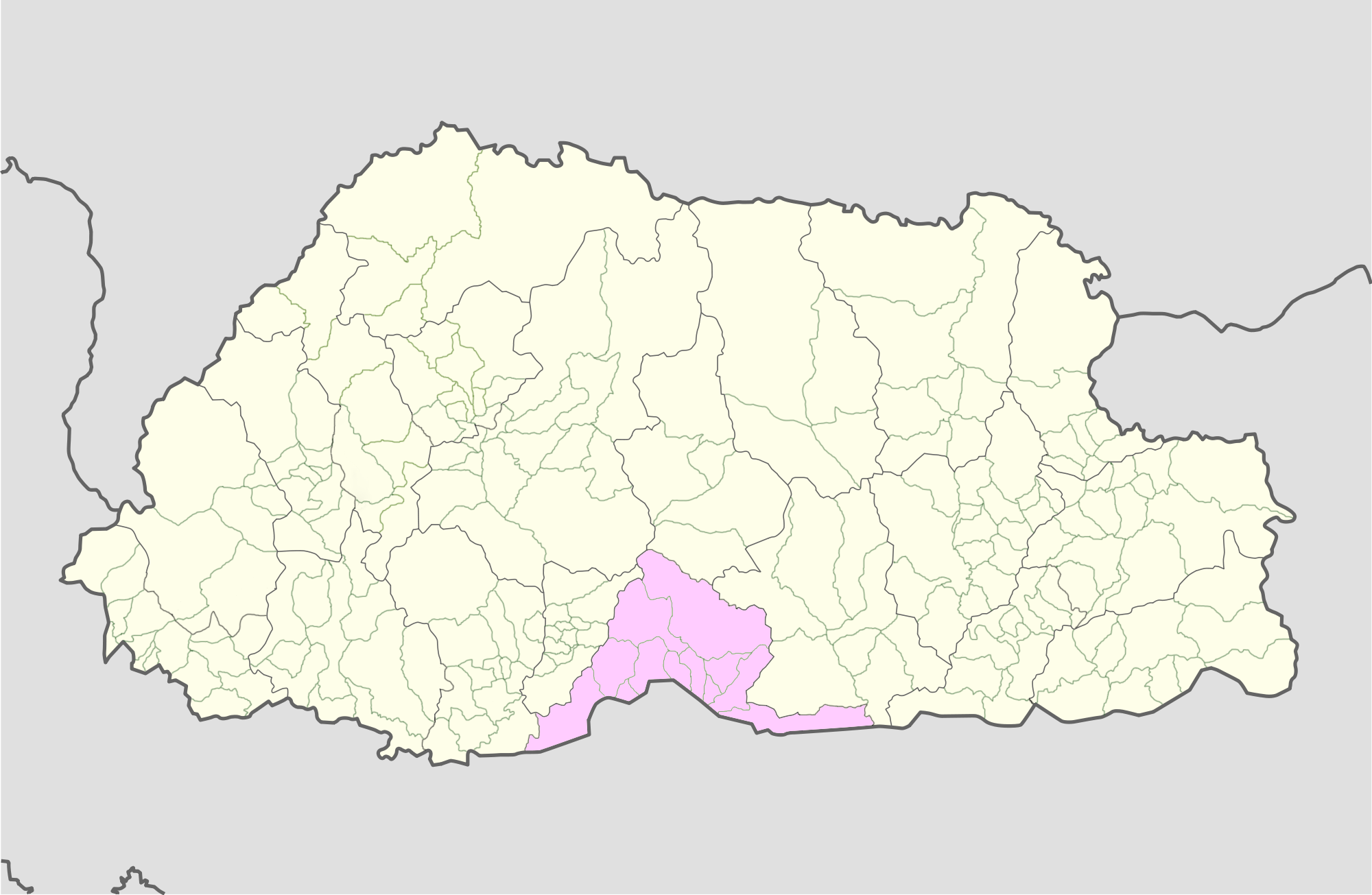
- Country: Bhutan
- District: Sarpang District
- Time zone: UTC+6 (BTT)

Senggey Gewog (Dzongkha: སེ་ངྒེ་) is a gewog (village block) of Sarpang District, Bhutan.
