= Dragteng Gewog =

Drateng Gewog བྲག་སྟེང་
- Gewog
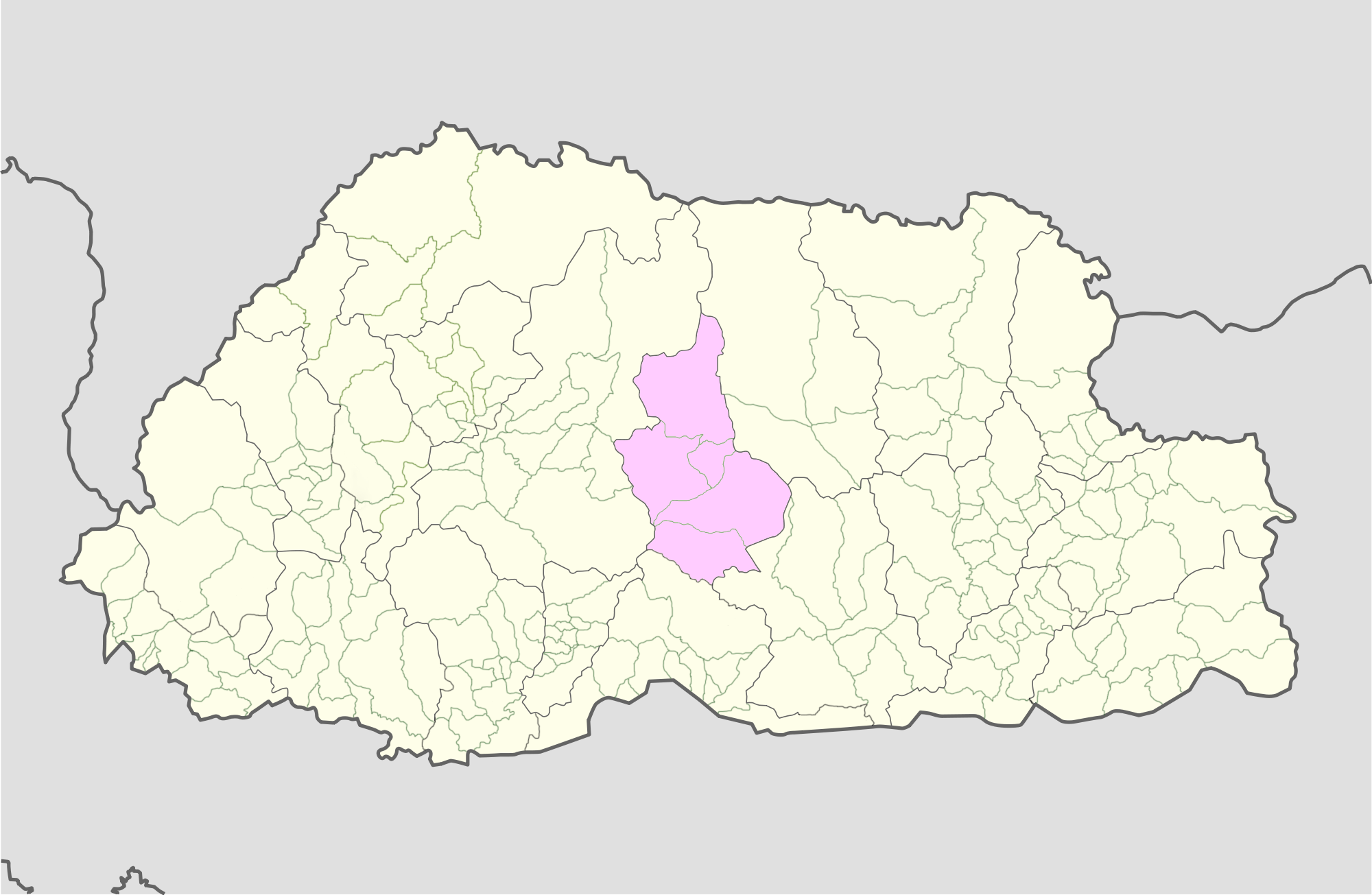
- Country: Bhutan
- District: Trongsa District
- Time zone: UTC+6 (BTT)

Dragteng Gewog (Dzongkha: བྲག་སྟེང་) is a gewog (village block) of Trongsa District, Bhutan.
