= Nubi Gewog =

Nubi Gewog ནུ་སྦིས་
- Gewog
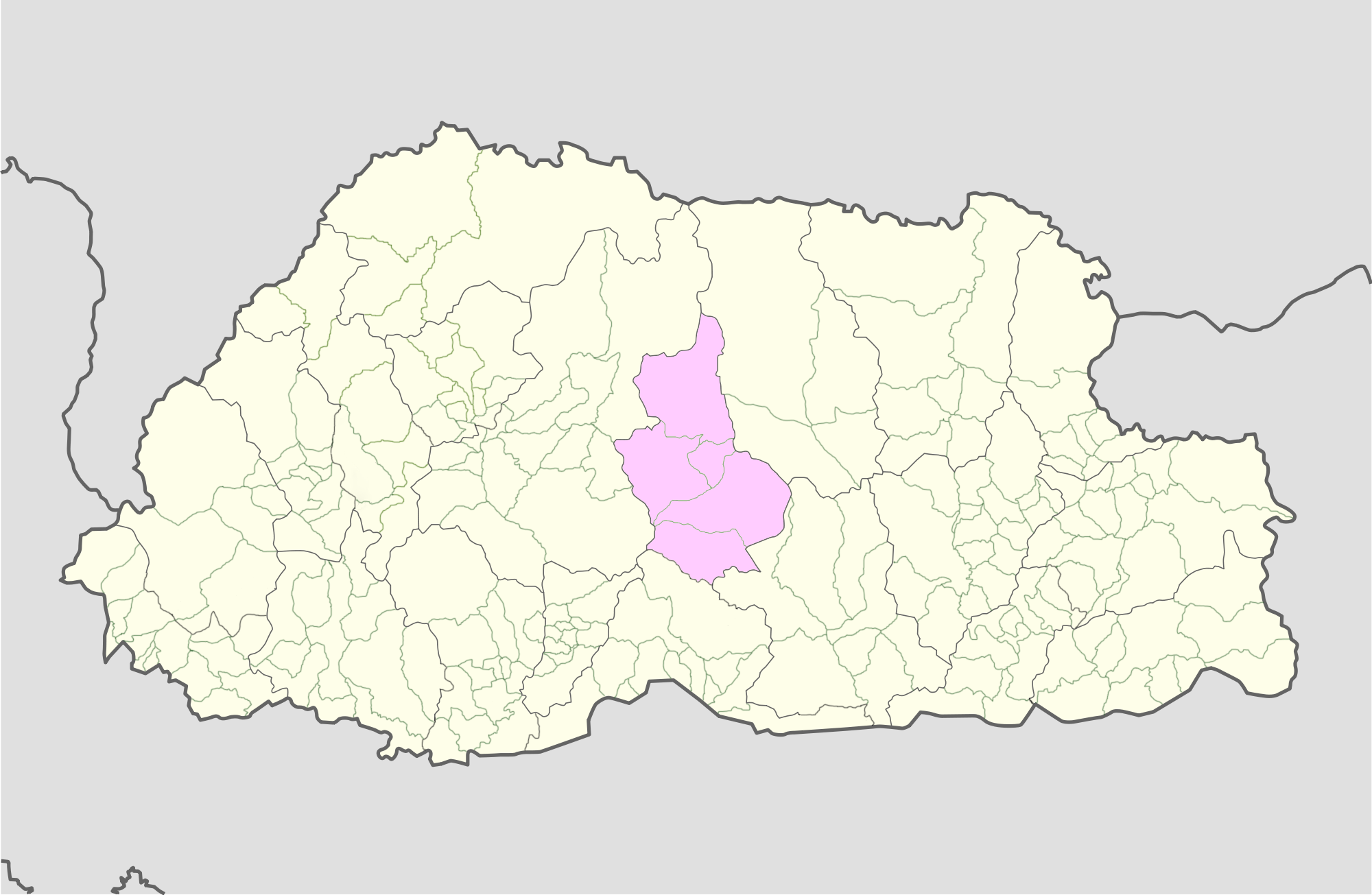
- Country: Bhutan
- District: Trongsa District

Government
  - Type: Every gewog is administered by a Gewog Tshogde (gewog council), subordinate to the Dzongkhag Tshogdu (district council).

Area
  - Total: 554.4 km^{2} (214.1 sq mi)
- Time zone: UTC+6 (BTT)

Nubi Gewog (Dzongkha: ནུ་སྦིས་) is a gewog (village block) of Trongsa District, Bhutan.
