= Tareythang Gewog =

Tareythang Gewog རྟ་རས་ཐང་
- Gewog
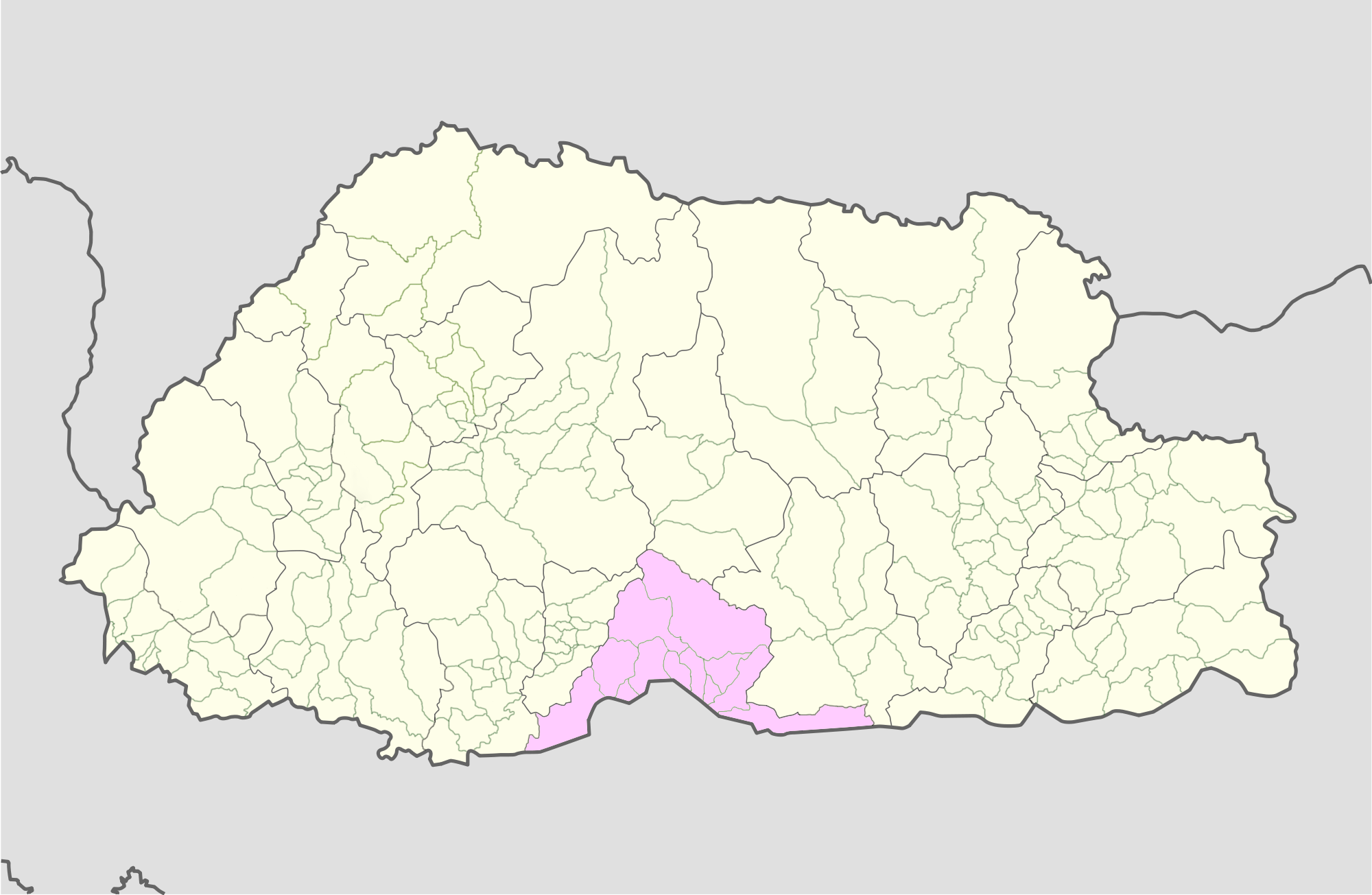
- Country: Bhutan
- District: Sarpang District
- Time zone: UTC+6 (BTT)

Tareythang Gewog (Dzongkha: རྟ་རས་ཐང་) is a gewog (village block) of Sarpang District, Bhutan.
