= Gelephu Gewog =

Gelephu Gewog དགེ་ལེགས་ཕུ་
- Gewog
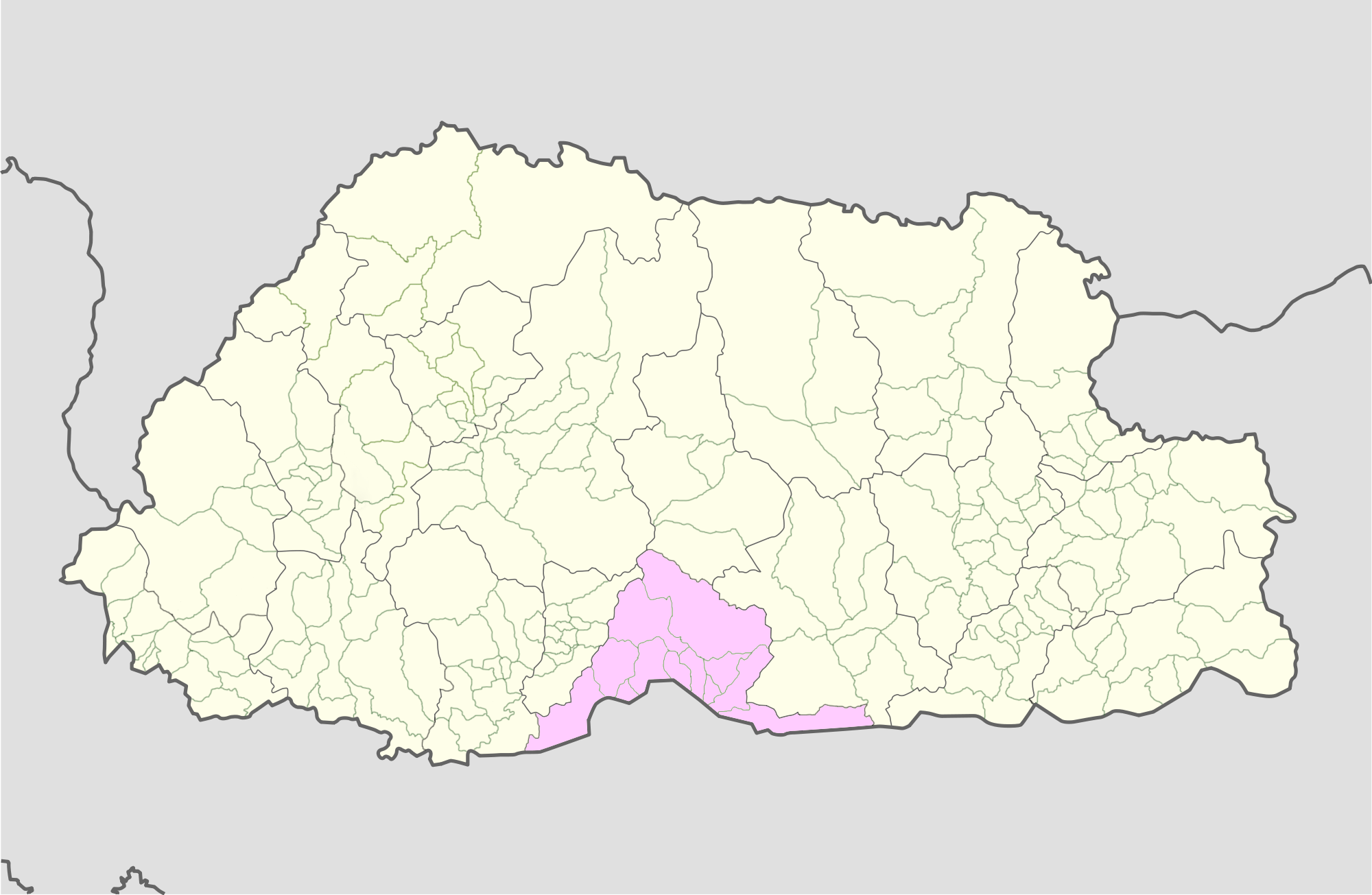
- Country: Bhutan
- District: Sarpang District
- Time zone: UTC+6 (BTT)

Gelephu Gewog (Dzongkha: དགེ་ལེགས་ཕུ་) is a gewog (village block) of Sarpang District, Bhutan. Gelephu Gewog, together with Serzhong, Taklai, and Bhur Gewogs, belongs to Gelephu Dungkhag.
