= Deorali Gewog =

- Gewog
- Country: Bhutan
- District: Dagana District
- Sub-district: Lhamoy Zingkha Dungkhag
- Time zone: UTC+6 (BTT)

Deorali Gewog is a former gewog (village block) of Dagana District, Bhutan. It also comprises part of Lhamoy Zingkha Dungkhag, along with Lhamoy Zingkha and Nichula Gewogs.

In 2007, Lhamoy Zingkha Dungkhag was formally transferred from Sarpang Dzongkhag to Dagana Dzongkhag, affecting the town of Lhamozingkha and three constituent gewogs – Lhamozingkha, Deorali and Nichula (Zinchula) – that formed the westernmost part of Sarpang and became the southernmost part of Dagana.
