= Langthil Gewog =

Langthil Gewog གླང་མཐིལ་
- Gewog
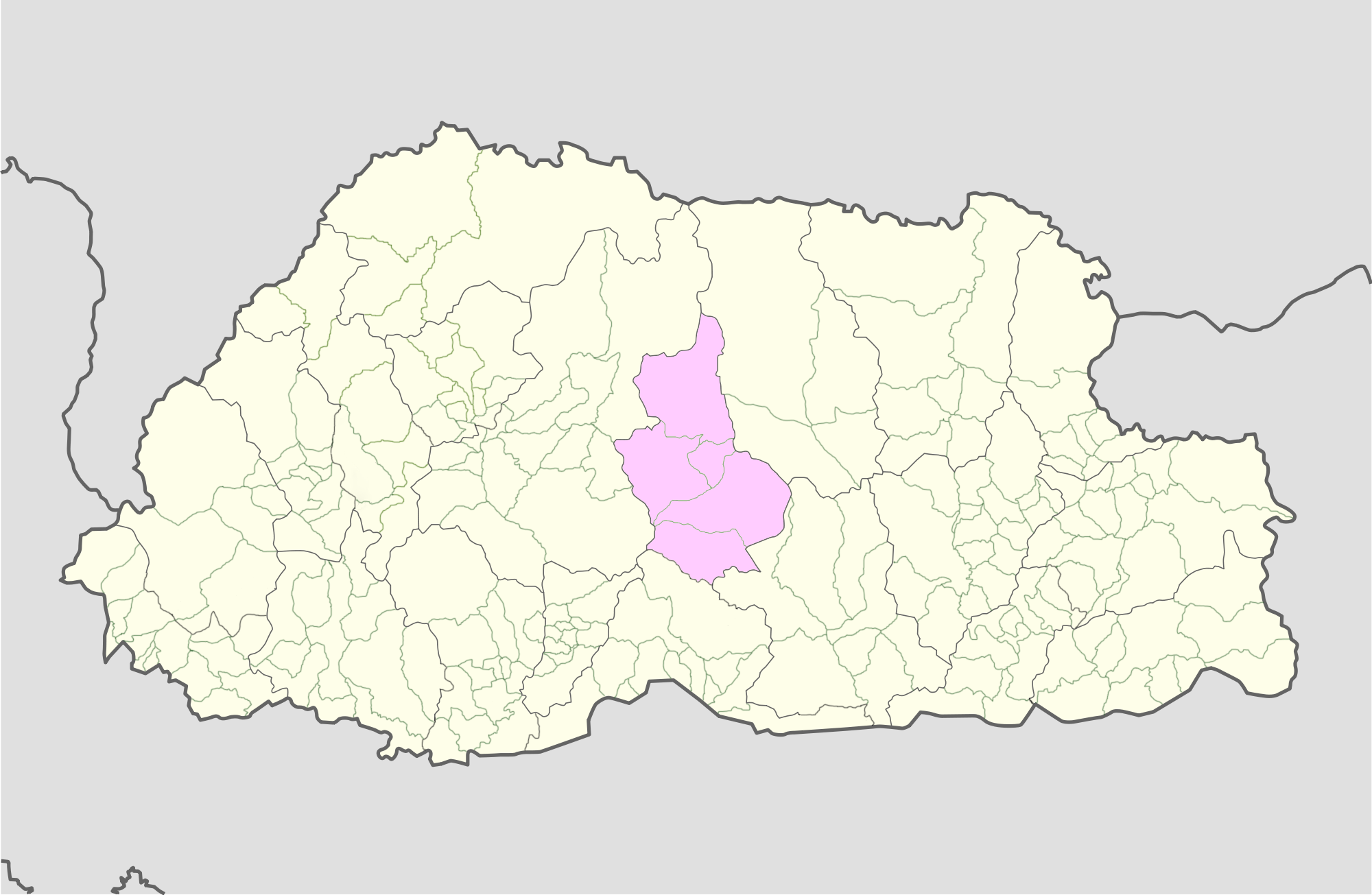
- Country: Bhutan
- District: Trongsa District
- Time zone: UTC+6 (BTT)

Langthil Gewog (Dzongkha: གླང་མཐིལ་) is a gewog (village block) of Trongsa District, Bhutan.
