= Tangsibji Gewog =

Tangsibji Gewog སྟང་སི་སྦྱིས་
- Gewog
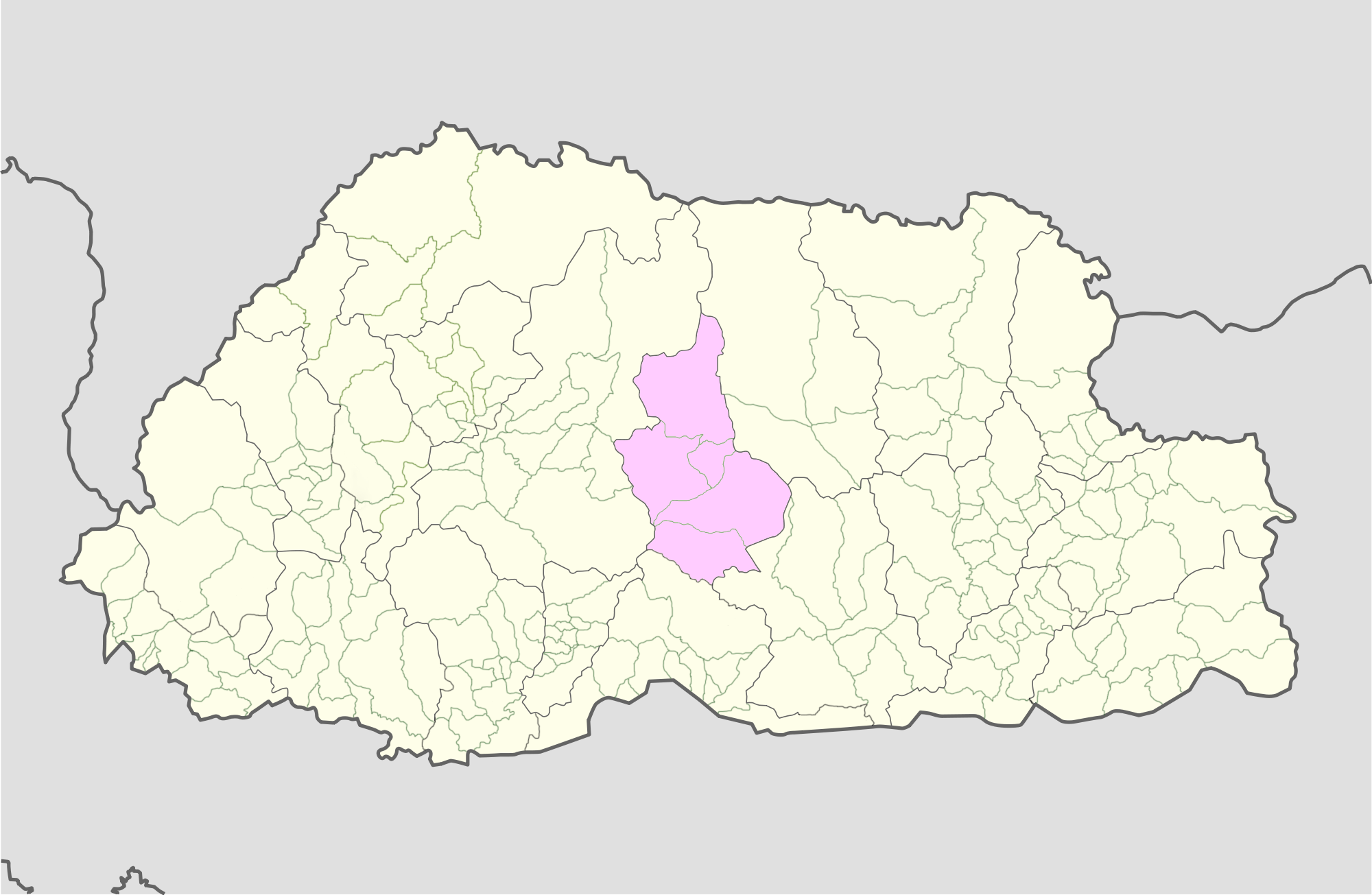
- Country: Bhutan
- District: Trongsa District
- Time zone: UTC+6 (BTT)

Tangsibji Gewog (Dzongkha: སྟང་སི་སྦྱིས་) is a gewog (village block) of Trongsa District, Bhutan.
