= Sarpang =

Sarpang Shompangka, Sarpangtar
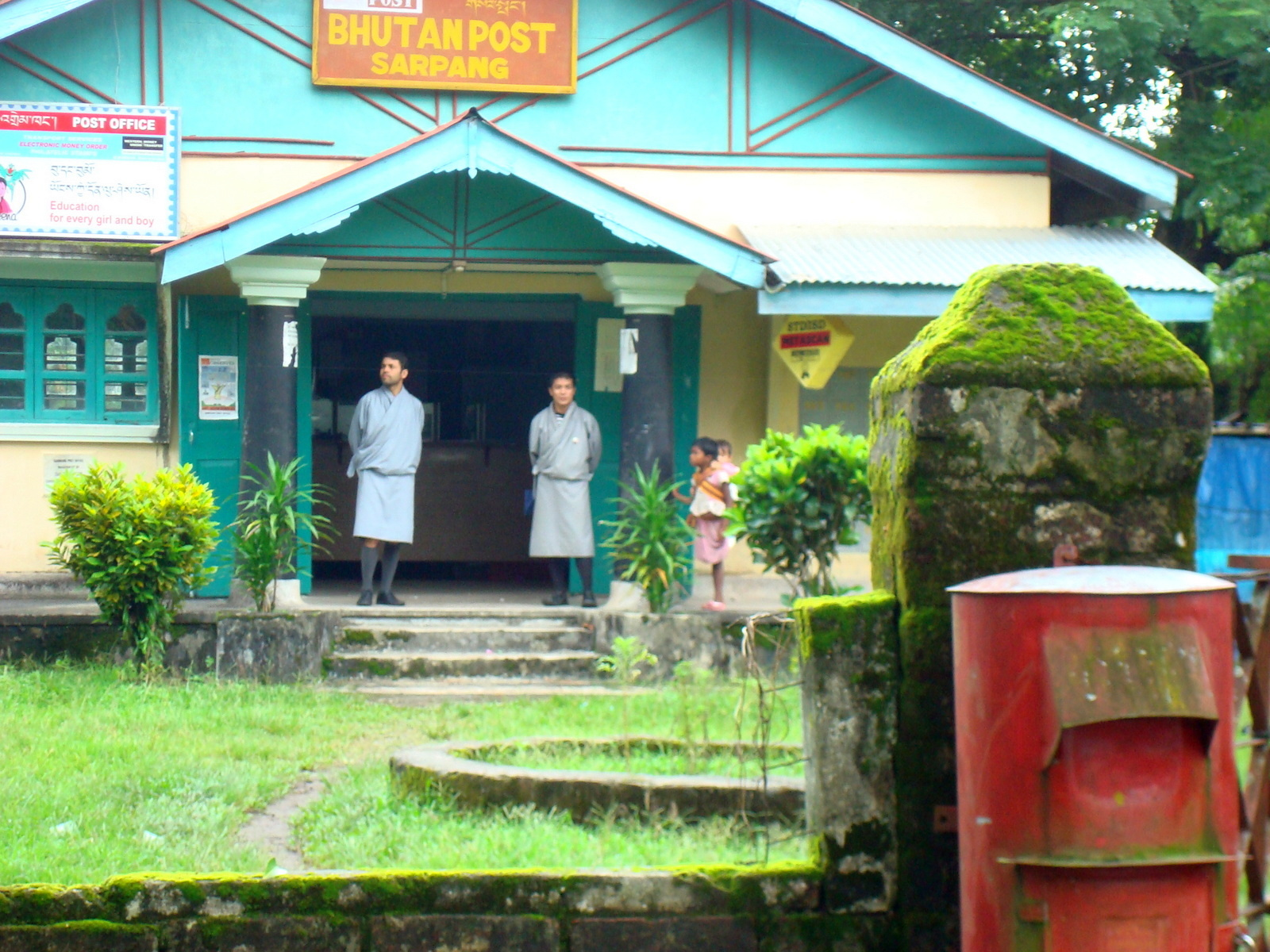
- Post office in Sarpang

- Location in Bhutan
- Coordinates: 26°52′N 90°16′E
- Country: Bhutan
- District: Sarpang District
- Village block: Shompangkha Gewog
- Elevation: 369 m (1,211 ft)

Population (2012)
  - Total: 10,416
- Time zone: UTC+6 (BTT)

Sarpang, also transliterated as Sarbhang or Sarbang, is a thromde or town in Sarpang District in southern Bhutan.
