= Chhudzom Gewog =

Chhudzom Gewog ཆུ་འཛོམས་
- Gewog
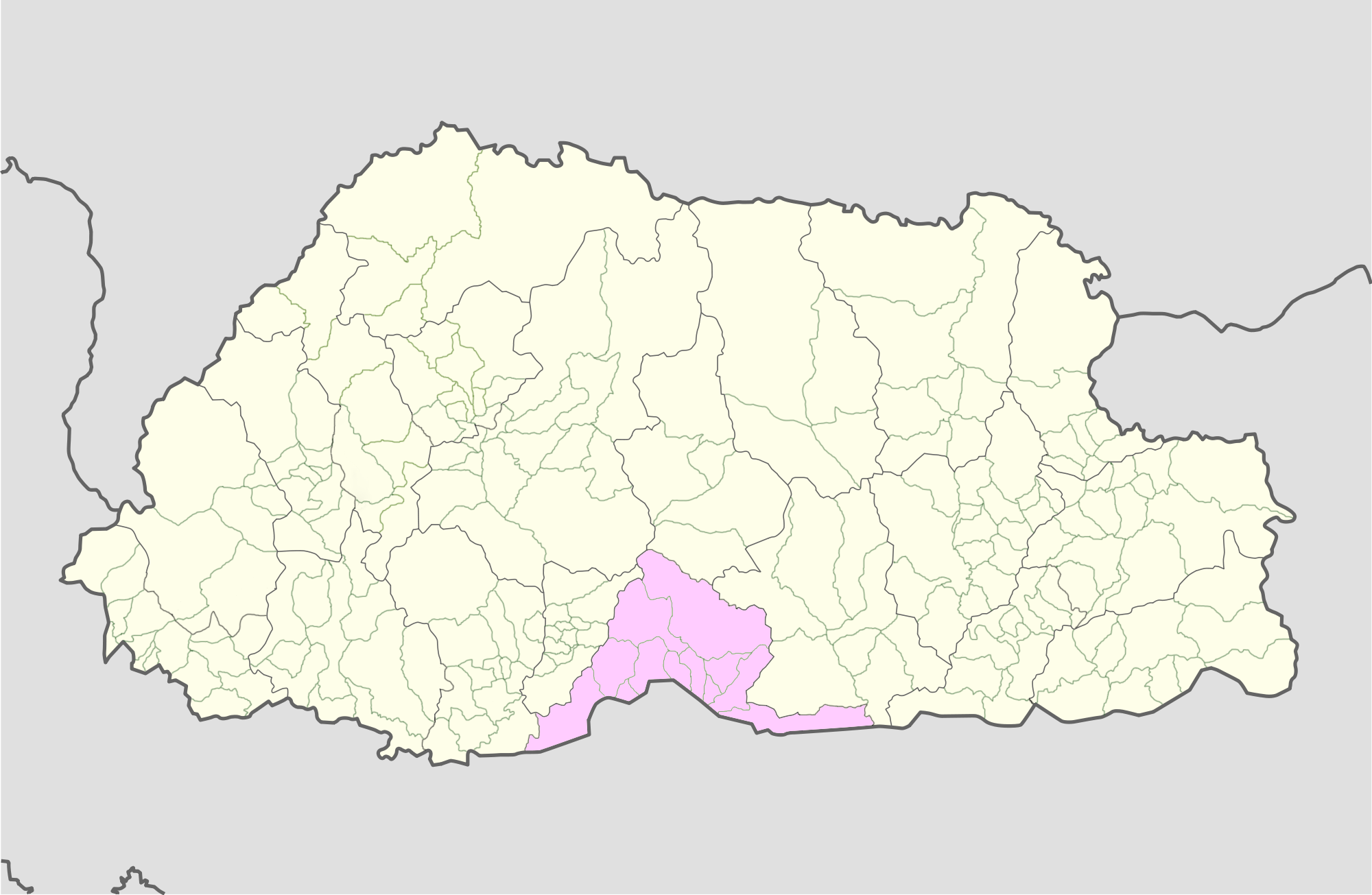
- Country: Bhutan
- District: Sarpang District
- Time zone: UTC+6 (BTT)

Chhudzom Gewog (Dzongkha: ཆུ་འཛོམས་) is a gewog (village block) of Sarpang District, Bhutan.
