= Dekiling Gewog =

Dekiling Gewog བདེ་སྐྱིད་གླིང་
- Gewog
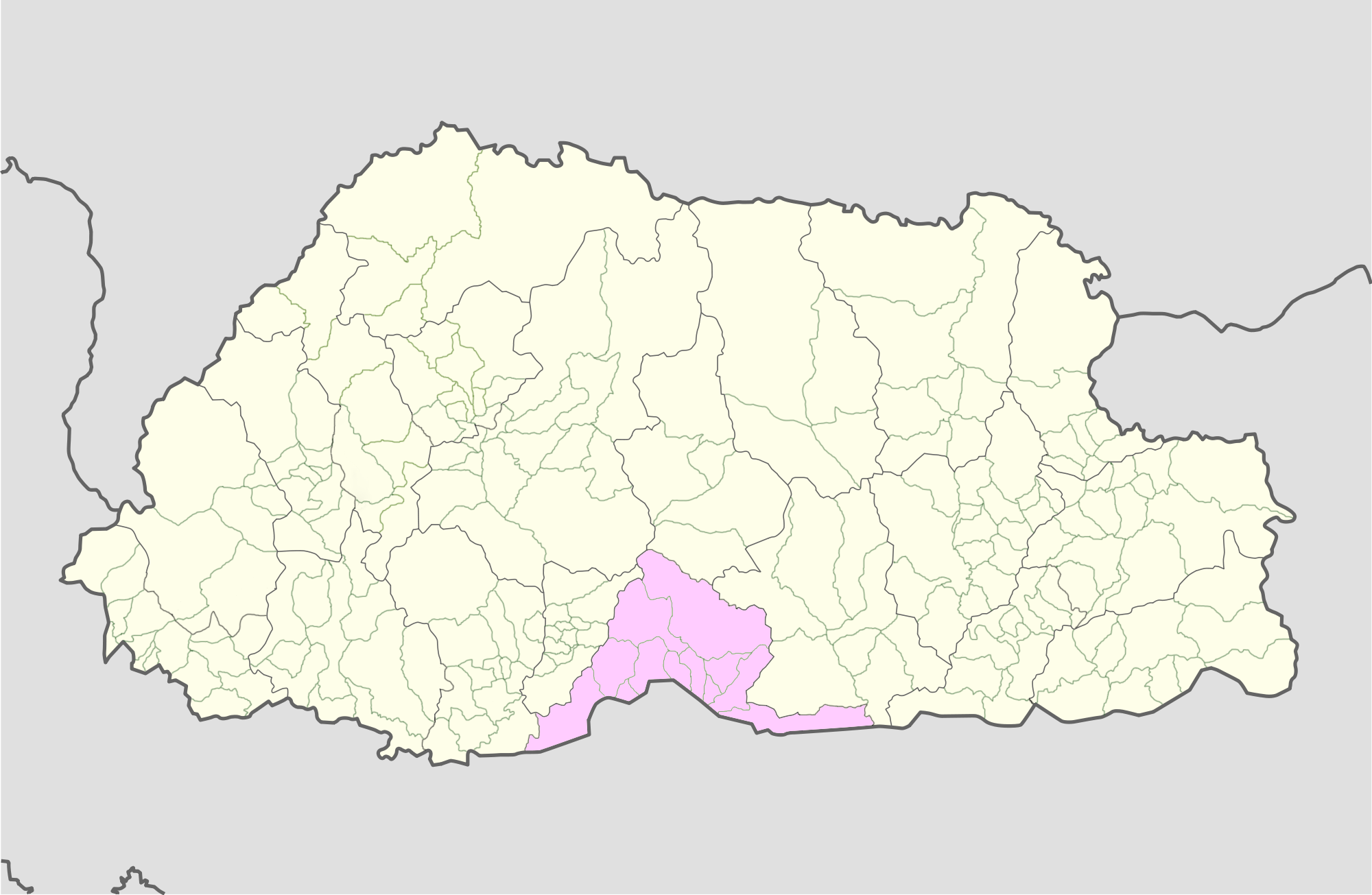
- Country: Bhutan
- District: Sarpang District
- Time zone: UTC+6 (BTT)

Dekiling Gewog (Dzongkha: བདེ་སྐྱིད་གླིང་) is a gewog (village block) of Sarpang District, Bhutan.
