= Jigmechhoeling Gewog =

Jigmechholing Gewog འཇིགས་མེད་ཆོས་གླིང་
- Gewog
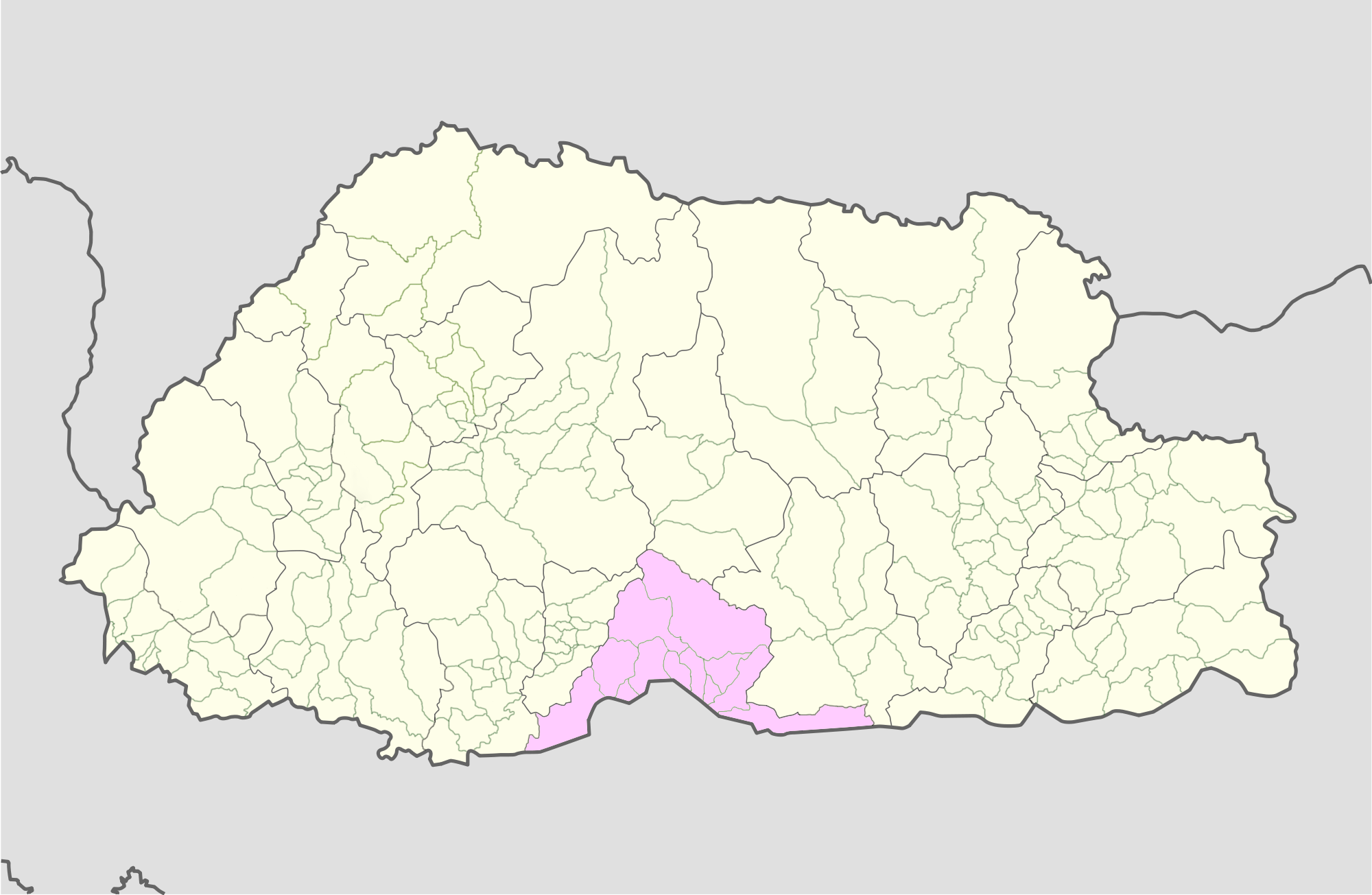
- Country: Bhutan
- District: Sarpang District
- Time zone: UTC+6 (BTT)

Jigmechholing Gewog (Dzongkha: འཇིགས་མེད་ཆོས་གླིང་), also transliterated as Jigmecholing or Jigmechoeling and formerly known as Surey is a gewog (village block) of Sarpang District, Bhutan.
