= Shompangkha Gewog =

Shompangkha Gewog ཤོམ་སྤང་ཁ་
- Gewog
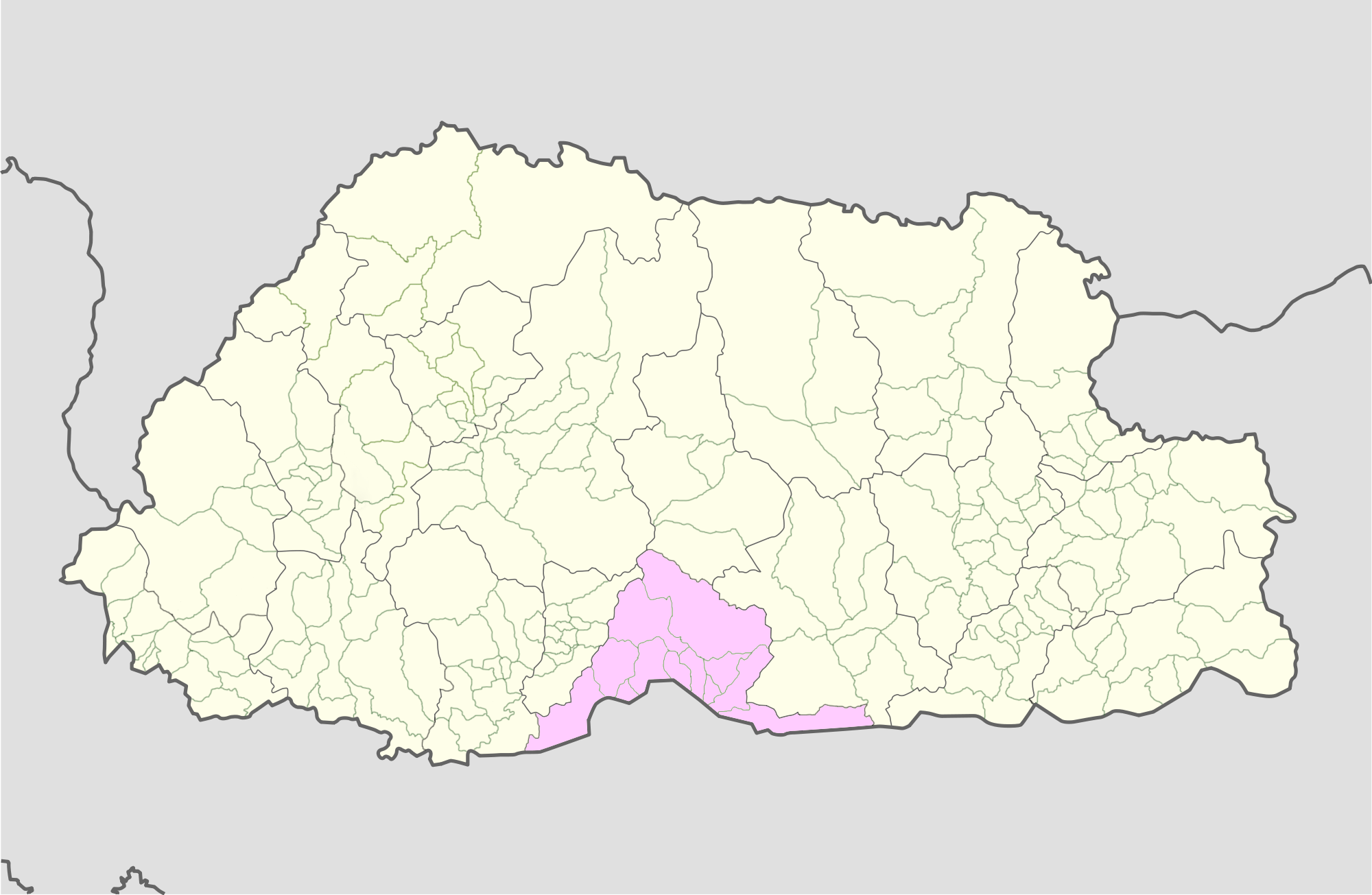
- Country: Bhutan
- District: Sarpang District
- Time zone: UTC+6 (BTT)

Shompangkha Gewog (Dzongkha: ཤོམ་སྤང་ཁ་) is a gewog (village block) of Sarpang District, Bhutan.
