= Korphu Gewog =

Korphu Gewog སྐོར་ཕུག་
- Gewog
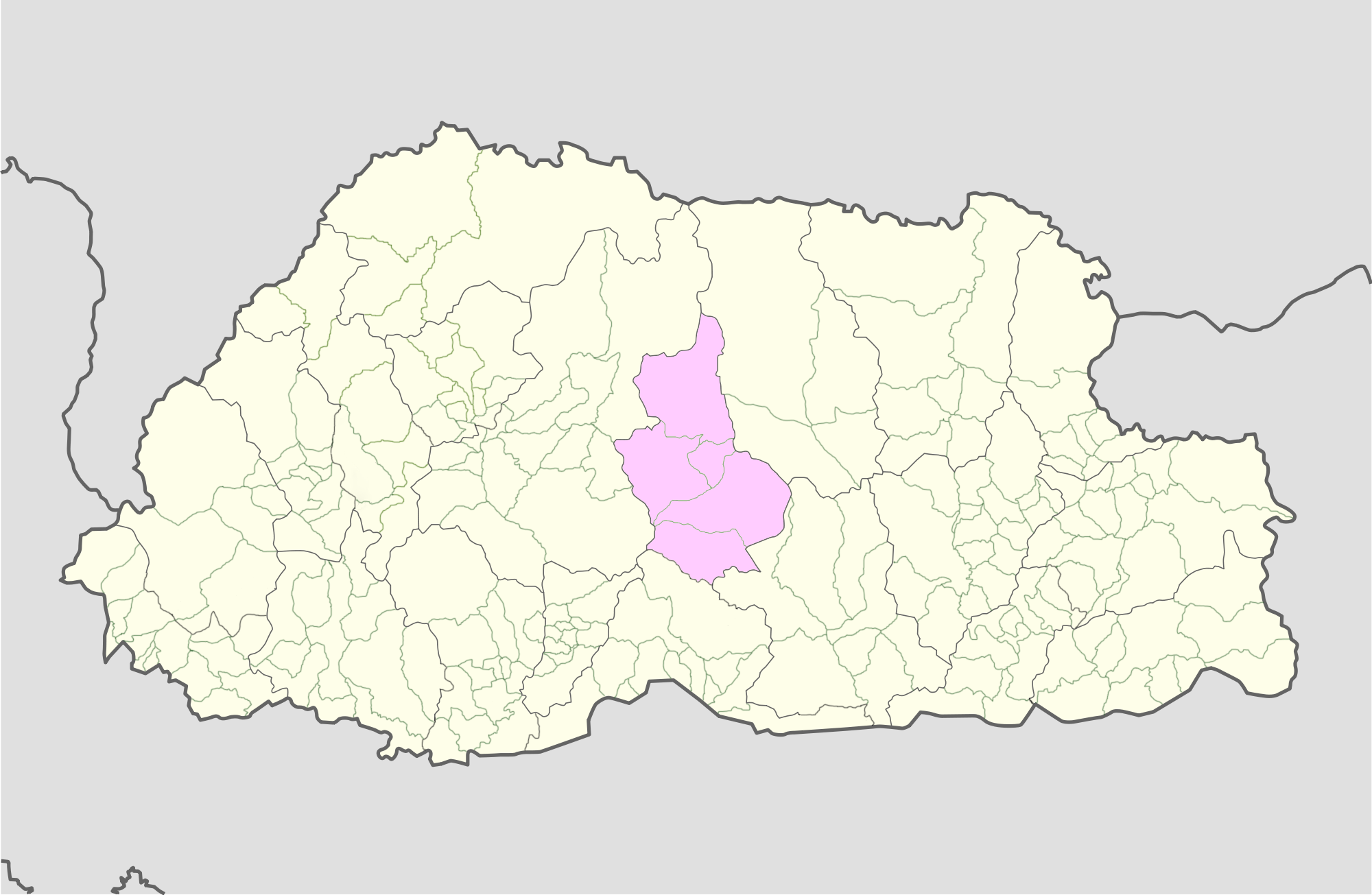
- Country: Bhutan
- District: Trongsa District
- Time zone: UTC+6 (BTT)

Korphoog Gewog (Dzongkha: སྐོར་ཕུག་), also spelled Korphu is a gewog (village block) of Trongsa District, Bhutan. The name was derived from gour pho which literally translate to stone cave. Gour meaning stone and pho meaning cave. The stone cave from where the name was derived can still be seen below the village, just above the school. The village is founded by Guru Rinpoche's great treasure discover Terton Pema Lingpa in late 15th century
