= Sarpang District =

District of Bhutan

Coordinates: 26°50′N 90°15′E

Sarpang District གསར་སྤང་རྫོང་ཁག།
- District
- Location of Sarpang district within Bhutan
- Country: Bhutan
- Headquarters: Sarpang

Area
  - Total: 1,946 km^{2} (751 sq mi)

Population (2017)
  - Total: 46,004
  - Density: 23.64/km^{2} (61.23/sq mi)
- Time zone: UTC+6 (BTT)
- HDI (2019): 0.684 medium · 4th
- Website: www.sarpang.gov.bt

Sarpang District (Dzongkha: གསར་སྤང་རྫོང་ཁག།; Wylie: Gsar-spang rdzong-khag; also known as Geylegphug is one of the 20 dzongkhags (districts) comprising Bhutan. Sarpang covers a total area of 1,946 km^{2} (751 sq mi) and stretches from Lhamoizhingkha in West Bhutan to Manas National Park in the east. Sarpang Dzongkhag is divided into one dungkhag, Gelephu, and 12 gewogs.

== Languages ==
The dominant language in Sarpang is Nepali, an Indo-European language spoken by the heterogeneous Lhotshampa community. The East Bodish Kheng language is also spoken in the northeastern reaches of the district by the Kheng people, who are indigenous to the region.

== Administrative divisions ==
Sarpang District is divided into twelve village blocks (or gewogs):

- Chhuzagang Gewog
- Chhudzom Gewog
- Dekiling Gewog
- Gakiling Gewog
- Gelephu Gewog
- Jigmechhoeling Gewog
- Samtenling Gewog
- Senghe Gewog
- Serzhong Gewog
- Shompangkha Gewog
- Tareythang Gewog
- Umling Gewog

== Environment ==
Much of Sarpang District consists of environmentally protected areas. Far western Sarpang District (the gewog of Senghe) contains part of the uninhabited Phibsoo Wildlife Sanctuary along the India border; northern Sarpang District (the gewog of Jigmechhoeling) is part of Jigme Singye Wangchuck National Park; eastern and southeastern Sarpang District (the gewogs of Jigmechhoeling, Tareythang and Umling) lie within Royal Manas National Park. Sarpang is bisected by a wide swath of biological corridor connecting all three environmentally protected areas.

== History ==
On April 26, 2007, Lhamoy Zingkha Dungkhag (sub-district) was formally transferred from Sarpang Dzongkhag to Dagana Dzongkhag, affecting the town of Lhamozingkha and three gewogs – Lhamoizingkha, Deorali and Nichula Gewog (Zinchula) – that formed the westernmost part of Sarpang and became the southernmost part of Dagana.

== Climate ==
Climate data for Gelephu (Bhur), Sarpang District, elevation 375 m (1,230 ft), (1996–2017 normals)
Month	Jan	Feb	Mar	Apr	May	Jun	Jul	Aug	Sep	Oct	Nov	Dec	Year
Record high °C (°F)	30.0 (86.0)	35.0 (95.0)	33.2 (91.8)	36.4 (97.5)	37.0 (98.6)	36.0 (96.8)	38.5 (101.3)	38.8 (101.8)	39.0 (102.2)	37.0 (98.6)	35.0 (95.0)	32.0 (89.6)	39.0 (102.2)
Mean daily maximum °C (°F)	22.3 (72.1)	24.0 (75.2)	26.4 (79.5)	27.6 (81.7)	28.8 (83.8)	29.1 (84.4)	29.5 (85.1)	30.2 (86.4)	29.6 (85.3)	28.7 (83.7)	26.3 (79.3)	23.8 (74.8)	27.2 (80.9)
Daily mean °C (°F)	17.8 (64.0)	19.9 (67.8)	22.4 (72.3)	24.2 (75.6)	25.6 (78.1)	26.3 (79.3)	26.7 (80.1)	27.2 (81.0)	26.5 (79.7)	24.9 (76.8)	22.0 (71.6)	19.3 (66.7)	23.6 (74.4)
Mean daily minimum °C (°F)	13.2 (55.8)	15.8 (60.4)	18.4 (65.1)	20.7 (69.3)	22.4 (72.3)	23.5 (74.3)	23.9 (75.0)	24.2 (75.6)	23.4 (74.1)	21.1 (70.0)	17.7 (63.9)	14.7 (58.5)	19.9 (67.9)
Record low °C (°F)	6.0 (42.8)	8.0 (46.4)	10.0 (50.0)	13.0 (55.4)	15.5 (59.9)	18.2 (64.8)	19.0 (66.2)	19.5 (67.1)	18.5 (65.3)	15.0 (59.0)	10.5 (50.9)	7.0 (44.6)	6.0 (42.8)
Average rainfall mm (inches)	16.6 (0.65)	29.0 (1.14)	73.6 (2.90)	237.3 (9.34)	445.6 (17.54)	1,032.7 (40.66)	1,313.7 (51.72)	1,051.9 (41.41)	686.2 (27.02)	192.7 (7.59)	16.3 (0.64)	10.0 (0.39)	5,105.6 (201)
Average relative humidity (%)	70.2	68.9	69.2	78.8	82.0	86.5	87.5	85.9	83.5	76.6	71.9	70.5	77.6
Source: National Center for Hydrology and Meteorology

== See also ==
- Districts of Bhutan
- Lhamoyzingkhar
- Trongsa Province
