= Bhulajhora Gewog =

- Gewog
- Country: Bhutan
- District: Chukha District
- Sub-district: Phuentsholing Dungkhag

Area
  - Total: 28 sq mi (73 km^{2})
- Time zone: UTC+6 (BTT)

Bhulajhora Gewog is a former gewog (village block) of Chukha District, Bhutan. The gewog had an area of 73 square kilometres and contained 17 villages. Bhulajhora Gewog was part of Phuentsholing Dungkhag, along with Dala, Logchina, and Phuentsholing Gewogs.
