= Bakuli Gewog =

- Gewog
- Country: Bhutan
- District: Samdrup Jongkhar District
- Sub-district: Bhangtar Dungkhag
- Time zone: UTC+6 (BTT)

Bakuli Gewog was a gewog (village block) of Samdrup Jongkhar District, Bhutan. It also formed part of Bhangtar Dungkhag, along with Martshala and Dalim and Samrang Gewogs.
