= Ghumauney Gewog =

- Gewog
- Country: Bhutan
- District: Samtse District
- Sub-district: Chengmari Dungkhag
- Time zone: UTC+6 (BTT)

Ghumauney Gewog is a former gewog (village block) of Samtse District, Bhutan. Ghumauney Gewog was part of Chengmari Dungkhag, together with Chargharey, Nainital, and Chengmari Gewogs.
