= Logchina Gewog =

Logchina Gewog ལོག་ཅི་ན་
- Gewogs
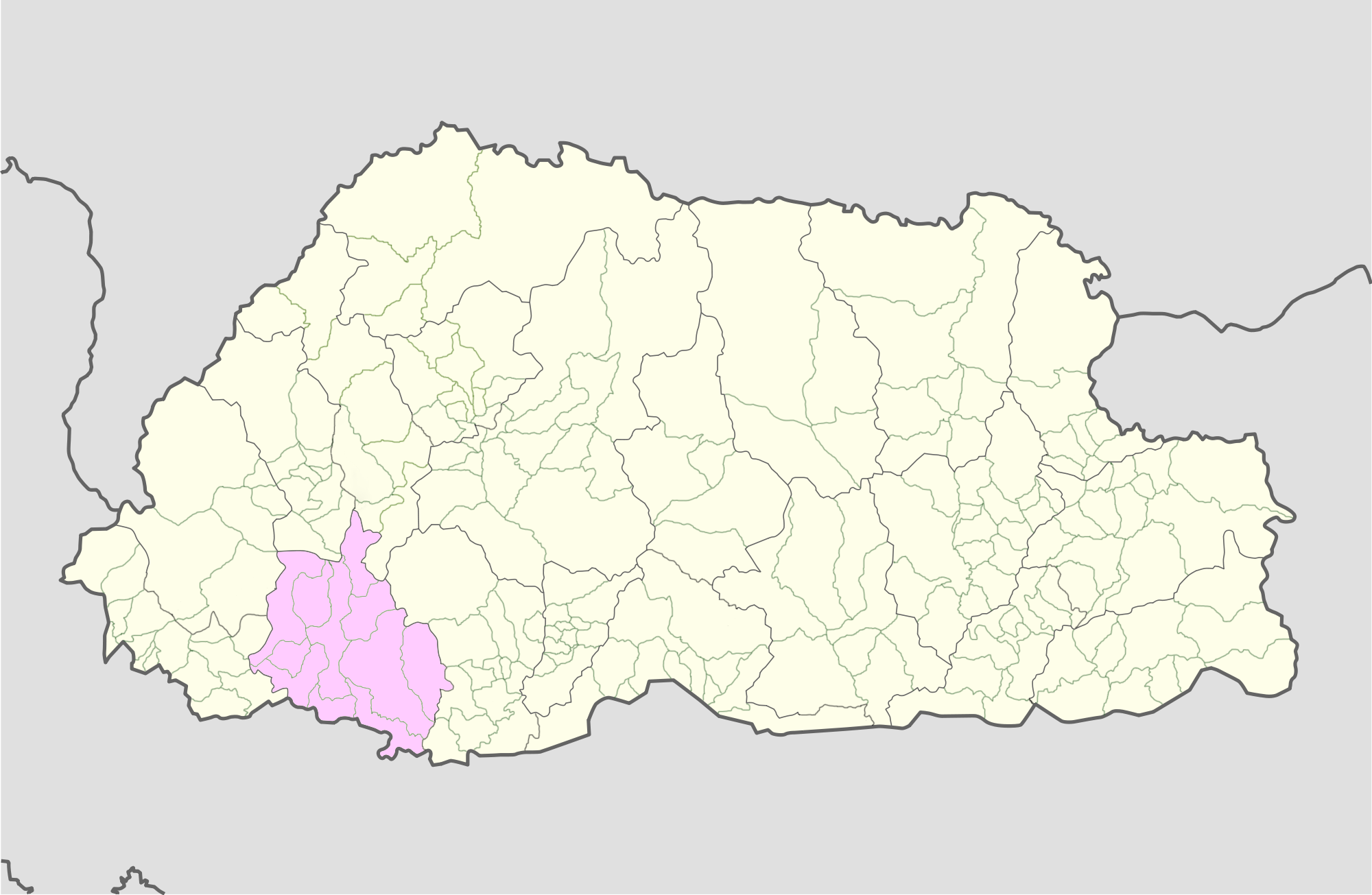
- Location within Chukha District
- Coordinates: 26°57′50″N 89°22′12″E
- Country: Bhutan
- District: Chukha District
- Sub-district: Phuentsholing Dungkhag

Area
  - Total: 27.2 sq mi (70.4 km^{2})

Population
  - Total: 2,500
- Time zone: UTC+6 (BTT)

Logchina Gewog (Dzongkha: ལོག་ཅི་ན་,Loggchina Gewog) is a gewog (village block) of Chukha District, Bhutan. The gewog has an area of 70.4 square kilometres and contains 12 villages. The estimated population is 2,500 inhabitants. Logchina Gewog is part of Phuentsholing Dungkhag (sub-district), along with Dala, Sampheling, Dungna, Metakha and Phuentsholing Gewogs.

Logchina has two primary schools and one community school.
