= Lauri Gewog =

Lauri Gewog ལའུ་རི་
- Gewog
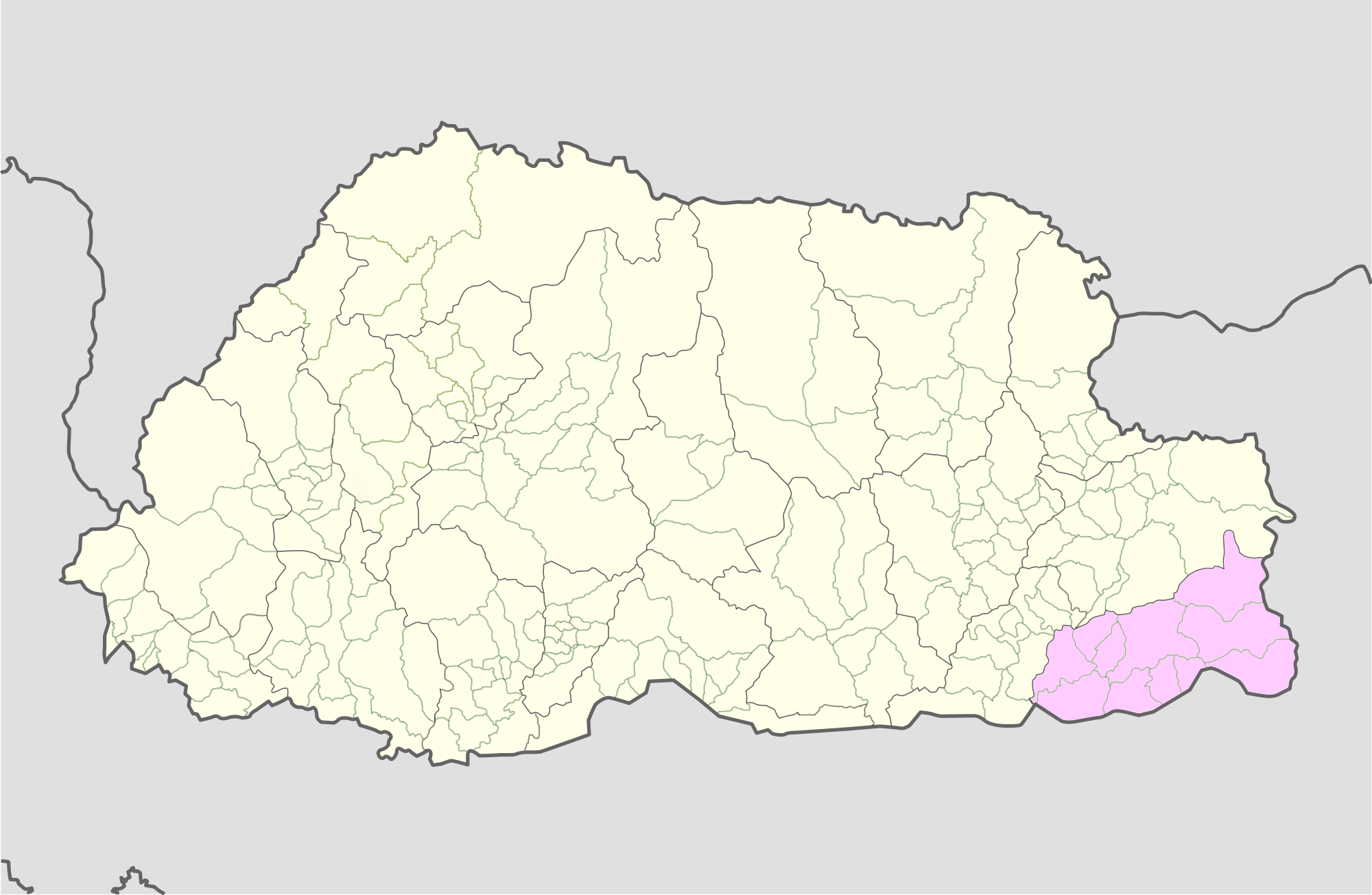
- Interactive map of Lauri Gewog
- Coordinates: 27.1420°N 91.9122°E
- Country: Bhutan
- District: Samdrup Jongkhar District
- Time zone: UTC+6 (BTT)

Lauri Gewog (Dzongkha: ལའུ་རི་) is a gewog (village block) of Samdrup Jongkhar District, Bhutan. It was also part of Jomotsangkha Dungkhag (sub-district), together with Serthi Gewog.
