= Hastinapur Gewog =

- Gewog
- Country: Bhutan
- District: Samdrup Jongkhar District
- Time zone: UTC+6 (BTT)

Hastinapur Gewog is a former gewog (village block) of Samdrup Jongkhar District, Bhutan.
