= Mayona Gewog =

- Gewog
- Country: Bhutan
- District: Samtse District
- Sub-district: Dorokha Dungkhag
- Time zone: UTC+6 (BTT)

Mayona Gewog is a former a gewog (village block) of Samtse District, Bhutan. It was part of Dorokha Dungkhag (sub-district), together with Dorokha, Dungtoe, and Denchukha Gewogs.
