= Ugentse Gewog =

Ugentse Gewog ཨྱོན་རྩེ་
- Gewog
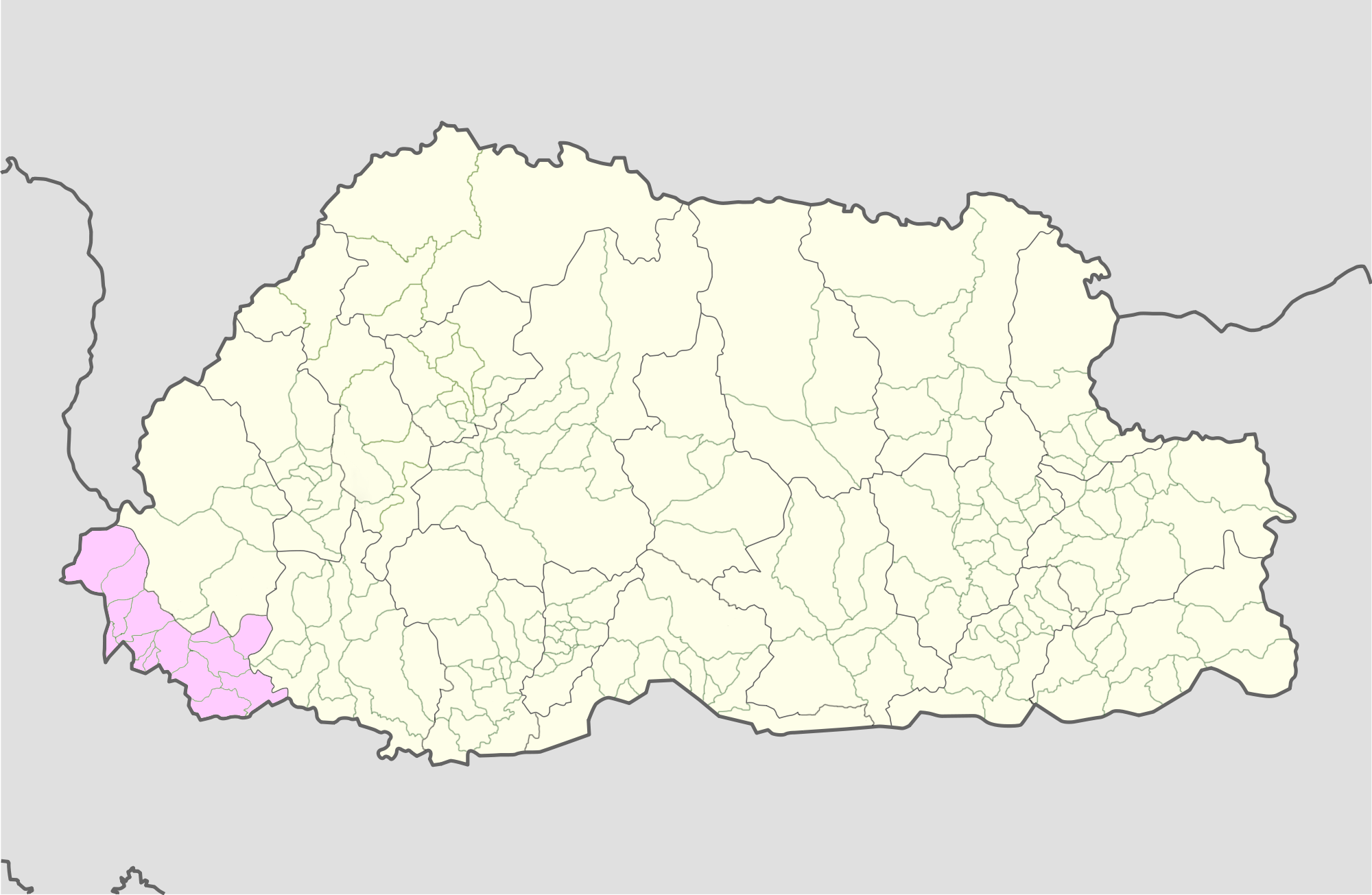
- Country: Bhutan
- District: Samtse District
- Time zone: UTC+6 (BTT)

Ugentse Gewog (Dzongkha: ཨྱོན་རྩེ་) is a gewog (village block) of Samtse District, Bhutan.
