= Bapbi Gewog =

- Gewog
- Country: Bhutan
- District: Thimphu District
- Time zone: UTC+6 (BTT)

Bapbi Gewog was a gewog (village block) of Thimphu District, Bhutan.
