= Tsirang Dangra Gewog =

- Gewog
- Country: Bhutan
- District: Tsirang District
- Time zone: UTC+6 (BTT)

Tsirang Dangra Gewog was a gewog (village block) of Tsirang District, Bhutan.
