= Gomdar Gewog =

Gomdar Gewog སྒོམ་དར་
- Gewog
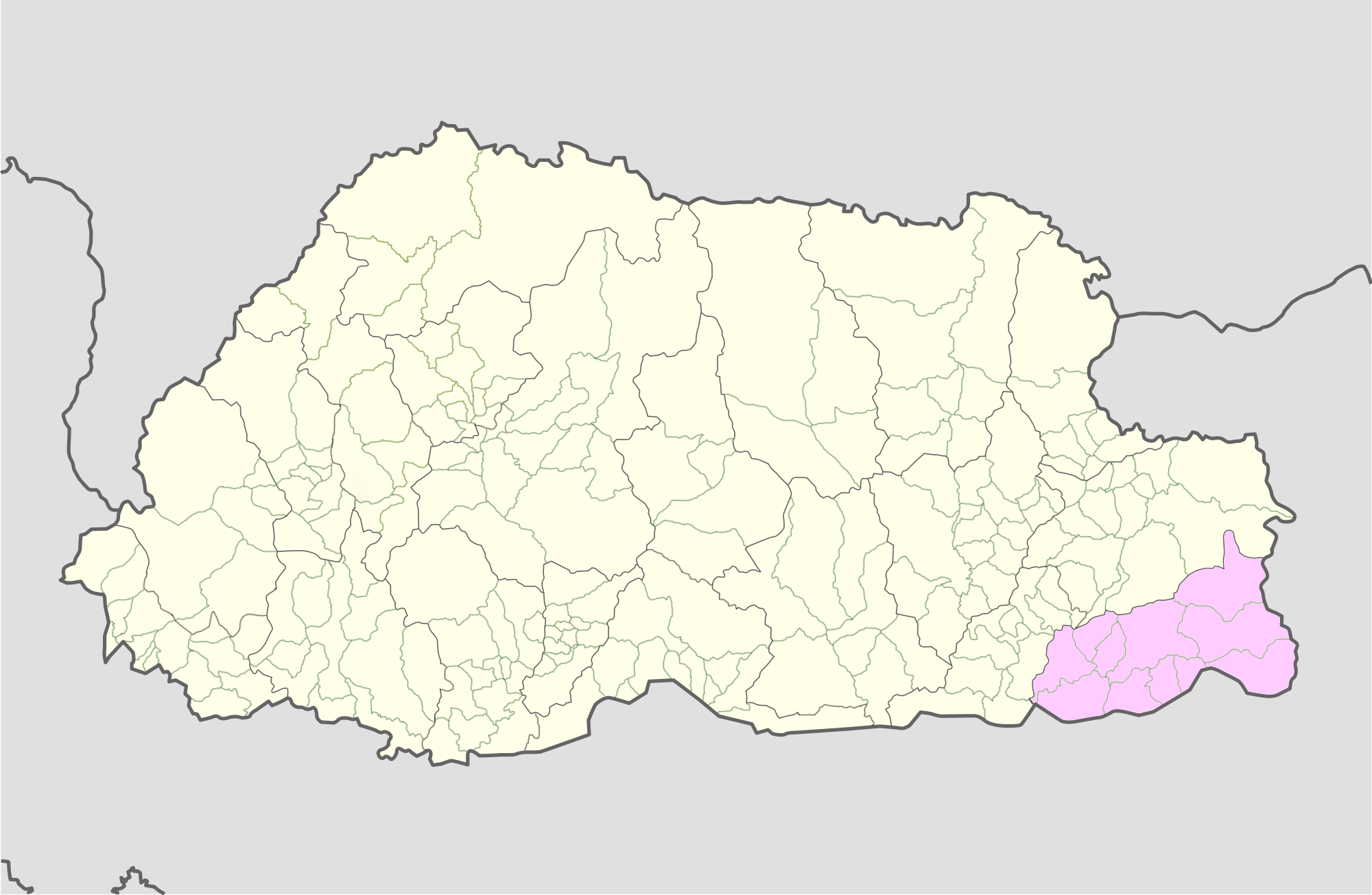
- Interactive map of Gomdar Gewog
- Coordinates: 27.003°N 91.553°E
- Country: Bhutan
- District: Samdrup Jongkhar District
- Time zone: UTC+6 (BTT)

Gomdar Gewog (Dzongkha: སྒོམ་དར་) is a gewog (village block) of Samdrup Jongkhar District, Bhutan.
