= Pemathang Gewog =

Administrative area in Samdrup Jongkhar District, Bhutan

Pemathang Gewog པདྨ་ཐང་
- Gewog
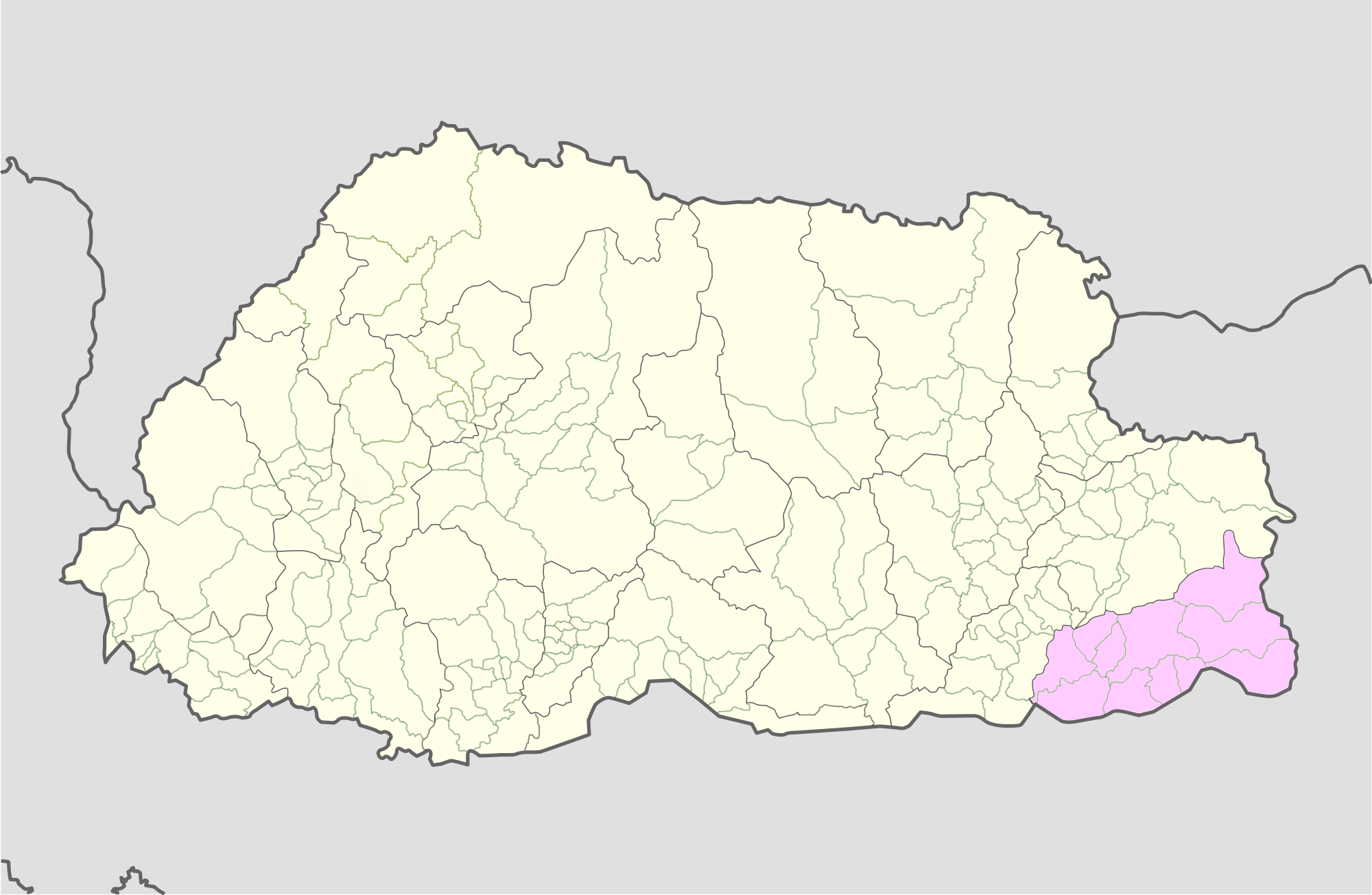
- Interactive map of Pemathang Gewog
- Coordinates: 26.8943°N 91.7627°E
- Country: Bhutan
- District: Samdrup Jongkhar District
- Time zone: UTC+6 (BTT)

Pemathang Gewog (Dzongkha: པདྨ་ཐང་) is a gewog (village block) of Samdrup Jongkhar District, Bhutan. Pemathang and Phuntshothang Gewogs comprise Samdrup Choling Dungkhag (sub-district).
