= Langchenphu Gewog =

Langchenphu Gewog གླང་ཅན་ཕུ་
- Gewog
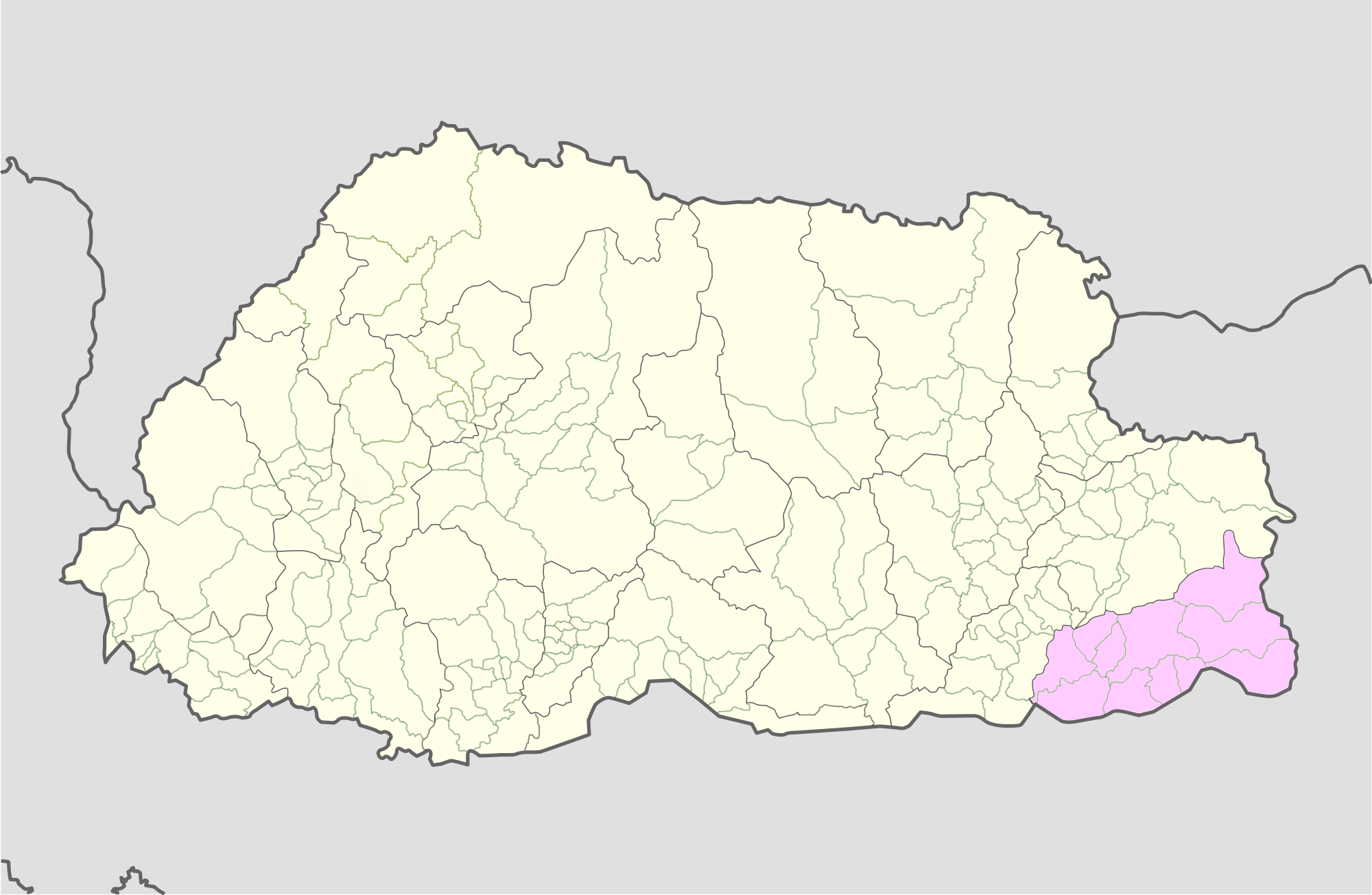
- Interactive map of Langchenphu Gewog
- Coordinates: 26.9197°N 91.9988°E
- Country: Bhutan
- District: Samdrup Jongkhar District
- Time zone: UTC+6 (BTT)

Langchenphu Gewog (Dzongkha: གླང་ཅན་ཕུ་) is a gewog (village block) of Samdrup Jongkhar District, Bhutan.

== See also ==
- Jomotsangkha
