= Orong Gewog =

Orong Gewog or Jangchubling Gewog ཨོ་རོང་
- Gewog
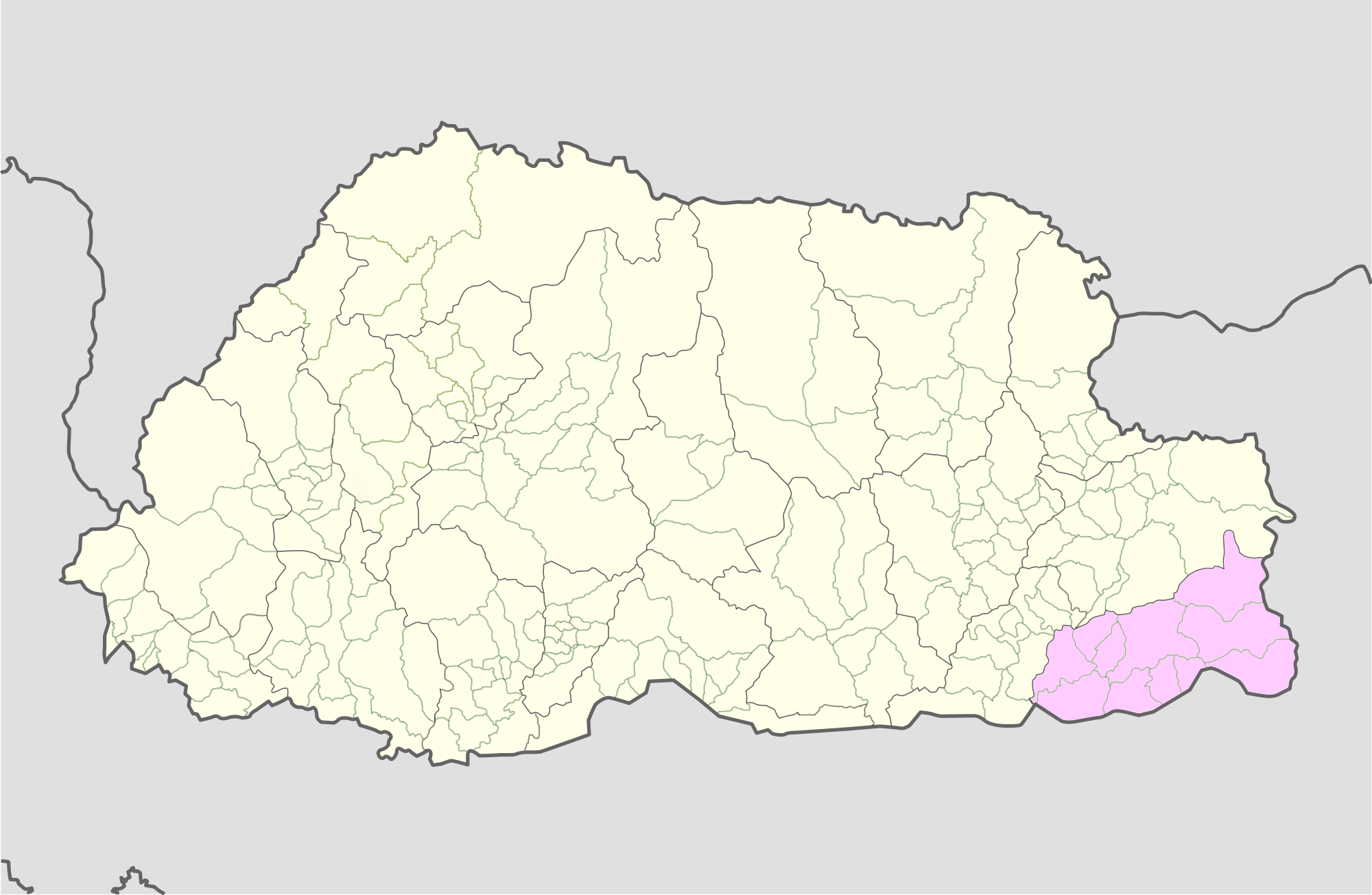
- Interactive map of Orong Gewog or Jangchubling Gewog
- Coordinates: 26.934°N 91.4859°E
- Country: Bhutan
- District: Samdrup Jongkhar District
- Time zone: UTC+6 (BTT)

Orong Gewog (Dzongkha: ཨོ་རོང་) is a gewog (smallest administrative Unit in Bhutan called block) of Samdrup Jongkhar District, Bhutan. It is situated north of Samdrup Jongkhar town. The Gewog is about 45 km from Samdrup Jongkhar with a 12 km Gewog Center (GC) road bifurcating from the national highway at Shekpashing which connects Samdrup Jongkhar and Trashigang District.

The Gewog is a collection of many villages mostly located over a gentle slope facing the Arong Mithun Breeding center. The Gewog has six Chiwogs (Sub-blocks) and 24 villages with a total of 540 households. Important villages include Mitshishing, Durtsun, Malang, Belam, Chongti, and Melum. Other important villages which are further away include Morong, Wooling, Philooma and Rimung. The 12 km Gewog Road is black-topped. All other major villages are connected with farm roads which are playable except during monsoon months.

Orong Central School (previously Orong Higher Secondary High School) is the only higher secondary school in the district, and is located on the top of the Orong Village overlooking Dewathang.

Orong has a basic health unit, a community lhakhang (Gonpa), Renewable Natural Resource (RNR) Center and Gewog Office. Electrification is 100%.
