= Rangthangling Gewog =

Rangthangling Gewog རང་ཐང་གླིང་
- Gewog
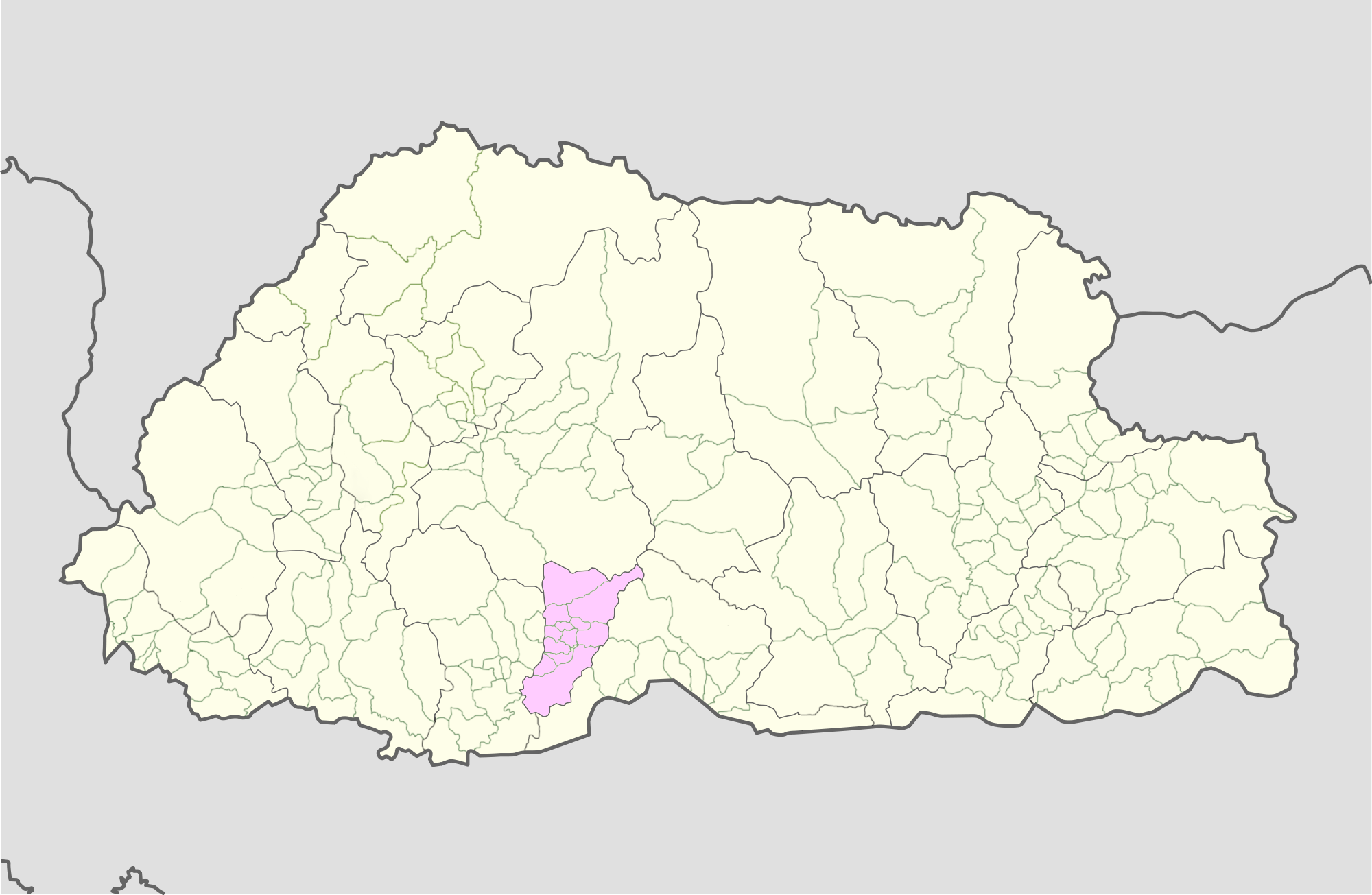
- Country: Bhutan
- District: Tsirang District
- Time zone: UTC+6 (BTT)

Rangthangling Gewog (Dzongkha: རང་ཐང་གླིང་) is a gewog (village block) of Tsirang District, Bhutan.
