= Wangphu Gewog =

Wangphu Gewog ཝང་ཕུག་
- Gewog
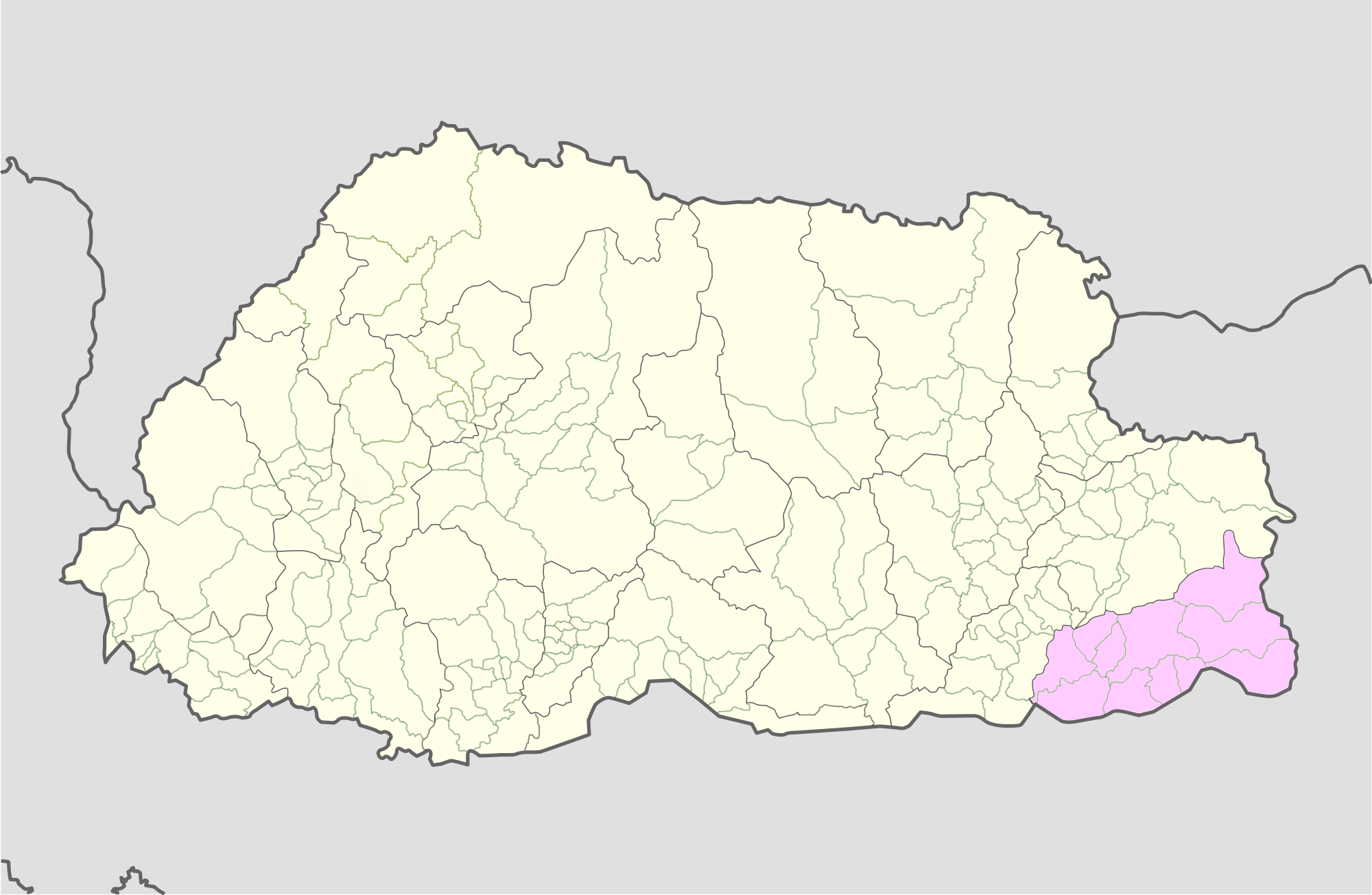
- Interactive map of Wangphu Gewog
- Coordinates: 26.9769°N 91.6173°E
- Country: Bhutan
- District: Samdrup Jongkhar District
- Time zone: UTC+6 (BTT)

Wangphu Gewog (Dzongkha: ཝང་ཕུག་) is a gewog (village block) of Samdrup Jongkhar District, Bhutan.
