= Tsirangtoe Gewog =

Tsirangtoe Gewog རྩི་རང་སྟོད་
- Gewog
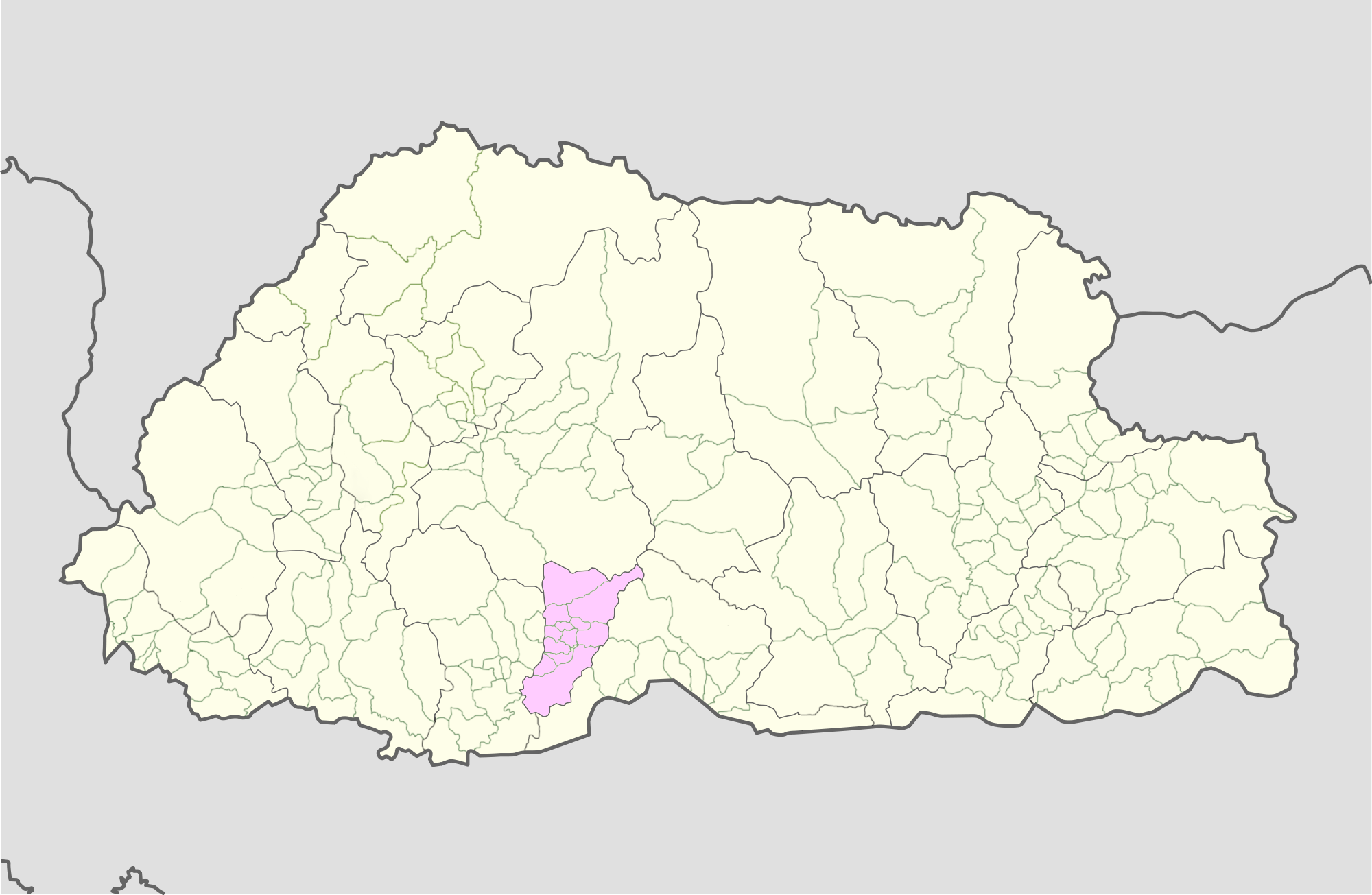
- Country: Bhutan
- District: Tsirang District
- Time zone: UTC+6 (BTT)

Tsirangtoe Gewog (Dzongkha: རྩི་རང་སྟོད་) is a gewog (village block) of Tsirang District, Bhutan.
