= Tshokhana Gewog =

- Gewog
- Country: Bhutan
- District: Tsirang District
- Time zone: UTC+6 (BTT)

Tshokhana Gewog is a former gewog (village block) of Tsirang District, Bhutan.
