= Tsholingkhar Gewog =

Tsholingkhar Gewog མཚོ་གླིང་མཁར་
- Gewog
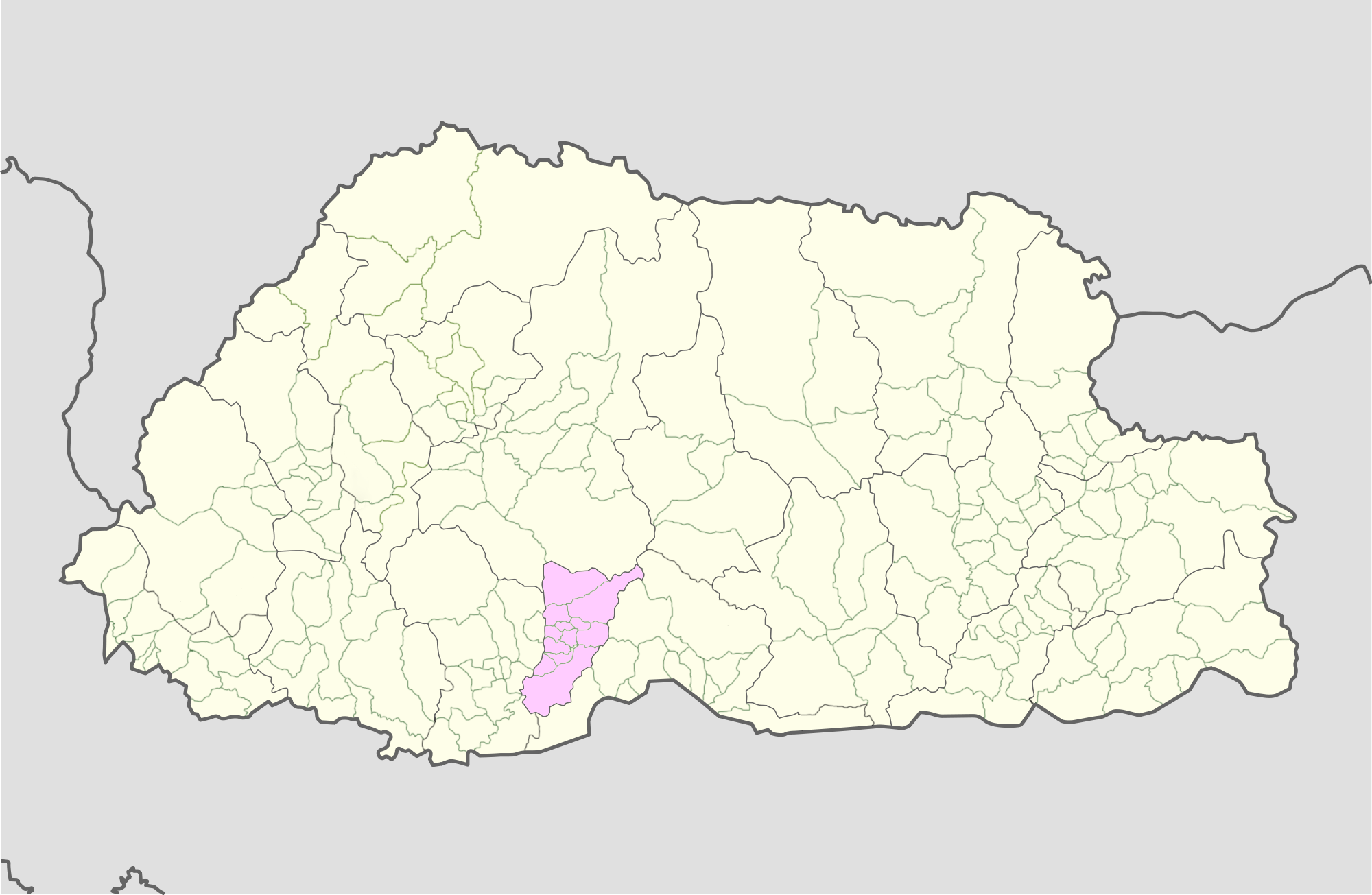
- Country: Bhutan
- District: Tsirang District
- Time zone: UTC+6 (BTT)

Tsholingkhar Gewog (Dzongkha: མཚོ་གླིང་མཁར་) is a gewog (village block) of Tsirang District, Bhutan.
