= Lumang Gewog =

Lumang Gewog ཀླུ་མང་
- Gewog
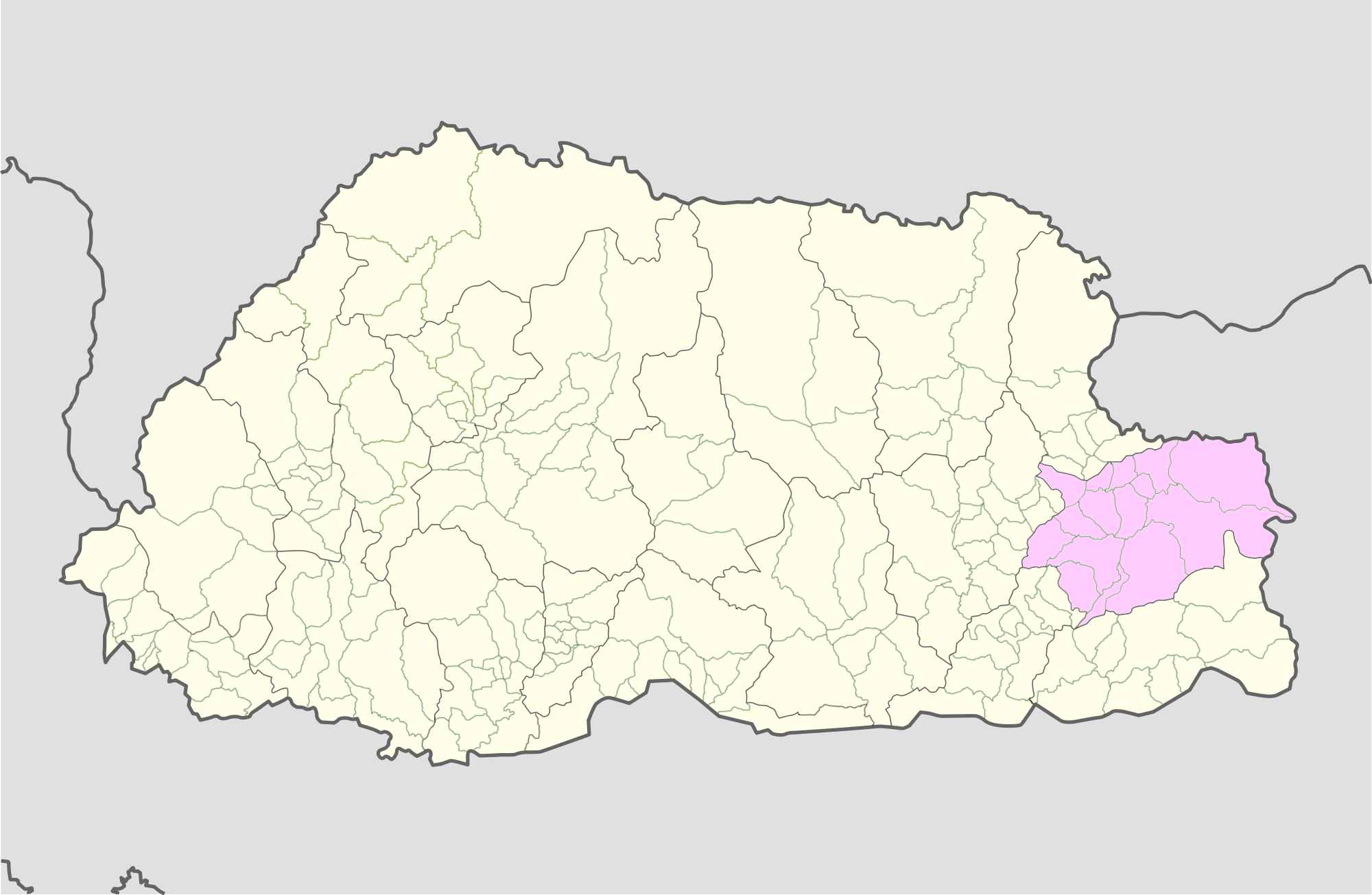
- Country: Bhutan
- District: Trashigang District
- Time zone: UTC+6 (BTT)

Lumang Gewog (Dzongkha: ཀླུ་མང་) is a gewog (village block) of Trashigang District, Bhutan. Lumang and Khaling Gewogs comprise Wamrong Dungkhag (sub-district).
