= Metakha Gewog =

Metakha Gewog སྨད་སྟབས་ཁ
- Gewogs
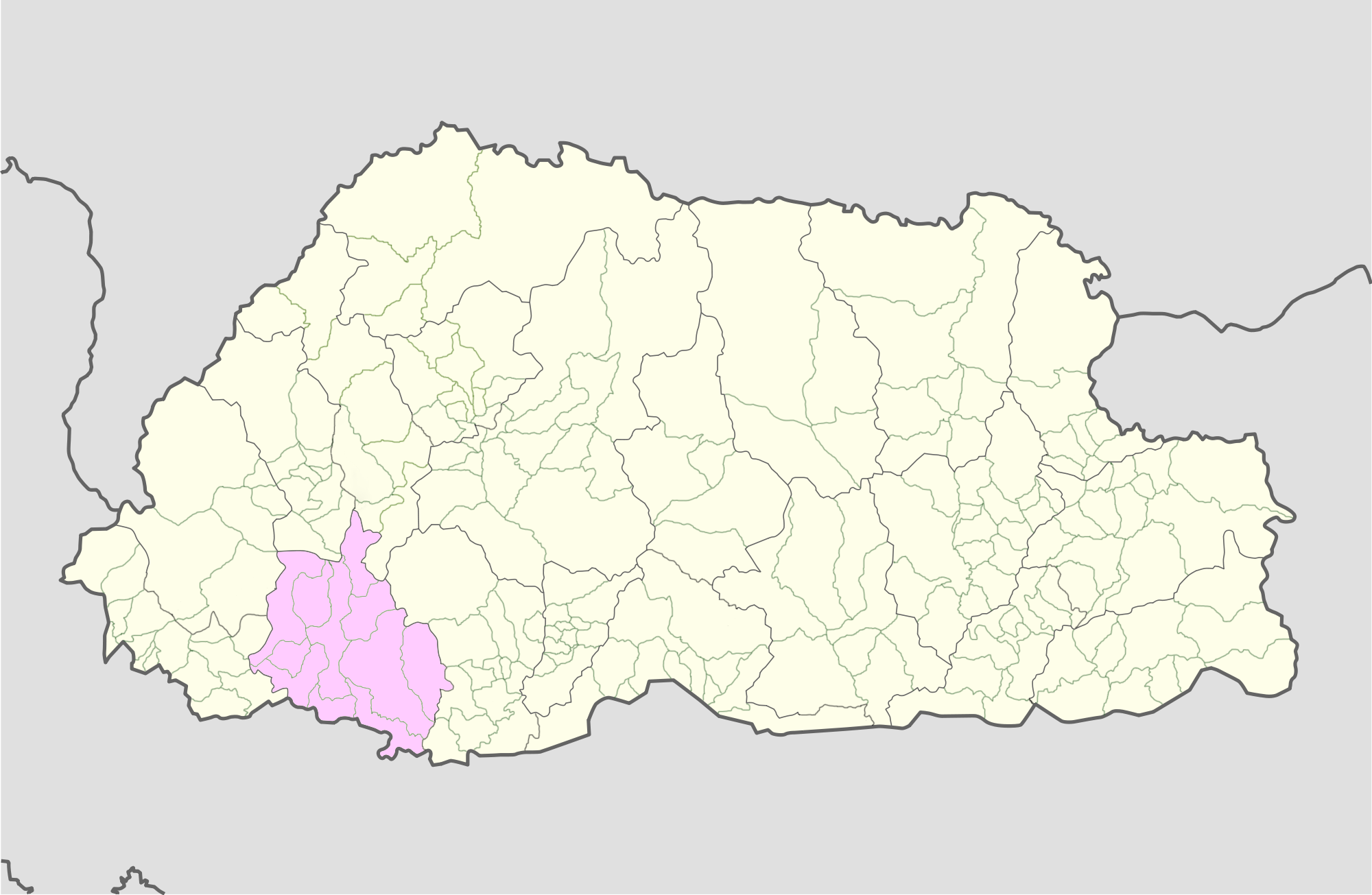
- Location within Chukha District
- Coordinates: 27°06′12″N 89°26′05″E
- Country: Bhutan
- District: Chukha District

Area
  - Total: 39 sq mi (100 km^{2})
- Time zone: UTC+6 (BTT)

Metakha Gewog (Dzongkha: སྨད་སྟབས་ཁ་, Metabkha Gewog) is a gewog (village block) of Chukha District, Bhutan. Metakha Gewog was established in 2016, and it is one of the smallest gewogs in Chukka Dzongkhag. The 100-km² gewog contains fifteen villages, 119 households and has a population of 1,036.

Metakha is considered a rural gewog and currently doesn’t have any blacktopped roads, making travel in and out of the area difficult. The People’s Democratic Party (PDP) promised to build blacktopped roads and maintain them if elected in December 2023. The PDP were elected in 2024.

As of May 2023, Metakha gewog does not have an agriculture extension officer to oversee agriculture-related plans.

== Sacred Places ==
=== Phuentsho Pelri Goempa Lhakhang ===
Phuntshog Pelri Monastery was built in the 15th century by the son of Drubchen Thangtong Rgyalpo, Dewa Zangpos. There are two guardians of the temple, Lhamo Ngag Sungma and Pho Lha Tashi Jungney.

== Land Use ==
Metakha has 770.23 acres of dry land and 116.230 acres of wet land, and farming is the main land use. Cardamom, Potato, Ginger and Rice are the major cash crops.
