= Martshala Gewog =

Martshala Gewog མར་ཚྭ་ལ་
- Gewog
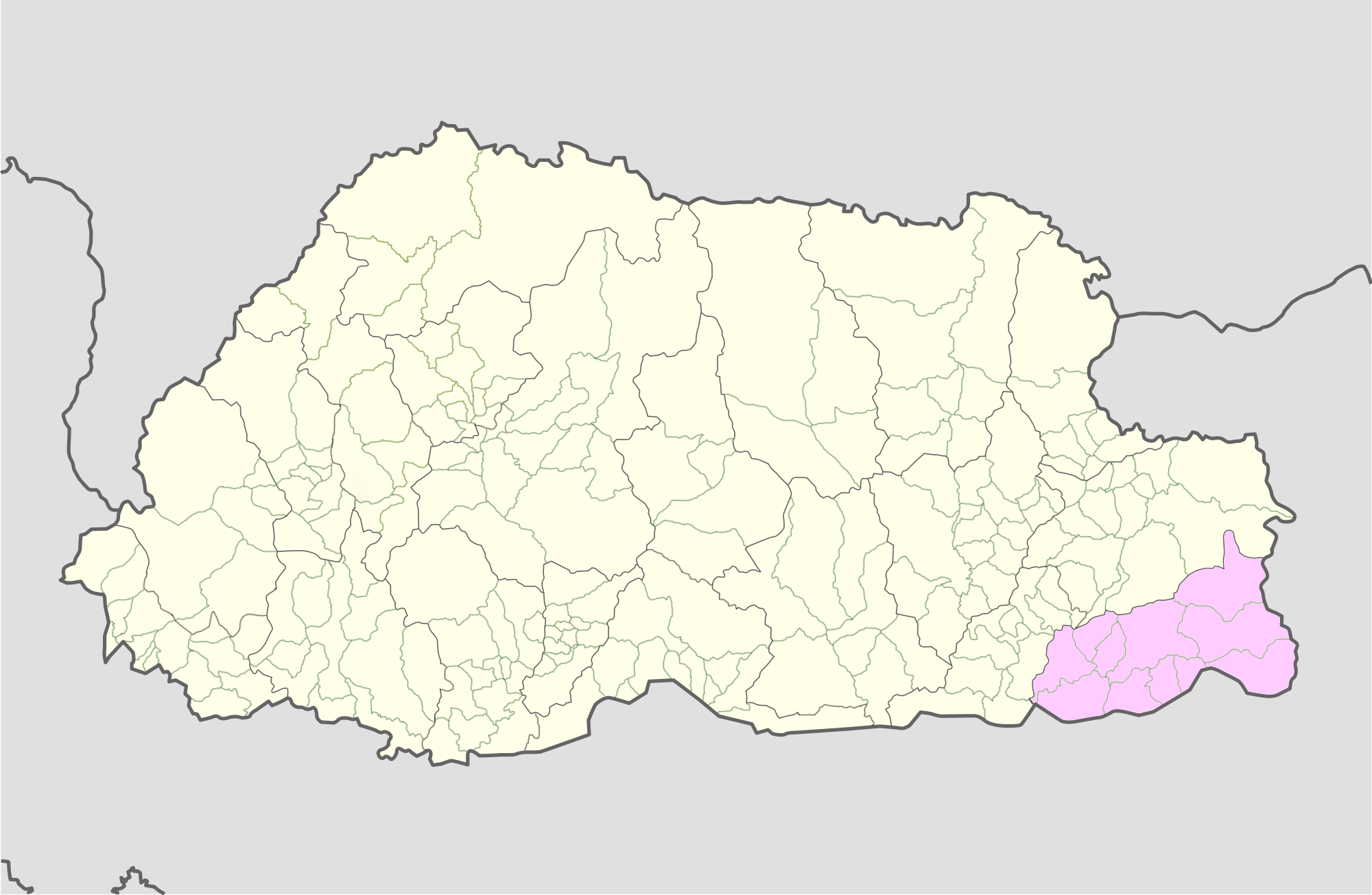
- Interactive map of Martshala Gewog
- Coordinates: 26.9900°N 91.7364°E
- Country: Bhutan
- District: Samdrup Jongkhar District
- Time zone: UTC+6 (BTT)

Martshala Gewog (Dzongkha: མར་ཚྭ་ལ་) is a gewog (village block) of Samdrup Jongkhar District, Bhutan. It also composed part of Bhangtar Dungkhag, along with Dalim and Samrang Gewogs
