= Chengmari Gewog =

- Gewog
- Country: Bhutan
- District: Samtse District
- Sub-district: Chengmari Dungkhag
- Time zone: UTC+6 (BTT)

Chengmari Gewog is a former gewog (village block) of Samtse District, Bhutan. Chengmari Gewog, together with Chargharey Gewog, comprises part of Chengmari Dungkhag.
