= Dungna Gewog =

Dungna Gewog གདུང་ན་
- Gewogs
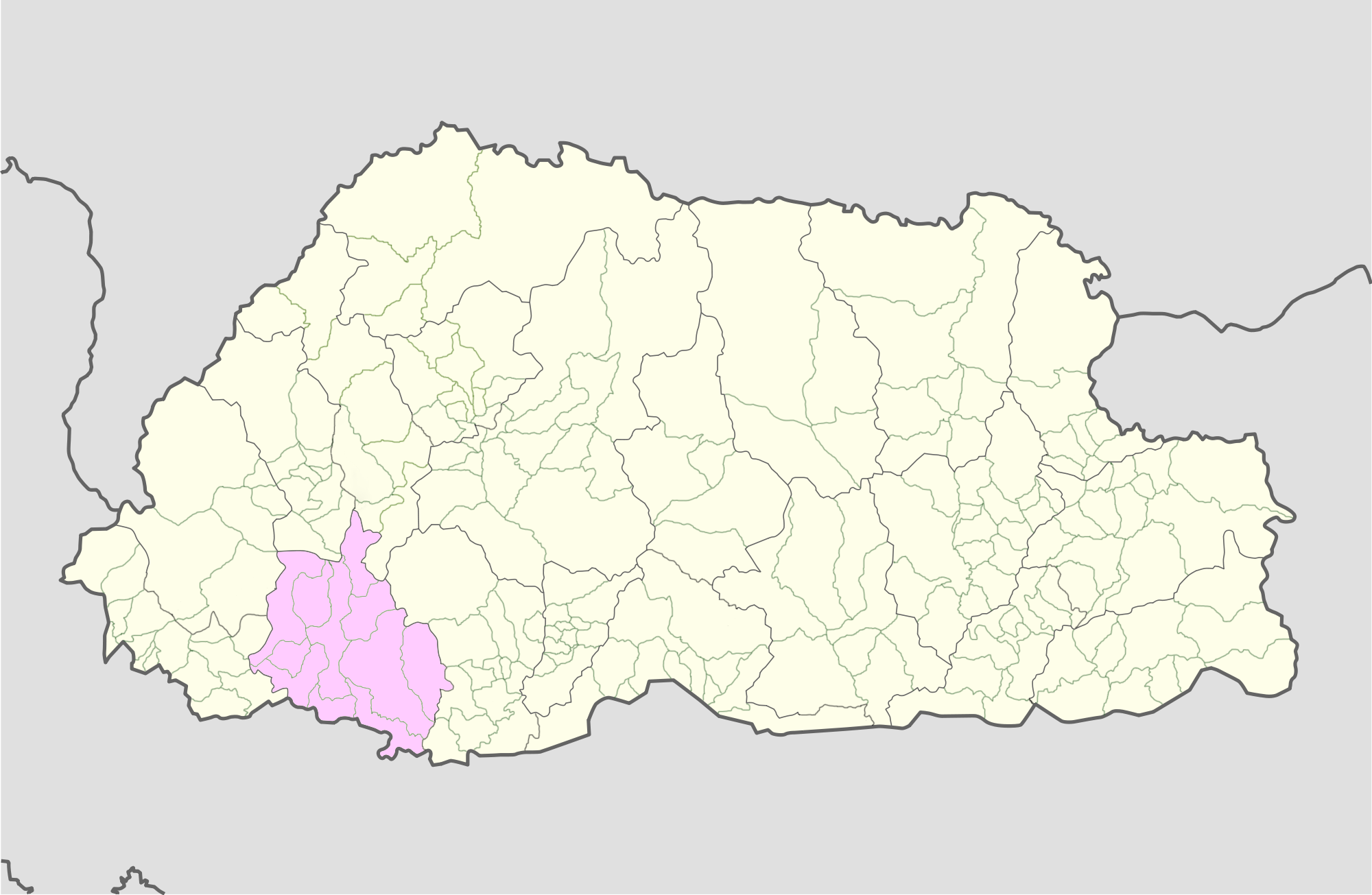
- Location within Chukha District
- Coordinates: 27°02′05″N 89°23′43″E
- Country: Bhutan
- District: Chukha District

Area
  - Total: 63.9 sq mi (165.4 km^{2})
- Time zone: UTC+6 (BTT)

Dungna Gewog (Dzongkha: གདུང་ན་, romanized: Doongna Gewog) is a gewog (village block) of Chukha District, Bhutan. The 165.4-km² gewog contains 9 villages.
