= Dala Gewog =

Dala Gewog དར་ལ་
- Gewogs
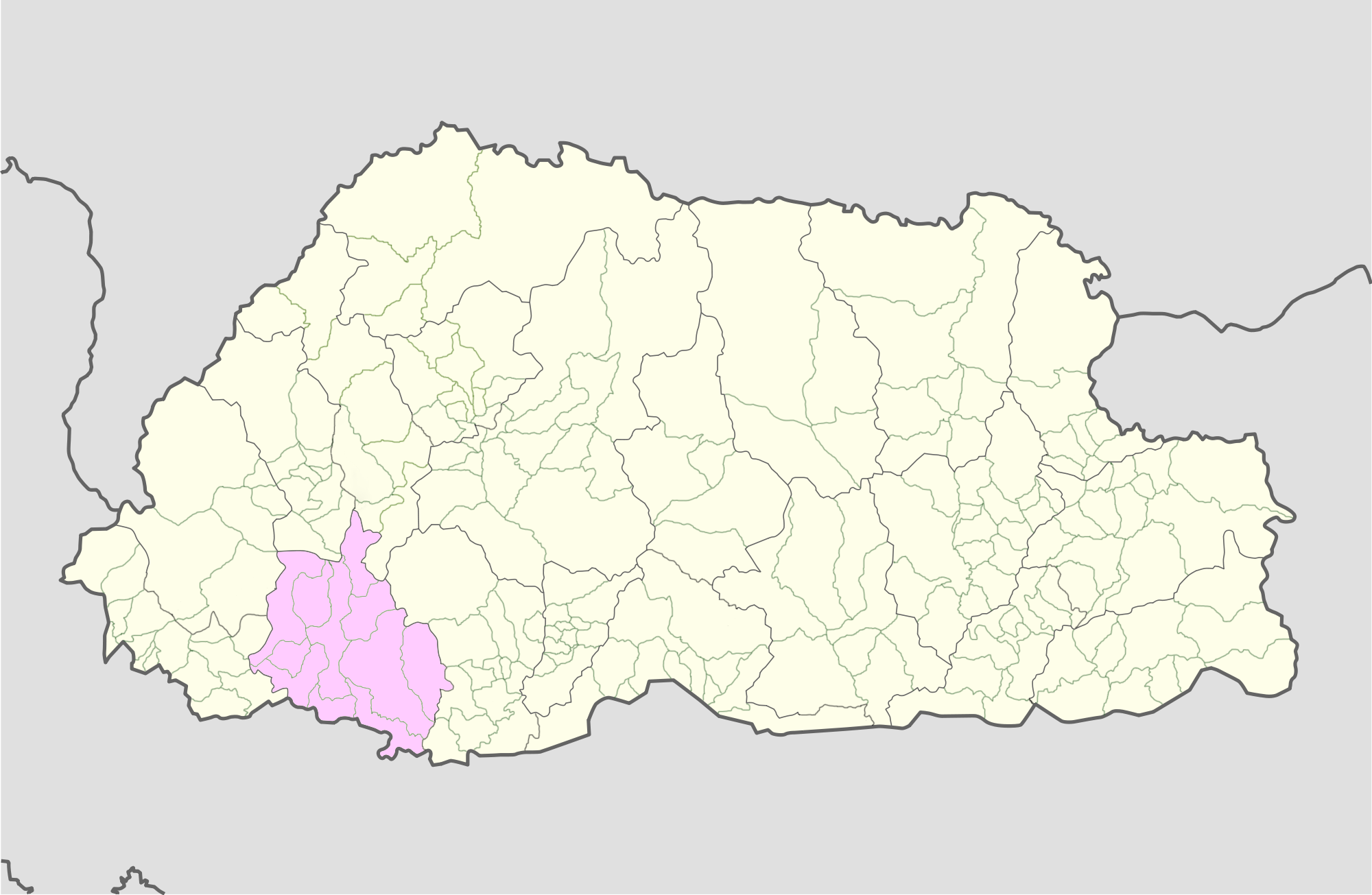
- Location within Chukha District
- Coordinates: 26°48′10″N 89°37′05″E
- Country: Bhutan
- District: Chukha District
- Sub-district: Phuentsholing Dungkhag

Area
  - Total: 53.9 sq mi (139.7 km^{2})
- Time zone: UTC+6 (BTT)

Dala Gewog (Dzongkha: དར་ལ་,Darla Gewog) is a gewog (village group) of Chukha District, Bhutan. The gewog has an area of around 140 km² and contains 7 villages. Dala gewog is part of Phuentsholing Dungkhag, along with Logchina and Phuentsholing gewogs.

== Dala Gewog ==
- Dala, Bhutan
