= Samrang Gewog =

Samrang Gewog བསམ་རང་
- Gewog
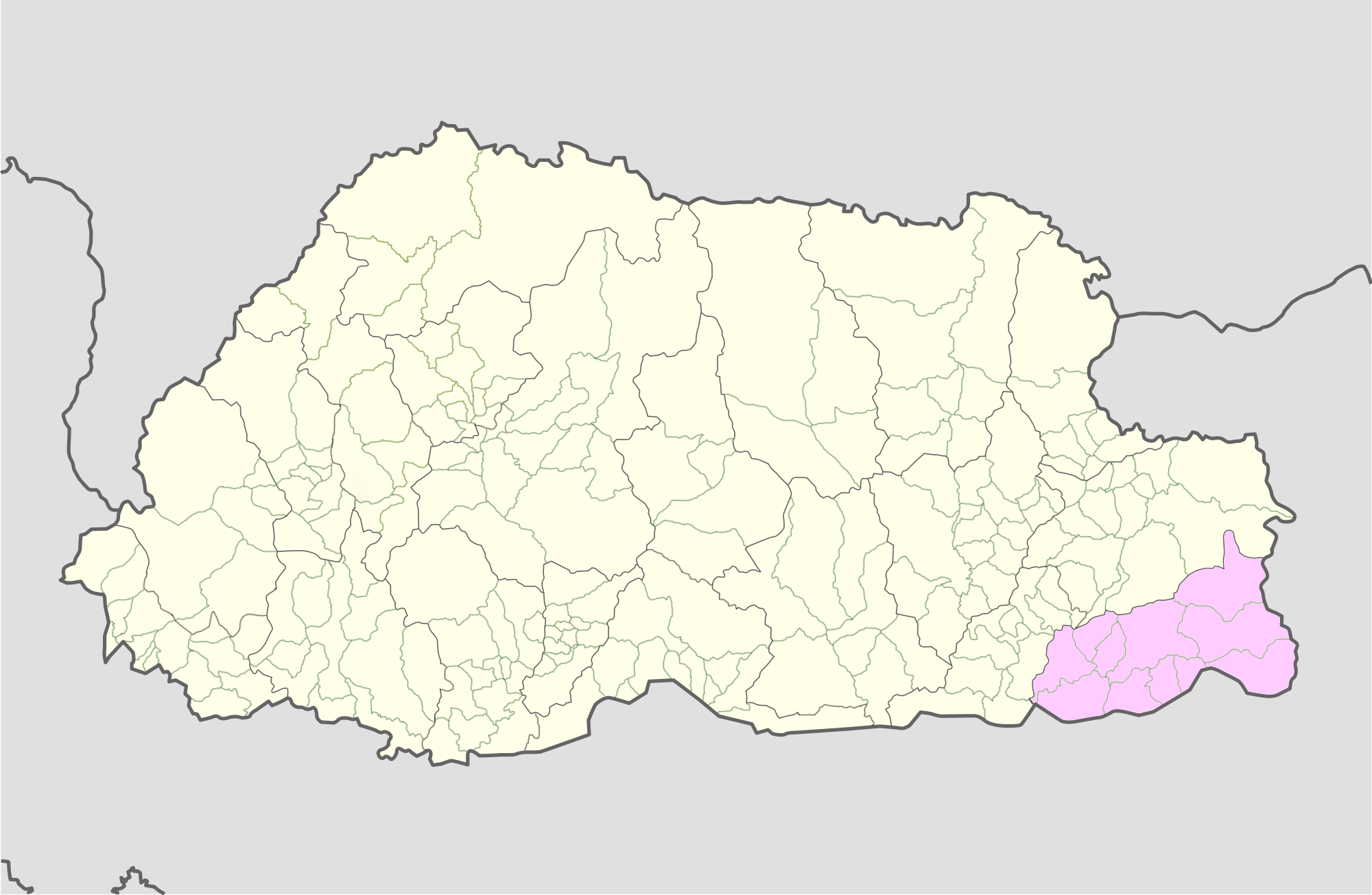
- Interactive map of Samrang Gewog
- Coordinates: 26.9075°N 91.8359°E
- Country: Bhutan
- District: Samdrup Jongkhar District
- Time zone: UTC+6 (BTT)

Samrang Gewog (Dzongkha: བསམ་རང་) is a gewog (village block) of Samdrup Jongkhar District, Bhutan. They also comprise part of Bhangtar Dungkhag, along with Martshala Gewog.

It stands as the most petite among the eleven gewogs in the Samdrup Jongkhar district, covering 51.25 square kilometers and hosting a mere 52 households at present.
