= Phuentsholing Gewog =

Phuentsholing Gewog ཕུན་ཚོགས་གླིང་
- Gewogs
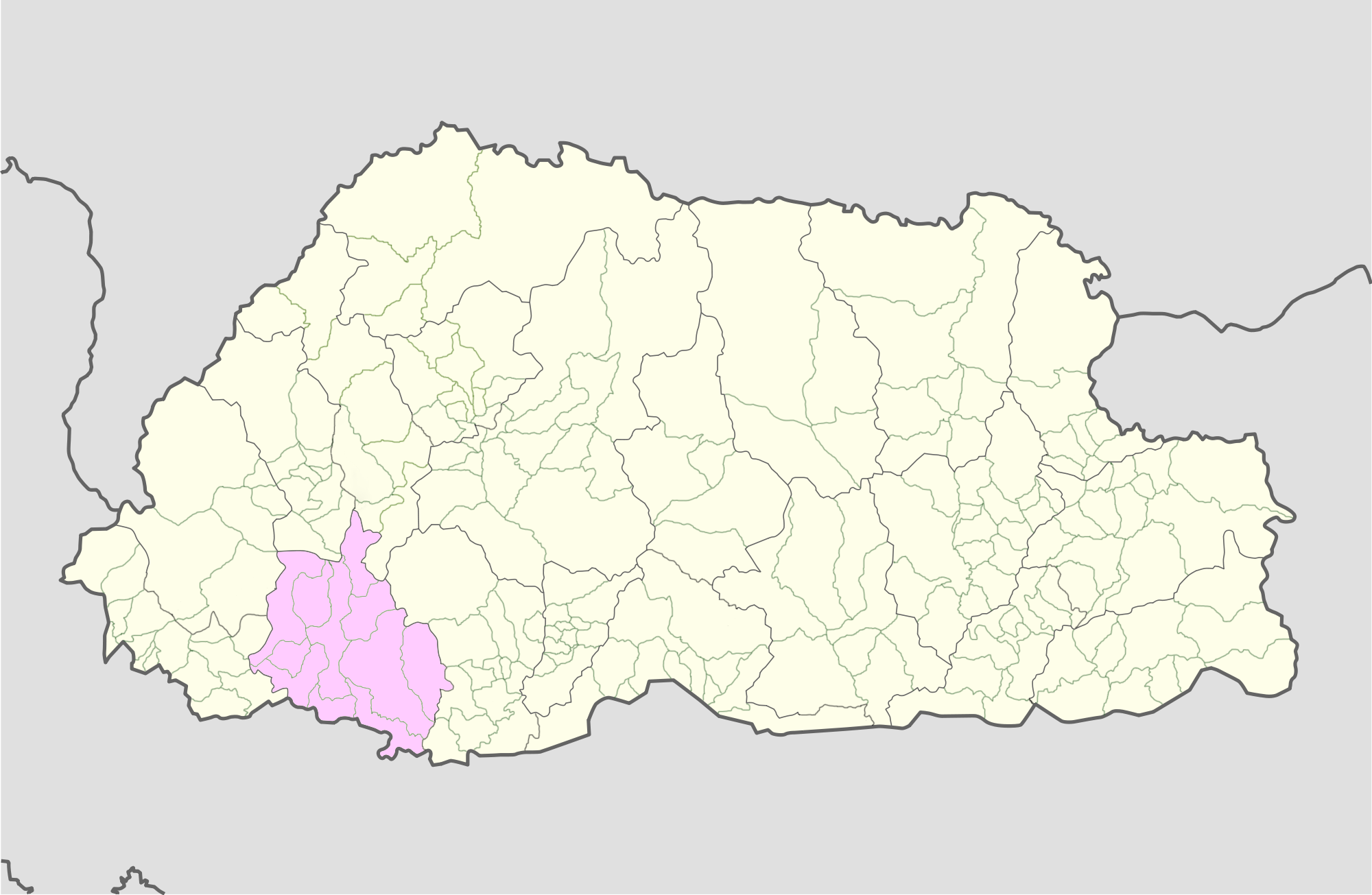
- Location within Chukha District
- Coordinates: 26°53′N 89°23′E
- Country: Bhutan
- District: Chukha District
- Sub-district: Phuentsholing Dungkhag

Government Chukha
  - Gup: Birkha Bdr Rai

Area
  - Total: 54.0 sq mi (139.8 km^{2})

Population (2005)
  - Total: 5,183
- Time zone: UTC+6 (BTT)

Phuentsholing Gewog (Dzongkha: ཕུན་ཚོགས་གླིང་, Phuentshogling Gewog) is a gewog (village block) of Chukha District, Bhutan. The gewog has an area of 139.8 km^{2} and contains 19 villages and a population of 5,183, as of 2005. Phuentsholing Gewog is part of Phuentsholing Dungkhag, along with Dala, Logchina Gewogs and Shampheling Gewog. It is one of the most populated gewogs in Chukha Dzongkhag.

The Gewog contains a number of sacred places including Rinchending Goenpa, Zangdo Pelri, and Druk Namgay Choling Dratshang.
