= Choekhorling Gewog =

Chokhorling Gewog ཆོས་འཁོར་གླིང་
- Gewog
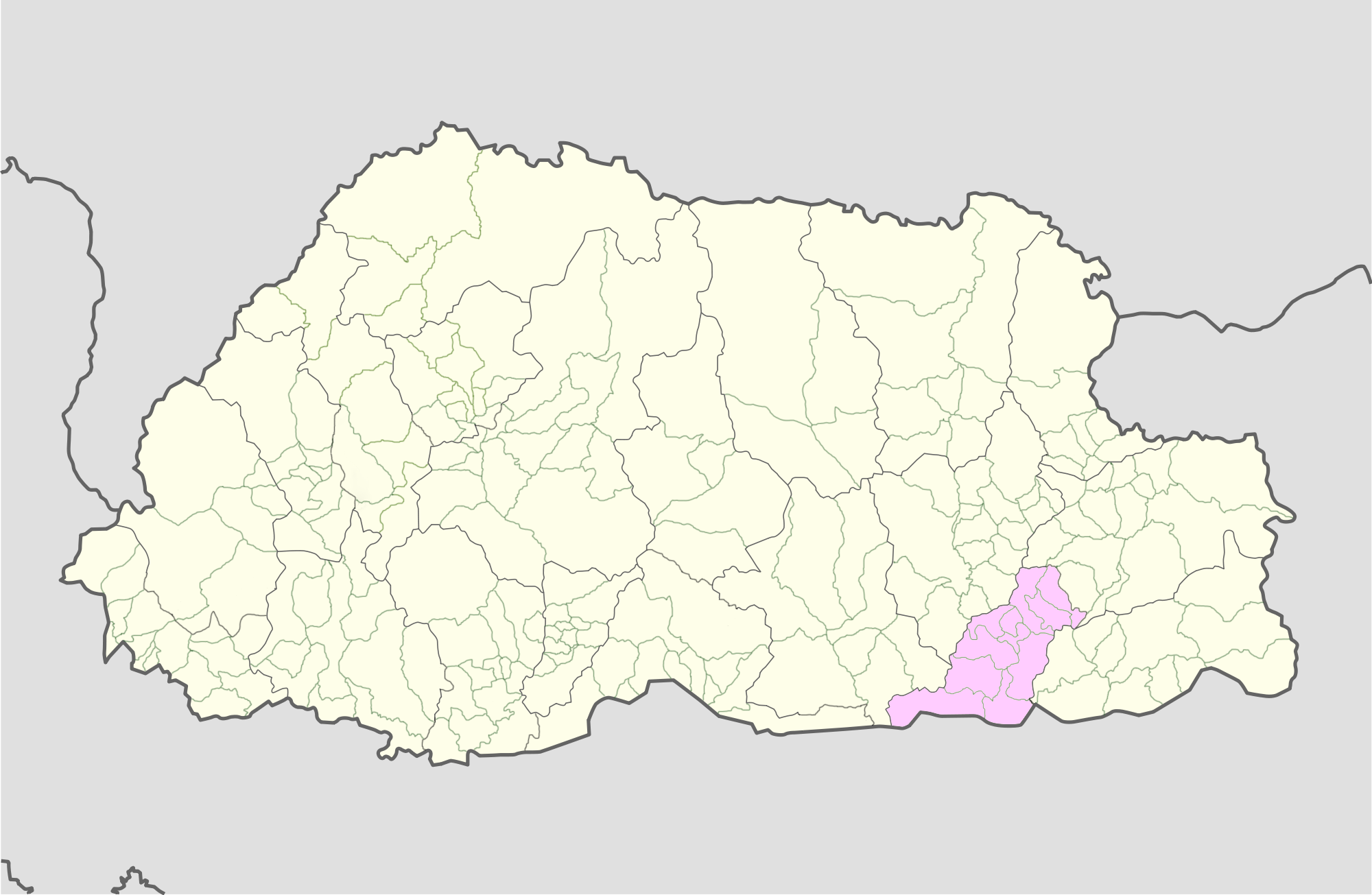
- Country: Bhutan
- District: Pemagatshel District
- Time zone: UTC+6 (BTT)

Chokhorling Gewog (Dzongkha: ཆོས་འཁོར་གླིང་) is a gewog (village block) of Pemagatshel District, Bhutan.
