= Samdrup Jongkhar District =

District of Bhutan

Coordinates: 26°55′N 91°37′E

Samdrup Jongkhar District བསམ་གྲུབ་ལྗོངས་མཁར་རྫོང་ཁག།
- District
- Location of Samdrup Jongkhar district within Bhutan
- Country: Bhutan
- Headquarters: Samdrup Jongkhar

Area
  - Total: 1,878 km^{2} (725 sq mi)

Population (2017)
  - Total: 35,079
  - Density: 18.68/km^{2} (48.38/sq mi)
- Time zone: UTC+6 (BTT)
- HDI (2019): 0.614 medium · 11th
- Website: www.samdrupjongkhar.gov.bt

Samdrup Jongkhar District (Dzongkha: བསམ་གྲུབ་ལྗོངས་མཁར་རྫོང་ཁག།; Wylie: Bsam-grub Ljongs-mkhar rdzong-khag) is one of the 20 dzongkhags (districts) in Bhutan. The dominant languages of the district are Tshangla (Sharchopkha) in the north and west, and Lhotsam in the east. The Sharchops are the early settlers of the district predating later Lhotshampa settlers. It covers a total area of 1878 sq km. Samdrup Jongkhar Dzongkhag comprises two Dungkhags which are Jomotsangkha and Samdrupcholing, and 11 Gewogs.

== Geography ==
Samdrup Jongkhar District is situated in the southeastern corner of Bhutan, sharing its southern and eastern borders with the Indian states of Assam and Arunachal Pradesh. It has an elevation range of 200 to 3600 meters above sea level. The district has sub-tropical climate zone, with temperature ranging from14 °C to 36 °C during the summer months and an average annual temperature of 23.8 °C. The average annual rainfall is 2749 mm.

== Vision ==
A self-reliant Dzongkhag co-existing in peace and harmony with enhanced socio-economic standards, rich natural resources and cultural heritage. (Dzongkha: ༉ དགའ་སྐྱིད་དང་མཐུན་འབྲེལ་ཐོག་ དཔལ་འབྱོར་གོང་འཕེལ་དང་རང་བཞིན་གནས་སྟངས་ དེ་ལས་ རང་ལུགས་ལམ་སྲོལ་དང་ལྡན་པའི་ རང་གིས་རང་ལངས་ཚུགས་པའི་ རྫོང་ཁག།).

== Mission ==
To enhance rural livelihood with good local governance in line with culture and environment. (Dzongkha: ༉ རང་བཞིན་གནས་སྟངས་དང་ རང་ལུགས་ལམ་སྲོལ་དང་མཐུན་སྟེ་ གྲོང་གསེབ་གོང་འཕེལ་དང་ ས་གནས་གཞུང་གོང་འཕེལ་གཏང་ནི།).

== Demographics ==
The population in 2017 was 35,079.

== Law and government ==
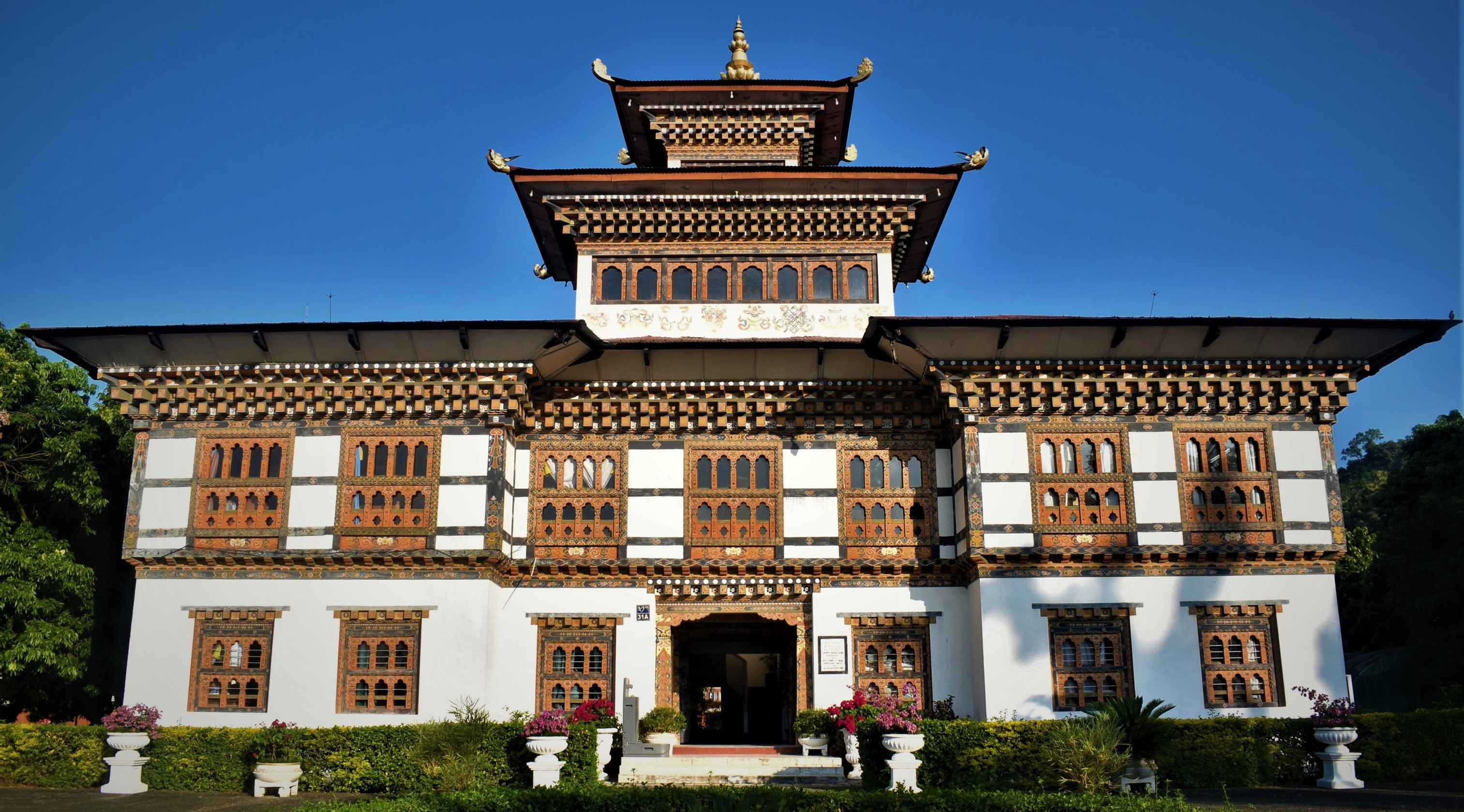
The Samdrup Jongkhar Dzong was inaugurated by H.E. Lyonpo T. Jagar, Honorable Home Minister on 24 November 1983.

Samdrup Jongkhar is subdivided into 2 sub-districts and 11 gewogs.

=== Dungkhag ===
- Samdrup Choling Drungkhag
- Jomotshangkha Dungkhag

=== Gewog ===
- Dewathang Gewog
- Gomdar Gewog
- Langchenphu Gewog
- Lauri Gewog
- Martshala Gewog
- Orong Gewog
- Pemathang Gewog
- Phuntshothang Gewog
- Tashithang Gewog
- Serthi Gewog
- Wangphu Gewog

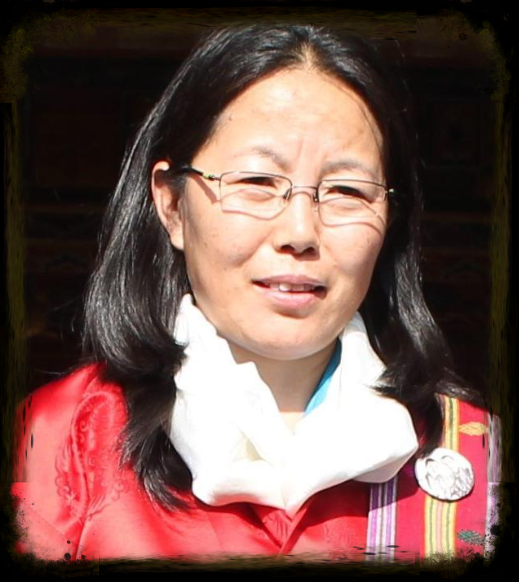
Dzongdag Tashi Wangmo

List of Samdrup Jongkhar Dzongdag
SN	Name	Year	Village
1	Dasho Karma Dorji	1976-1981	Ramjar Trashi Yangtse
2	Dasho Passang Tobhay	1981-1985	Samkhar Trashigang
3	Dasho Thuji Yonten	1985-1988	Jangsa Paro
4	Dasho Goenpo Tshering	1988-1989	Paro
5	Dasho Dorji Namgyal	1989-1991	Paro
6	Dasho Dorji Wangdi	1991-1997	Drametse Mongar
7	Dasho Palden Wangchuk	1997-2003	Wangduephodrang
8	Dasho Sangay Dorji	2003-2007	Trashi Yangtse
9	Dasho Phub Tshering	2007-2013	Paro
10	Dasho Goling Tshering	2013-2016	Goling Zhemgang
11	Dasho Tharchin Lhendup	2016-2022	Chumey Bumtang
12	Dasho Tashi Wangmo	2022 – 2025	Haa
13	Dasho Dorji Gyeltshen P	2026- Present	Lhuentse

== Economy ==
=== Tourism and entertainment ===
==== SAMJONG ====
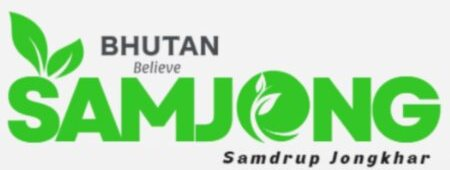
SAMJONG Brand Logo

SAMJONG, the brand of Samdrup Jongkhar District, was unveiled on June 23, 2023, with the purpose to champion local products and destinations. The custodian of this brand are the Rural Youth Processing and Marketing Enterprise, comprising enthusiastic youth from eleven gewogs.

=== Agriculture and livestock ===
Samdrup Jongkhar's mainstay cash crops include Areca nuts, Ginger, Garlic, Oranges, and Cardamom, has also introduced high-value crops like Quinoa and Avocado. A cereal, known as Khamtay is produced locally. In the livestock sector, various activities including aquaculture, apiculture, piggery, poultry, and sheep rearing.

There are 6 registered cooperatives and 47 farmers' groups. The majority of FGs are in the Agriculture Sector, followed by Livestock and then Forestry, with 41% in agriculture, 32% in livestock, and 18% in forestry.

Fruits Grown In Samdrup Jongkhar
SN	Fruits	Production (MT)	No. of Trees/Sown Area(Acre)
1	Apple	0.16	1285
2	Areca Nut	1604.64	366223
3	Mandarin	2377.95	207599
4	Watermelon	2.89	1.26
5	Dragon Fruit	0.09	546`
6	Mango	41.40	8954
7	Avacado	2.27	6741
8	Litchi	24.7	4537
9	Banana	164.58	4622
10	Papaya	11.54	955
11	Passion Fruit	4.86	452

Cereals Grown in Samdrup Jongkhar
SN	Cereals	Production (MT)	Sown Area (Acre)
1	Irrigated Paddy	2143.26	1395.7
2	upland paddy	5	26.98
3	Maize	2750.26	2138.03
4	Wheat	6.65	14.64
5	Buckwheat	334.53	614.54
7	Barley	29.43	53.97
8	Millet	34.63	78.44
9	Quinoa	1.25	2.80

=== Mining ===
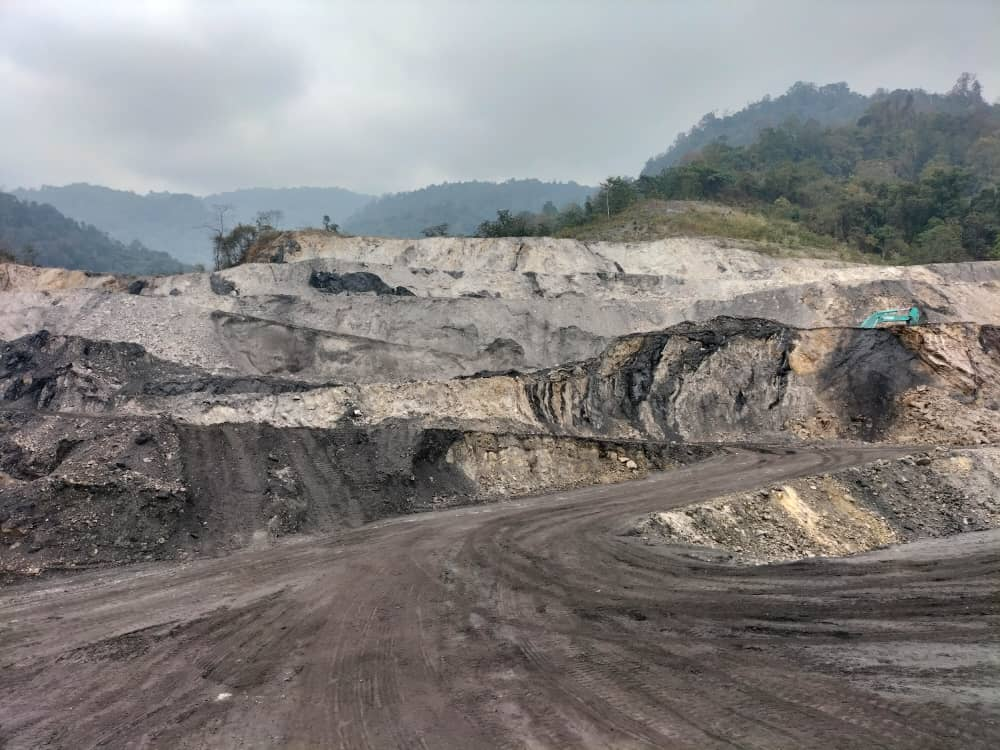
Tshophangma Coal Mine

Samdrup Jongkhar has various coal mines, which play a significant role in the region's economy.

List of mines
SN	Mine Names	Promoter	Location
1	Habrang Coal Mine	SMCL	Khatoethang, Phuntshothang
2	Tshopama Coal Mine	SMCL	Tshophagma, Martsala
3	Majuwa Coal Mine	SMCL	Tsholingkhar, Phuntshothang
4	Reshore Coal Mine	SMCL	Reshore, Doethang

== Culture ==
=== Samdrup Jongkhar Tsechu ===
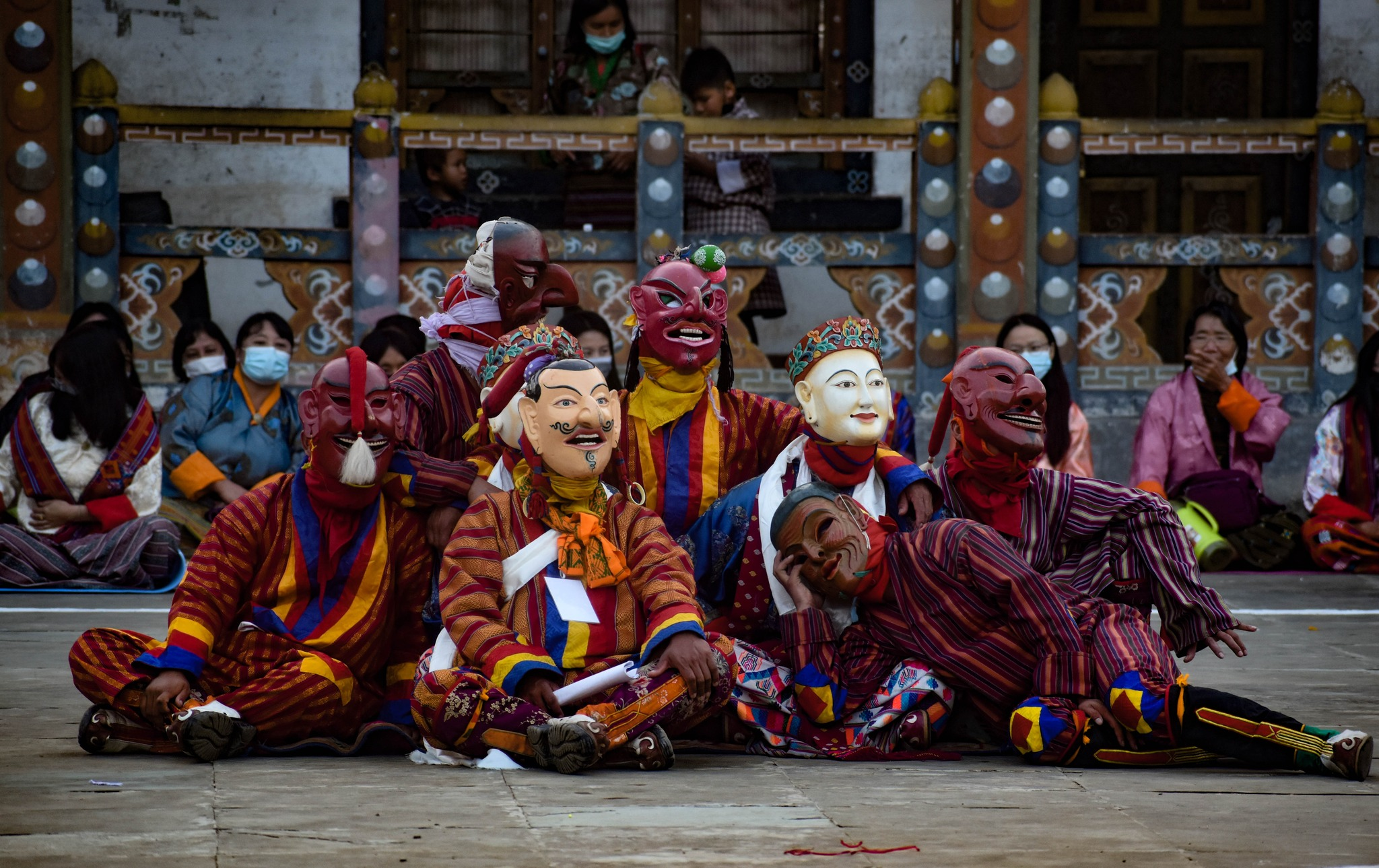
Samdrup Jongkhar Tsechu

The Samdrup Jongkhar Tshechu is held annually from the 13th to the 15th of the eleventh month of the Bhutanese calendar. An three-day event features performances by Rabdey monks and dzongkhag dancers, presenting a variety of mask dances and cultural showcases. The Tshechu reaches its climax with the unveiling of the Guru Tshengey Thongdrel.

=== Sites ===
==== Chökyi Gyatso Institute ====
Located in Dewathang. A small temple constructed by Dzongsar Khyentse Rinpoche’s maternal grandfather, Lama Sonam Zangpo. Following a ten-year renovation, the monastery began its final phase of reconstruction in 2015.

==== Bhairab Kunda Shiva Mandir ====
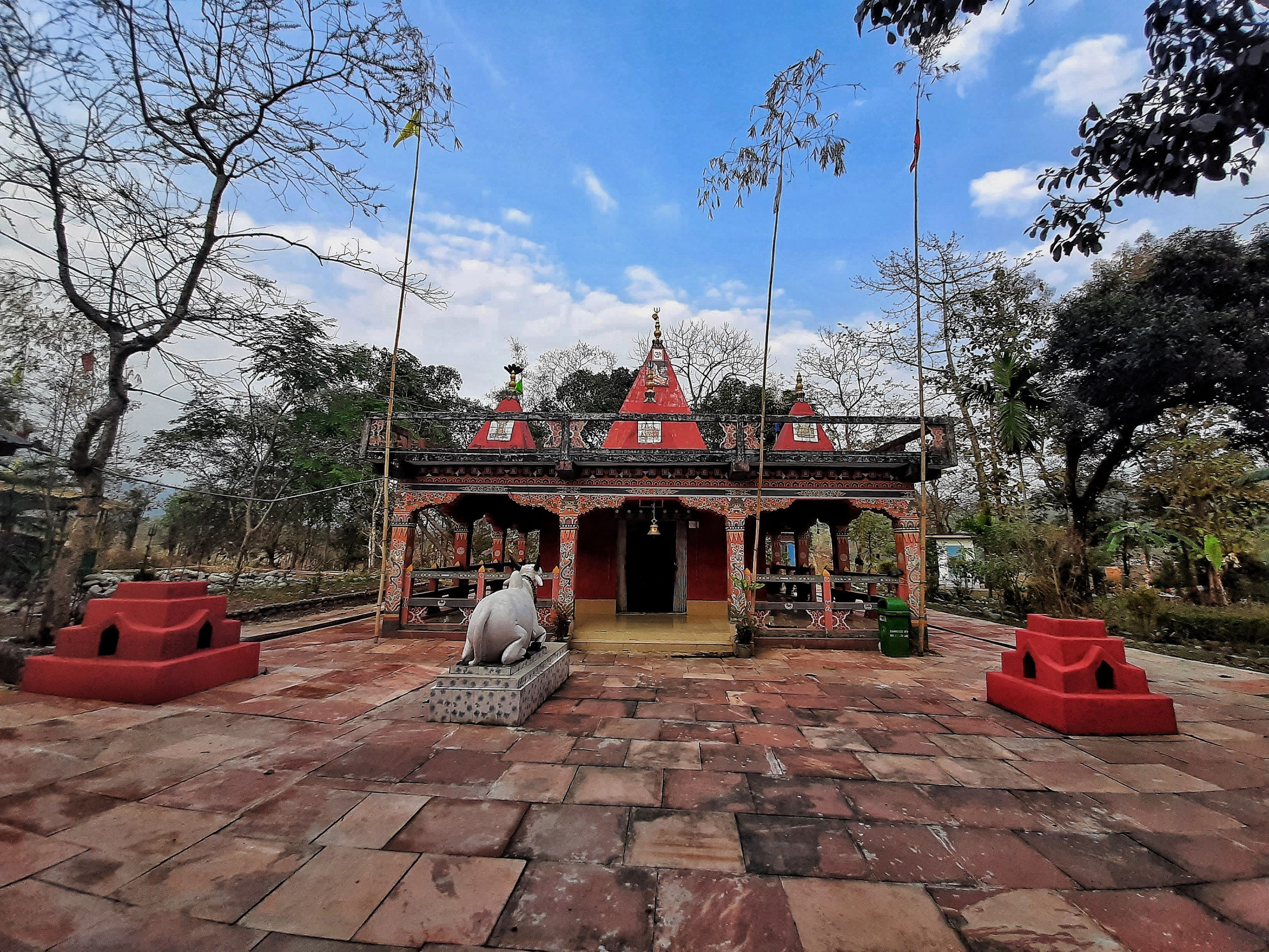
Bhairab Kunda Shiva Mandir

The Shiva Mandir at Jomotsangkha, and the only Shakta pitha in Bhutan. Its a major Hindu site. There is a self-arisen lake with linga beside the cave.

==== Narphu-Samdrupjongkhar birding route ====
Located about sixty kilometers away from the main town, the area near the mirror cliff (melong brak) is a sub-tropical forest with a warm climate and a variety of broadleaf trees. Making a popular place for birdwatching, as it's home to approximately 360 different bird species, such as the Beautiful Nuthatch, Crimson Sunbird, Asian Emerald Cuckoo, Greater Goldenback, Ruby-cheeked Sunbird, and White-browed Scimitar Babbler.

==== Dungsam Community Seed Bank ====
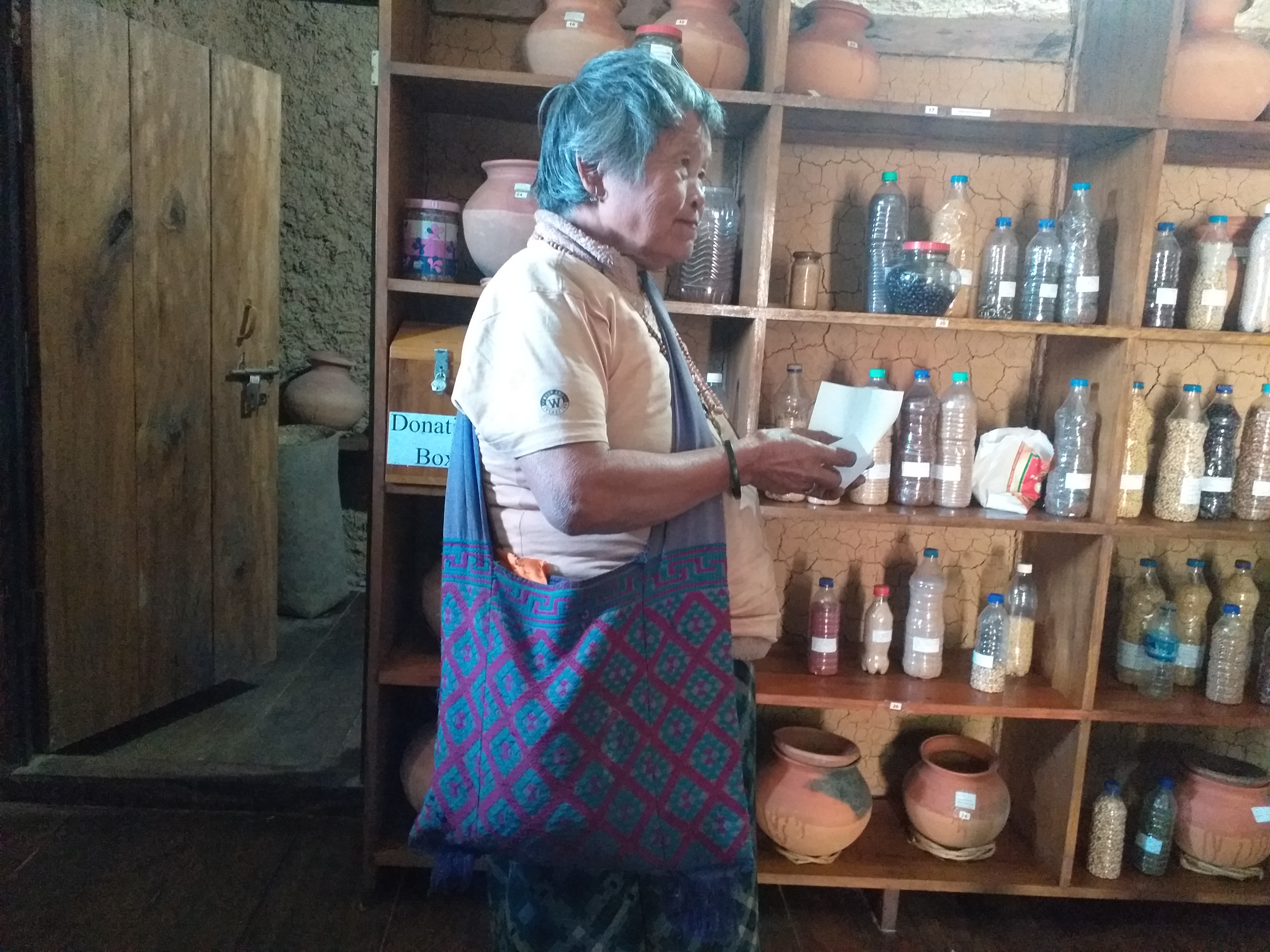
Dungsam Seed Bank

A seed bank in Dewathang established by Samdrup Jongkhar Initiative (SJI), the Chokyi Gyatso Institute to preserve local cereals.

== Protected areas ==
Jomotsangkha Wildlife Sanctuary (formerly Khaling Wildlife Sanctuary) is the smallest protected area in Bhutan, covering 334.73 square kilometers (129.24 sq mi) in Samdrup Jongkhar District along the southern border with Assam. Its elevations range between 400 and 2,200 metres (1,300 and 7,200 ft). Despite its small size, Khaling Wildlife Sanctuary is an important habitat for elephants, gaur (Bos gaurus), and other tropical wildlife. It may also contain the rare pygmy hog (Porcula salvania) and hispid hare (Caprolagus hispidus), known to inhabit the adjacent Khaling Reserve in Assam, with which Khaling Wildlife Sanctuary forms a trans-border reserve.

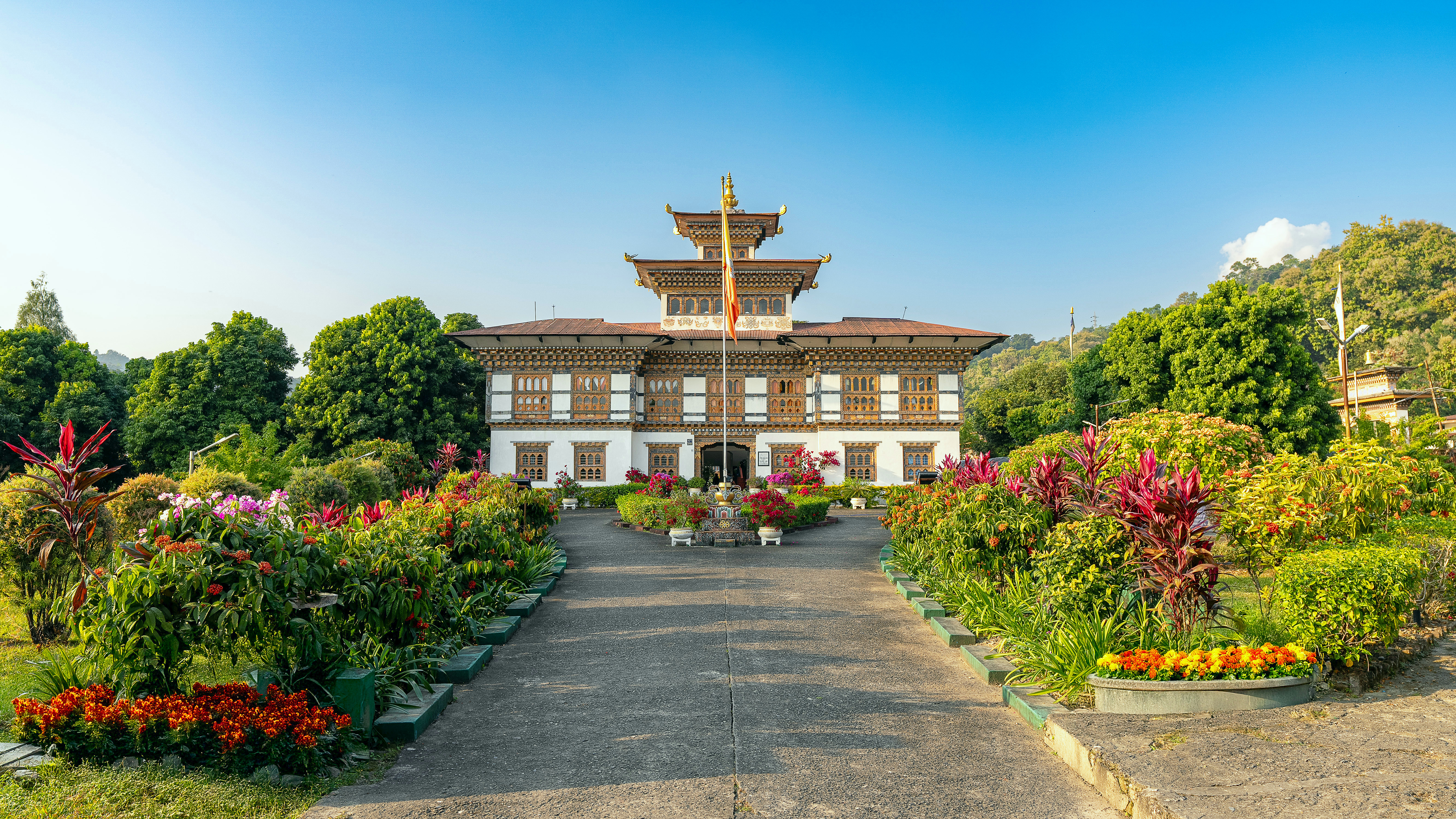
Dzongkhag Administration Office, Samdrup Jongkhar: Bhutan's Gateway to Governance and Tradition

== See also ==
- Districts of Bhutan
- Kurmaed Province
