= Gewogs of Bhutan =

Group of villages in Bhutan

A gewog (Dzongkha: རྒེད་འོག geok, block), in the past also spelled as geog, is a group of villages in Bhutan. The head of a gewog is called a gup (རྒེད་པོ་ gepo). Gewogs form a geographic administrative unit below dzongkhag districts (and dungkhag subdistricts, where they exist), and above Dzongkhag Thromde class B and Yenlag Thromde municipalities. Dzongkhag Thromde class A municipalities have their own independent local government body.

Bhutan comprises 205 gewogs, which average 230 km^{2} (89 sq mi) in area. The gewogs in turn are divided into chewogs for elections and thromdes "municipalities" for administration. The Parliament of Bhutan passed legislation in 2002 and 2007 on the status, structure, and leadership of local governments, including gewogs. The most recent legislation by parliament regarding gewogs is the Local Government Act of Bhutan 2009. In July 2011, the government slated 11 gewogs across Bhutan for reorganization, including both mergers and bifurcations, to be debated in dzongkhag local governments. These changes are contemplated to promote ease of travel to gewog capitals and to equitably allocate development resources.

== Gewog administration ==
Under the Local Government Act of 2009, each gewog is administered by a Gewog Tshogde (gewog council), subordinate to the Dzongkhag Tshogdu (district council). The Gewog Tshogde is composed of a Gup (headman), Mangmi (deputy), and between five and eight democratically elected Tshogpas from among villages or village groups. All representatives serve five-year terms, unless the local electorate petitions for an election (by a simple majority of the voting population) to vote no confidence in the local government (by at least two-thirds of the voting population). Representatives must be citizens between the ages of 25 and 65, be a resident of their constituency for at least one year, gain certification by the Election Commission, and otherwise qualify under Electoral Law.

While the Gewog Tshogde has powers to regulate resources, manage public health and safety, and levy taxes on land, grazing, cattle, entertainment, and utilities, the gewog administration and all other local governments are prohibited to pass laws. The gewog administration has jurisdiction over roads, buildings (including architecture), recreational areas, utilities, agriculture, and the formulation of local five-year development plans. The Gewog Tshogde also prepares, reports, and expends its own gewog's budget under the supervision and approval of the Minister of Finance.

== History ==
Gewogs of Bhutan ahead of local government elections, 2011

Beginning in the late 1980s, the King of Bhutan, Jigme Singye Wangchuck pursued a long-term programme of decentralization. In 1991, following this principle, the King enacted the first Geog Yargay Tshogchung as a framework for local administration. Under the first Geog Yargay Tshochung, gewogs became official administrative units, each headed by a Gup or headman. The first-ever elections in Bhutan were held at that time, with a representative from each household voting to select their local Gup.

In 2002, the Parliament of Bhutan enacted a second, more comprehensive Chathrim (Act) also called the Geog Yargay Tshochung. Under the Geog Yargay Tshochung of 2002, gewog administration included the Gup, Mangmi (deputy), Tshogpa (village or village cluster representative), and the non-voting Chupon (village messenger) and Gewog Clerk. Gup and Mangmi sat for three-year terms while normal representatives sat for one year. The body had a two-thirds quorum requirement, and voted by simple majority. The Chathrim of 2002 empowered gewogs to levy rural taxes, maintain and regulate natural resources, and manage community and cultural life.

The Chathrim of 2002 was superseded by the Local Government Act of 2007, which expanded local bureaucracy and vested more powers in gewog administrators, including enforcement of driglam namzha. Under the Act of 2007, additional levels of local administration were carved out from gewogs, namely Dzongkhag Thromde Tshogdes and Gyelyong Thromde Tshogdus. The former were democratically elected bodies under direct dzongkhag management; the latter were democratic autonomous urban areas, or special cities, independent of dzongkhag management. Up through the enactment of the Local Government Act of 2009, gewogs were subdivided administratively into chiwogs, comprising several villages.

Since the Act of 2009, Dzongkhag Thromde Tshogdes, Gyelyong Thromde Tshogdus, and chiwogs have been replaced by thromdes (municipalities) as tertiary administrative divisions. Depending on the population and development of each thromde, it either has an independent bureaucracy ("Class A" Thromdes) or is directly administered by the gewog or dzongkhag ("Class B" and "Dzongkhag Yenlag" Thromdes).

=== Gewog changes since 2000 ===
In 2002, there were 199 gewogs in Bhutan's 20 dzongkhags; by 2005, there were 205.

In Tsirang District, Chanautey, Gairigaun, Tshokhana, and Tsirang Dangra Gewogs were disestablished; in the meanwhile Barshong, Rangthangling, Tsholingkhar, and Tsirangtoe Gewogs were created. Likewise, in Sarpang District, Sarpangtar Gewog was disestablished. Chukha District no longer contains Bhulajhora Gewog, but now contains Sampheling Gewog. Samtse District no longer contains Ghumauney, Mayona, and Nainital Gewogs; it now contains Ugentse and Yoeseltse Gewogs. In Thimphu District, Bapbi Gewog disappeared. In Samdrup Jongkhar District, Bakuli and Hastinapur Gewogs disappeared, replaced by Dewathang, Langchenphu, Pemathang, Phuntshothang, Serthi, and Wangphu Gewogs. Trashiyangtse District saw the creation of three additional gewogs: Bumdeling, Khamdang, and Ramjar.

Since 2005, gewogs and dzongkhags have continued to evolve. On April 26, 2007, Lhamozingkha Dungkhag (subdistrict) was formally transferred from Sarpang Dzongkhag to Dagana Dzongkhag, affecting the town of Lhamozingkha and three constituent gewogs – Lhamoy Zingkha, Deorali and Nichula (Zinchula) – that formed the westernmost part of Sarpang and now form the southernmost part of Dagana.

== The gewogs of Bhutan ==
The following is a list of 205 gewogs of Bhutan by dzongkhag in alphabetical order:

| Dzongkhag | Gewog |
|---|---|
| Bumthang | Chhoekhor (1) ཆོས་འཁོར་ |
| Bumthang | Chhume (2) ཆུ་མིག་ |
| Bumthang | Tang (3) སྟང་ |
| Bumthang | Ura (4) ཨུ་ར་ |
| Chhukha | Bjachho བྱག་ཕྱོགས་ |
| Chhukha | Bongo སྦོང་སྒོར་ |
| Chhukha | Chapcha སྐྱབས་ཆ་ |
| Chhukha | Darla དར་ལ་ |
| Chhukha | Dungna གདུང་ན་ |
| Chhukha | Geling དགེ་གླིང་ |
| Chhukha | Getana གད་སྟག་ན་ |
| Chhukha | Lokchina ལོག་ཅི་ན་ |
| Chhukha | Metakha སྨད་བཏབ་ཁ་ |
| Chhukha | Phuentsholing ཕུན་ཚོགས་གླིང་ |
| Chhukha | Sampheling བསམ་འཕེལ་གླིང་ |
| Dagana | Dorona རྡོ་རོ་ན་ |
| Dagana | Drujegang འབྲུག་རྗེས་སྒང་ |
| Dagana | Gesarling གེ་སར་གླིང་ |
| Dagana | Goshi སྒོ་བཞི་ |
| Dagana | Kana བཀར་ན་ |
| Dagana | Karmaling ཀརྨ་གླིང་ |
| Dagana | Khebisa ཁེ་སྦིས་ས་ |
| Dagana | Lajab ལ་རྒྱབ་ |
| Dagana | Lhamoi Zingkha ལྷ་མོའི་རྫིང་ཁ་ |
| Dagana | Nichula ནི་ཅུ་ལ་ |
| Dagana | Trashiding བཀྲིས་ལྡིང་ |
| Dagana | Tsangkha གཙང་ཁ་ |
| Dagana | Tsendagang བཙན་མདའ་སྒང་ |
| Dagana | Tseza བརྩེ་ཟ་ |
| Gasa | Khamaed ཁ་སྨད་ |
| Gasa | Khatoe ཁ་སྟོད་ |
| Gasa | Laya ལ་ཡ་ |
| Gasa | Lunana ལུང་ནག་ན་ |
| Haa | Bji སྦྱིས་ |
| Haa | Gakiling དགའ་སྐྱིད་གླིང་ |
| Haa | Katsho སྐར་ཚོགས་ |
| Haa | Samar ས་དམར་ |
| Haa | Sangbay གསང་སྦས་ |
| Haa | Uesu དབུས་སུ་ |
| Lhuentse | Gangzur སྒང་ཟུར་ |
| Lhuentse | Khoma མཁོ་མ་ |
| Lhuentse | Jarey རྒྱ་རས་ |
| Lhuentse | Kurtoed ཀུར་སྟོད་ |
| Lhuentse | Menbi སྨན་སྦིས་ |
| Lhuentse | Metsho སྨད་མཚོ་ |
| Lhuentse | Minjay སྨིན་རྒྱས་ |
| Lhuentse | Tsenkhar སཙན་མཁར་ |
| Mongar | Balam བ་ལམ་ |
| Mongar | Chali ཅ་གླིང་ |
| Mongar | Chaskhar ལྕགས་ས་མཁར་ |
| Mongar | Drametse དགྲ་མེད་རྩེ་ |
| Mongar | Drepong འབྲེས་སྤུངས་ |
| Mongar | Gongdue དགོངས་འདུས་ |
| Mongar | Jurmey འགྱུར་མེད་ |
| Mongar | Kengkhar སྐྱེངས་མཁར་ |
| Mongar | Mongar མོང་སྒར་ |
| Mongar | Narang ན་རང་ |
| Mongar | Ngatshang སྔ་ཚང་ |
| Mongar | Saling ས་གླིང་ |
| Mongar | Shermuhoong ཤེར་མུ་ཧཱུྃ་ |
| Mongar | Silambi སི་ལམ་སྦི་ |
| Mongar | Thangrong ཐང་རོང་ |
| Mongar | Tsakaling ཙ་ཀ་གླིང་ |
| Mongar | Tsamang རྩ་མང་ |
| Paro | Dokar རྡོ་དཀར་ |
| Paro | Dopshari རྡོབ་ཤར་རི་ |
| Paro | Doteng རྡོ་སྟེང་ |
| Paro | Hungrel ཧཱུྃ་རལ་ |
| Paro | Lamgong ལམ་གོང་ |
| Paro | Lungnyi ལུང་གཉིས་ |
| Paro | Naja ན་རྒྱ་ |
| Paro | Shapa ཤར་པ་ |
| Paro | Tsento བཙན་ཏོ་ |
| Paro | Wangchang ཝང་ལྕང་ |
| Pema Gatshel | Chimoong ཕྱི་མུང་ |
| Pema Gatshel | Chokhorling ཆོས་འཁོར་གླིང་ |
| Pema Gatshel | Chongshing ལྕོང་ཤིང་ |
| Pema Gatshel | Dechheling བདེ་ཆེན་གླིང་ |
| Pema Gatshel | Dungmaed གདུང་སྨད་ |
| Pema Gatshel | Khar མཁར་ |
| Pema Gatshel | Nanong ན་ནོང་ |
| Pema Gatshel | Norbugang ནོར་བུ་སྒང་ |
| Pema Gatshel | Shumar ཤུ་མར་ |
| Pema Gatshel | Yurung ཡུ་རུང་ |
| Pema Gatshel | Zobel བཟོ་སྦལ་ |
| Punakha | Barp བརཔ་ |
| Punakha | Chhubug ཆུ་སྦུག་ |
| Punakha | Dzomi འཅོམས་མི་ |
| Punakha | Goenshari དགོམ་ཤ་རི་ |
| Punakha | Guma གུ་མ་ |
| Punakha | Kabisa དཀར་སྦི་ས་ |
| Punakha | Lingmukha གླིང་མུ་ཁ་ |
| Punakha | Shenga Bjemi ཤེལ་རྔ་_སྦྱེ་མི་ |
| Punakha | Talog རྟ་ལོག་ |
| Punakha | Toepisa སཏོད་པའི་ས་ |
| Punakha | Toewang སྟོད་ཝང་ |
| Samdrup Jongkhar | Dewathang དབེ་བ་ཐང་ |
| Samdrup Jongkhar | Gomdar སྒམ་དར་ |
| Samdrup Jongkhar | Langchenphu གླང་ཅན་ཕུ་ |
| Samdrup Jongkhar | Lauri ལའུ་རི་ |
| Samdrup Jongkhar | Martshala མར་ཚྭ་ལ་ |
| Samdrup Jongkhar | Orong ཨོ་རོང་ |
| Samdrup Jongkhar | Pemathang པདྨ་ཐང་ |
| Samdrup Jongkhar | Phuntshothang ཕུན་ཚོགས་ཐང་ |
| Samdrup Jongkhar | Samrang བསམ་རང་ |
| Samdrup Jongkhar | Serthi གསེར་ཐིག་ |
| Samdrup Jongkhar | Wangphu ཝང་ཕུག་ |

| Dzongkhag | Gewog |
|---|---|
| Samtse | Dungtoe གདུང་སྟོད་ |
| Samtse | Dophoogchen རྡོ་ཕུག་ཅན་ |
| Samtse | Duenchukha བདུམ་ཅུ་ཁ་ |
| Samtse | Namgaychhoeling རྣམ་རྒྱས་ཆོས་གླིང་ |
| Samtse | Norbugang ནོར་བུ་སྒང་ |
| Samtse | Norgaygang ནོར་རྒྱས་སྒང་ |
| Samtse | Pemaling པདྨ་གླིང་ |
| Samtse | Phuentshogpelri ཕུན་ཚོགས་དབལ་རི་ |
| Samtse | Samtse བསམ་རྩེ་ |
| Samtse | Sangngagchhoeling གསང་སྔགས་ཆོས་གླིང་ |
| Samtse | Tading རྟ་སྡིང་ |
| Samtse | Tashicholing བཀྲིས་ཙོས་གླིང་ |
| Samtse | Tendruk བསྟང་འབྲུག |
| Samtse | Ugentse ཨྱོན་རྩེ་ |
| Samtse | Yoeseltse འོད་གསལ་རྩེ་ |
| Sarpang | Chhuzagang ཆུ་འཛག་སྒང་ |
| Sarpang | Chhudzom ཆུ་འཛོམས་ |
| Sarpang | Dekiling བདེ་སྐྱིད་གླིང་ |
| Sarpang | Gakiling དགའ་སྐྱིད་གླིང་ |
| Sarpang | Gelephu དགེ་ལེགས་ཕུ་ |
| Sarpang | Jigmechholing འཇིགས་མེད་ཆོས་གླིང་ |
| Sarpang | Samtenling བསམ་གཏན་གླིང་ |
| Sarpang | Senggey སེ་ངྒེ་ |
| Sarpang | Sherzhong གསེར་གཞོང་ |
| Sarpang | Shompangkha ཤོམ་སྤང་ཁ་ |
| Sarpang | Tareythang རྟ་རས་ཐང་ |
| Sarpang | Umling ཨུམ་གླིང་ |
| Thimphu | Chang ལྕང་ |
| Thimphu | Darkala དར་དཀར་ལ་ |
| Thimphu | Genye དགེ་བསྙེན་ |
| Thimphu | Kawang ཀ་ཝང་ |
| Thimphu | Lingzhi གླིང་གཞི་ |
| Thimphu | Mewang སྨད་ཝང་ |
| Thimphu | Naro ན་རོ་ |
| Thimphu | Soe སྲོས་ |
| Trashigang | Bartsham བར་མཚམས་ |
| Trashigang | Bidung སྦིས་གདུང་ |
| Trashigang | Kanglung བཀང་ལུང་ |
| Trashigang | Kangpar རྐང་པར་ |
| Trashigang | Khaling ཁ་གླིང་ |
| Trashigang | Lumang ཀླུ་མང་ |
| Trashigang | Merag མེ་རག་ |
| Trashigang | Phongmed ཕོངས་མེད་ |
| Trashigang | Radi ར་དི་ |
| Trashigang | Sagteng སག་སྟེང་ |
| Trashigang | Samkhar བསམ་མཁར་ |
| Trashigang | Shongphoog ཤོང་ཕུག་ |
| Trashigang | Thrimshing ཁྲིམས་ཤིང་ |
| Trashigang | Uzorong ཨུ་མཛོ་རོང་ |
| Trashigang | Yangnyer ཡངས་ཉེར་ |
| Trashi Yangtse | Bumdeling བུམ་སྡེ་གླིང་ |
| Trashi Yangtse | Jamkhar འཇམ་མཁར་ |
| Trashi Yangtse | Khamdang ཁམས་དྭངས་ |
| Trashi Yangtse | Ramjar རམ་སྦྱར་ |
| Trashi Yangtse | Toetsho སྟོད་མཚོ་ |
| Trashi Yangtse | Tomzhang སྟོང་མི་གཞང་ས་ |
| Trashi Yangtse | Yalang ཡ་ལང་ |
| Trashi Yangtse | Yangtse གཡང་རྩེ་ |
| Trongsa | Dragteng བྲག་སྟེང་ |
| Trongsa | Korphoog སྐོར་ཕུག་ |
| Trongsa | Langthil གླང་མཐིལ་ |
| Trongsa | Nubi ནུ་སྦིས་ |
| Trongsa | Tangsibji སྟང་སི་སྦྱིས་ |
| Tsirang | Barshong བར་གཤོང་ |
| Tsirang | Dunglegang དུང་ལ་སྒང་ |
| Tsirang | Gosarling སྒོ་གསར་གླིང་ |
| Tsirang | Kikhorthang དཀྱིལ་འཁོར་ཐང་ |
| Tsirang | Mendrelgang མནྜལ་སྒང་ |
| Tsirang | Patshaling པ་ཚ་གླིང་ |
| Tsirang | Phuntenchu སྤུང་རྟེན་ཆུ་ |
| Tsirang | Rangthangling རང་ཐང་གླིང་ |
| Tsirang | Semjong སེམས་ལྗོངས་ |
| Tsirang | Sergithang གསེར་གྱི་ཐང་ |
| Tsirang | Tsholingkhar མཚོ་གླིང་མཁར་ |
| Tsirang | Tsirangtoe རྩི་རང་སྟོད་ |
| Wangdue Phodrang | Athang ཨ་ཐང་ |
| Wangdue Phodrang | Bjendag སྦྱེད་ནག་ |
| Wangdue Phodrang | Darkar དར་དཀར་ |
| Wangdue Phodrang | Dangchu དྭངས་ཆུ་ |
| Wangdue Phodrang | Gangteng སྒང་སྟེང་ |
| Wangdue Phodrang | Gasetsho Gom དགའ་སེང་ཚོ་གོངམ་ |
| Wangdue Phodrang | Gasetsho Wom དགའ་སེང་ཆོ་འོགམ་ |
| Wangdue Phodrang | Kazhi ཀ་གཞི་ |
| Wangdue Phodrang | Nahi ན་ཧི་ |
| Wangdue Phodrang | Nyisho ཉི་ཤོག་ |
| Wangdue Phodrang | Phangyul ཕངས་ཡུལ་ |
| Wangdue Phodrang | Phobji ཕོབ་སྦྱིས་ |
| Wangdue Phodrang | Ruepisa རུས་སྦིས་ས་ |
| Wangdue Phodrang | Sephu སྲས་ཕུག་ |
| Wangdue Phodrang | Thedtsho ཐེད་ཚོ་ |
| Zhemgang | Bardo བར་རྡོ་ |
| Zhemgang | Bjoka འབྱོག་ཀ། |
| Zhemgang | Goshing སྒོ་ཤིང་། |
| Zhemgang | Nangkor ནང་སྐོར། |
| Zhemgang | Ngangla ངང་ལ། |
| Zhemgang | Phangkhar ཕང་མཁར། |
| Zhemgang | Shingkhar ཤིང་མཁར། |
| Zhemgang | Trong ཀྲོང་། |

== See also ==
- Dzongkhag
  - Dungkhag
- Chiwog
- Local Government Act of Bhutan 2009
- List of terms for country subdivisions
