= Dungkhag =

Sub-district of a dzongkhag (district) of Bhutan

A dungkhag (Dzongkha: དྲུང་ཁག་ drungkhak) is a sub-district of a dzongkhag (district) of Bhutan. The head of a dungkhag is a Dungpa. As of 2007, nine of the twenty dzongkhags had from one to three dungkhags, with sixteen dungkhags in total.

== History ==
Under Bhutan's first government Act of decentralization, the Dzongkhag Yargay Tshogdu Chathrim of 2002 Dungpas were given a non-voting seat on the Dzongkhag Yargay Tshogdu. Under the Local Government Act of 2007, dungkhags provided general administration and coordination for two or more gewogs. As a result, some gewogs within a given district were directly subordinate to dungkhags while others are directly subordinate to dzongkhags. Dungkhag Administrations guided and supported their constituent Gewog Administrations and implemented the decisions of the Dzongkhag Tshogdu. Dungpas were administrative executives that reported directly to the Dzongkhag administration. The Dungpa was empowered to attend the meetings of the Gewog Tshogdes as a non-voting member.

In addition to administrative functions, Dungkhag Courts were codified under the Judicial Act of 2007 and Constitution of 2008 as a court of first instance within the judicial system of Bhutan. These courts are subordinate to Dzongkhag Courts.

Under the Local Government Act of 2009, the administrative status of dungkhags is eschewed, and Dungpas are not specified to attend meetings of the Dzongkhag Tshogdu. The repeal of the Local Government Act of 2007 means that although dungkhags are no longer legal administrative divisions, they remain judicial and law enforcement jurisdictions under the Constitution.

== List of dungkhags ==
The internal territorial divisions of Bhutan, including dungkhags and their constituent gewogs, are subject to alteration by the Government of Bhutan through creation, transfer, and merger. For example, in 2002, there were 199 gewogs in the 20 dzongkhags; by 2005, there were 205. In 2007, Lhamoizingkha Dungkhag was formally transferred from Sarpang Dzongkhag to Dagana Dzongkhag, affecting the town of Lhamoizingkha and three constituent gewogs – Lhamoizingkha, Deorali and Nichula (Zinchula) – that formed the westernmost part of Sarpang and became the southernmost part of Dagana. Such changes are reflected in the list below.

As of 2007, there were 16 dungkhags among nine of twenty Bhutanese dzongkhags.

Dzongkhag	Dungkhag	Gewog
Chukha	1. Phuentsholing	Dala
Chukha	1. Phuentsholing	Logchina
Chukha	1. Phuentsholing	Phuentsholing
Chukha	1. Phuentsholing	Sampheling
Dagana	2. Dagapela	Dorona
Dagana	2. Dagapela	Goshi
Dagana	2. Dagapela	Trashiding
Dagana	3. Lhamoi Zingkha	Lhamoi Zingkha
Dagana	3. Lhamoi Zingkha	Deorali
Dagana	3. Lhamoi Zingkha	Nichula
Pema Gatshel	4. Nganglam	Dechenling
Pema Gatshel	4. Nganglam	Choekhorling
Pema Gatshel	4. Nganglam	Norbugang
Samdrup Jongkhar	5. Bhangtar	Dalim
Samdrup Jongkhar	5. Bhangtar	Martshala
Samdrup Jongkhar	5. Bhangtar	Samrang
Samdrup Jongkhar	6. Jomotsangkha	Lauri
Samdrup Jongkhar	6. Jomotsangkha	Serthi
Samdrup Jongkhar	7. Samdrup Choling	Pemathang
Samdrup Jongkhar	7. Samdrup Choling	Phuntshothang
Samtse	8. Chengmari	Chengmari
Samtse	8. Chengmari	Chargharey
Samtse	9. Dorokha	Denchukha
Samtse	9. Dorokha	Dorohka
Samtse	9. Dorokha	Dungtoe
Samtse	10. Tashi Choling	Bara
Samtse	10. Tashi Choling	Tendu
Samtse	10. Tashi Choling	Biru
Samtse	10. Tashi Choling	Lehereni
Samtse	10. Tashi Choling	Sipsu
Sarpang	11. Gelephu	Bhur
Sarpang	11. Gelephu	Gelephu
Sarpang	11. Gelephu	Sherzhong
Sarpang	11. Gelephu	Taklai
Thimphu	12. Lingzhi	Lingzhi
Thimphu	12. Lingzhi	Naro
Thimphu	12. Lingzhi	Soe
Trashigang	13. Sakteng	Merak
Trashigang	13. Sakteng	Sakten
Trashigang	14. Thrimshing	Kangpara
Trashigang	14. Thrimshing	Thrimshing
Trashigang	15. Wamrong	Khaling
Trashigang	15. Wamrong	Lumang
Zhemgang	16. Panbang	Bjoka
Zhemgang	16. Panbang	Goshing
Zhemgang	16. Panbang	Ngangla
Zhemgang	16. Panbang	Phangkhar

== See also ==
- Dzongkhag (list)
- Gewog
  - Chiwog
    - Villages of Bhutan
- Dungkhag Court
- Local Government Act of Bhutan 2009
