= Serthi Gewog =

Serthi Gewog གསེར་ཐིག་
- Gewog
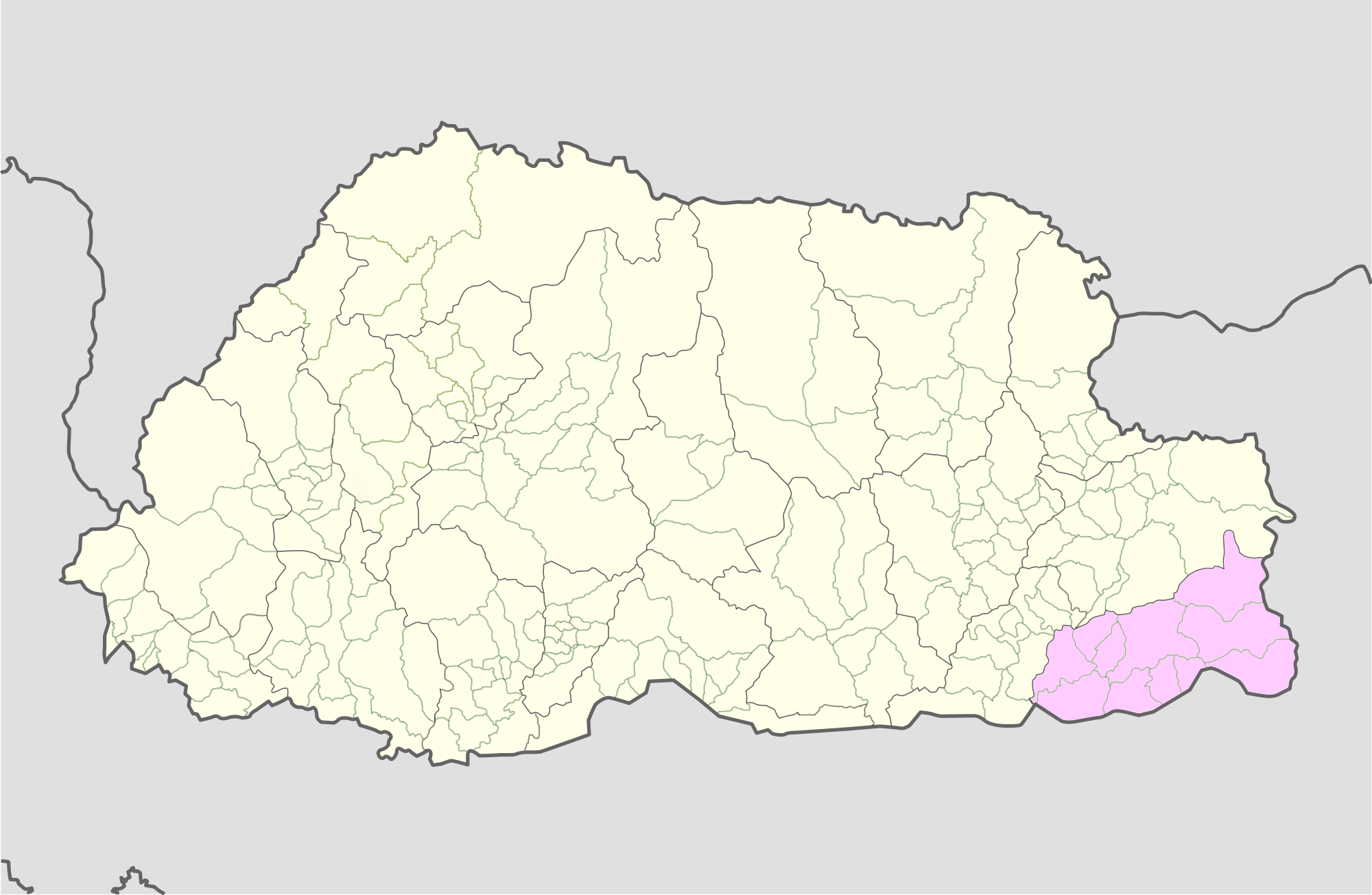
- Interactive map of Serthi Gewog
- Coordinates: 27.0062°N 91.9538°E
- Country: Bhutan
- District: Samdrup Jongkhar District
- Time zone: UTC+6 (BTT)

Serthi Gewog (Dzongkha: གསེར་ཐིག་) is a gewog (village block) of Samdrup Jongkhar District, Bhutan.
