= Sampheling Gewog =

Sampheling Gewog བསམ་འཕེལ་གླིང་
- Gewogs
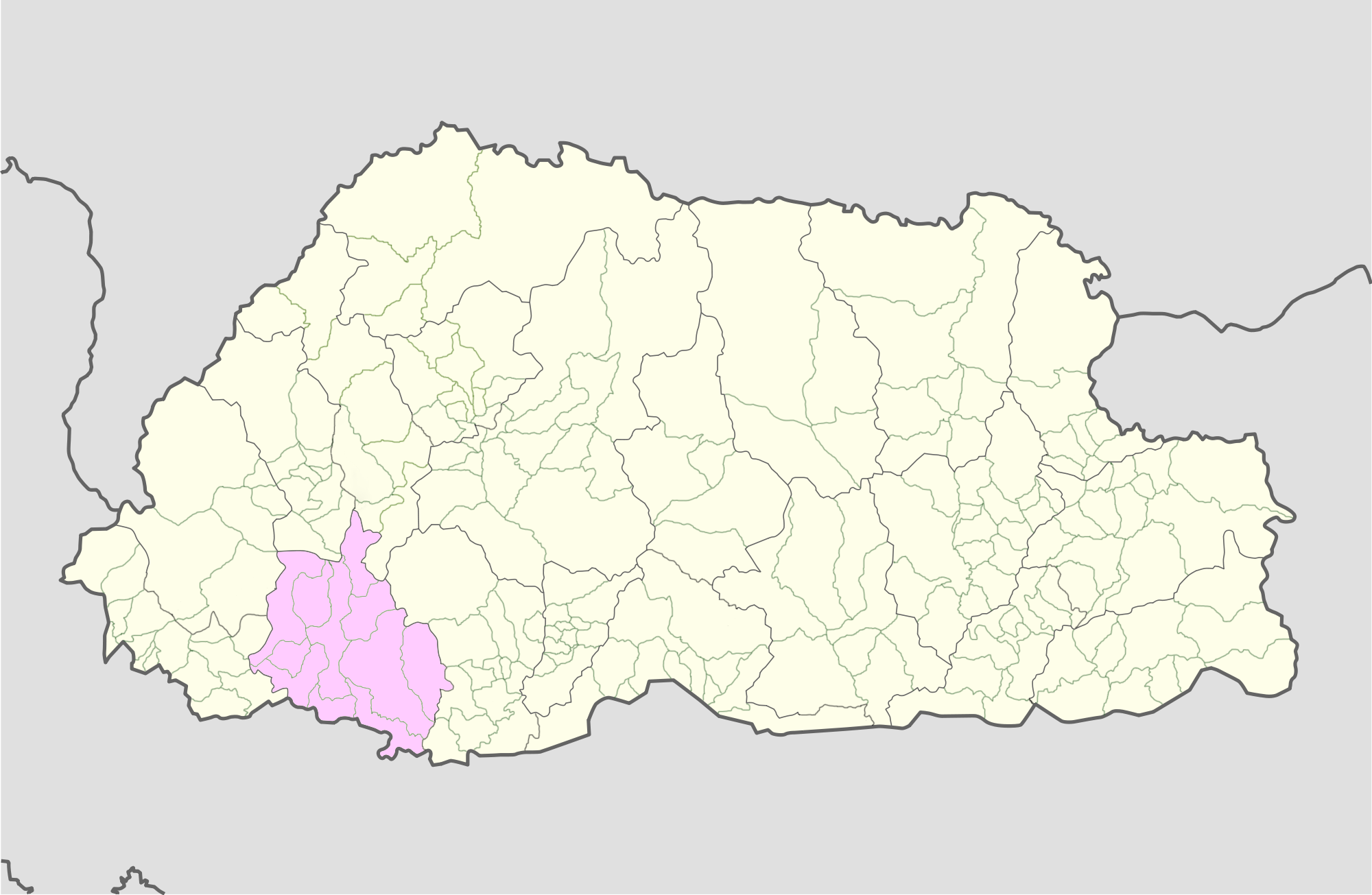
- Location within Chukha District
- Coordinates: 26°50′20″N 89°29′30″E
- Country: Bhutan
- District: Chukha District

Area
  - Total: 54 sq mi (140 km^{2})
- Time zone: UTC+6 (BTT)

Sampheling Gewog (Dzongkha: བསམ་འཕེལ་གླིང་, Samphelling Gewog) is a gewog (village block) of Chukha District, Bhutan. The Gewog covers 140 km².
