= List of cities in Bhutan =

Cities and towns in the country of Bhutan

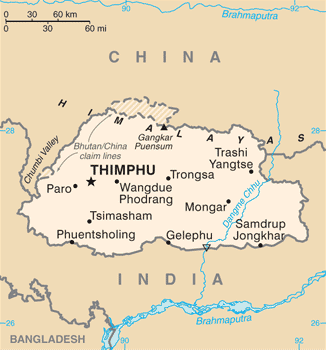
Map of Bhutan

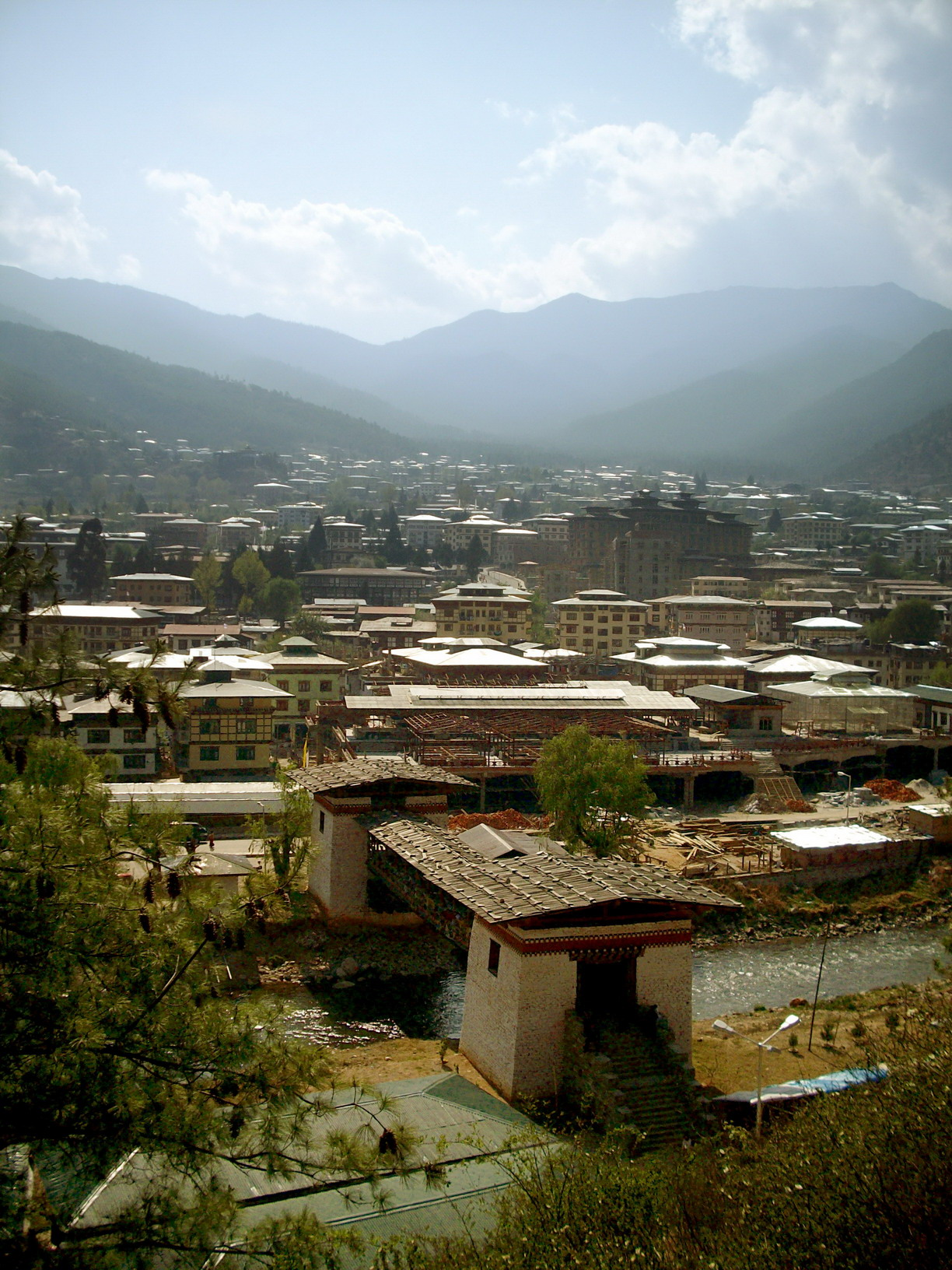
Thimphu

This is a list of cities and towns in Bhutan.

== List ==
- Chhukha
- Daga
- Damphu
- Gasa
- Gelephu
- Ha
- Jakar
- Lhuntshi
- Mongar
- Paro
- Pemagatsel
- Phuntsholing
- Punakha
- Samtse
- Samdrup Jongkhar
- Thimphu
- Trashigang
- Tongsa
- Wangdue Phodrang
- Zhemgang

== 10 largest cities ==
City	Population (2017)	District
Thimphu	114,551	Thimphu
Phuntsholing	27,658	Chukha
Paro	11,448	Paro
Gelephu	9,858	Sarpang
Samdrup Jongkhar	9,325	Samdrup Jongkhar
Wangdue Phodrang	8,954	Wangdue Phodrang
Punakha	6,262	Punakha
Jakar	6,243	Bumthang
Nganglam	5,418	Pemagetshel
Samtse	5,396	Samtse
