= Pemagatshel Dzong =

Administrative centre

- Location within Bhutan

Religion
- Affiliation: Tibetan Buddhism

Location
- Location: Pemagatshel District
- Country: Bhutan
- Interactive map of Pemagatshel Dzong
- Coordinates: 27°04′03″N 91°29′10″E

Architecture
- Style: Dzong architecture

Pemagatshel Dzong (Dzongkha: པདྨ་དགའ་ཚལ་་རྫོང་; Wylie: Pema-gatshel rdzong), also known as Druk Migyur Dechen Dzong, is the new administrative centre of Pemagatshel District in eastern Bhutan. It is located in Denchi under Shumar Gewog. The new Dzong was named Druk Migyur Dechen Dzong (Fortress of Unwavering Bliss) by His Holiness the Je Khenpo, Trulku Jigme Chhoeda. Druk Miyur Dechen Dzong was constructed by the Heritage Sites and Archaeology Division under the Department of Culture and Dzongkha Development, Ministry of Home Affairs in close coordination with Pemagatshel Dzongkhag.

== Location ==
The new Dzong is located at Denchi town which is 19 km away from the old Pemagatshel town on 6.5 acres of land. The site was acquired from the public for the Dzong construction. The Dzong site is strategically located within the overall town plan.

== Background ==
The Pemagatshel Dzong construction project was initiated in the 10th FYP, and the project has spanned over three plan periods: 10th, 11th and 12th FYP’s. However, the implementation of the project on-site was only started in July 2012, towards the end of the 10th FYP, with a budget of Nu 610 M from the Government of India.

Construction was targeted to be completed in 2018. However, changes made to the drawing of the central tower delayed it. The deadline was pushed to June 2020 but it was further delayed due to the COVID-19 pandemic.

The new Pema Gatshel Dzong was completed only in 2023 taking over 11 years. It was consecrated by His Eminence Tsugla Lopen Karma Rangdrol on 22 September 2023. The consecration ceremony was attended by His Royal Highness Gyaltshab, Jigme Dorji Wangchuck, and the Prime Minister, Dasho Dr Lotay Tshering.

Pemagatshel Dzongkhag Administration shifted their offices to the new Druk Migyur Dechen Dzong on 16 March 2023.

== Architecture ==
With its seamless fusion of contemporary building technology, contemporary materials, and fundamental Bhutanese architectural features, Pema Gatshel Dzong epitomises the 21st century. This includes the use of modern materials like steel and concrete, the incorporation of sustainable design concepts that suit the location and climate, and the installation of essential safety features. In addition to these contemporary elements, the Dzong also had traditional elements like tapering walls, multi-tier floating roofs, and a courtyard system. Two ramps on either side of Pema Gatshel Dzong's main entrance are specifically made to meet the needs of those with disabilities.

=== Entrance ===
The entrance to the Dzong is a two-storied RCC framed building enclosed by the CRM walls. It features both a standard footpath and a ramp to accommodate people with disabilities.

=== Central Tower (Utse) ===
The 5-storied Utse is the tallest building in the Dzong complex. The central tower houses different Lhakhangs on each floor and is used for religious functions. It was built in 2016 and completed by December 2020.

=== Administrative Block ===
The four-storied building toward the south direction is an administrative block and it houses the office of the Dzongdag, head of Dzongkhag. The other two largest buildings on the north and south sides of the gallery grounds are the space for various offices.

=== Monastic Block ===
The Rabdhey or monastic centre is also a four-storied building toward the north direction and it houses the residents of Venerable Lam Neten and offices for the Rabdhey.

=== Gallery & Dochey ===
Gallery and Dochey is located in the middle of the Dzong complex fully enclosed by the Dzong structure. The courtyard is paved with flat stones.

== Festival ==
The three-day Annual Pema Gatshel Tshechu was instituted in 1984. During the festival, various mask dances and folk dances were performed. The Tshechu concludes with the unfurling of the Neten Chu Druk Thongdrel. Pema Gatshel Tshechu was conducted for the first time in the courtyard of the new Pemagatshel Dzong in October 2023.
