= Sergithang Gewog =

Sergithang Gewog གསེར་གྱི་ཐང་
- Gewog
- Location in Bhutan
- Coordinates: 27°06′42″N 90°07′30″E
- Country: Bhutan
- District: Tsirang District

Area
  - Total: 137.6 km^{2} (53.1 sq mi)

Population (2017)
  - Total: 1,379
  - Density: 10.02/km^{2} (26.0/sq mi)
- Time zone: UTC+6 (BTT)

Sergithang Gewog (Dzongkha: གསེར་གྱི་ཐང་) (old name: Patalay) is one of the twelve gewogs (village blocks or counties) of Tsirang District, Bhutan. Sergithang Gewog is located in the northwest of Tsirang District, east of the River Puna Tsang Chu, north of its tributary Burichu, west of Pungtencchu Gewog and south of Wangdue Phodrang District.

== Demographics ==
According to the official results of the 2017 census, 1.379 inhabitants (731 males and 648 females) live in the Serithang Gewog in 300 households. The average household size is 4.3. 1.321 (678 males and 643 females) of these 1.379 inhabitants are of Bhutanese nationality. 53 out of the 58 counted non-Bhutanese inhabitants are male.

== Transportation ==
The central chiwogs Tashitang, Lower Sergithang and Upper Sergithang are connected by a 12.3 km dirt road from a bridge over the Buri Chu River in Tashitang up to Upper Sergithang. This bridge is the only connection between the Serithang Gewog and the other Gewogs of Tsirang District including the administration seat (Dzong) and market town Damphu. Transportation is still a big problem even for these three central chiwogs, because the distance from Sergithang to Damphu is 48 km, 37 km of it on dirt, winding roads which remain closed for almost a quarter of a year annually. According to a report of the Bhutan Chamber of Commerce and Industry of 2014 there is an "immediate plan" to build a 10 km long road to which would connect the Gewog directly to the Tsirang-Wangdue National Highway at the Buri Chu confluence. Semdenjong Chiwog in the east and Norboogang Chiwog in the west are only connected by footpaths. Inhabitants need three and six hours, respectively to reach the road in Sergithang and Tashithang.

== Administrative divisions ==
Serithang Gewog is divided into five Chiwogs or Chios.

- Norboogang Chiwog
- Sergithang Maed Chiwog
- Sergithang Toed Chiwog
- Tashithang Chiwog
- Semdenjong CemdeChiwog
