= Zobel Gewog =

Zobel Gewog བཟོ་སྦལ་
- Gewog
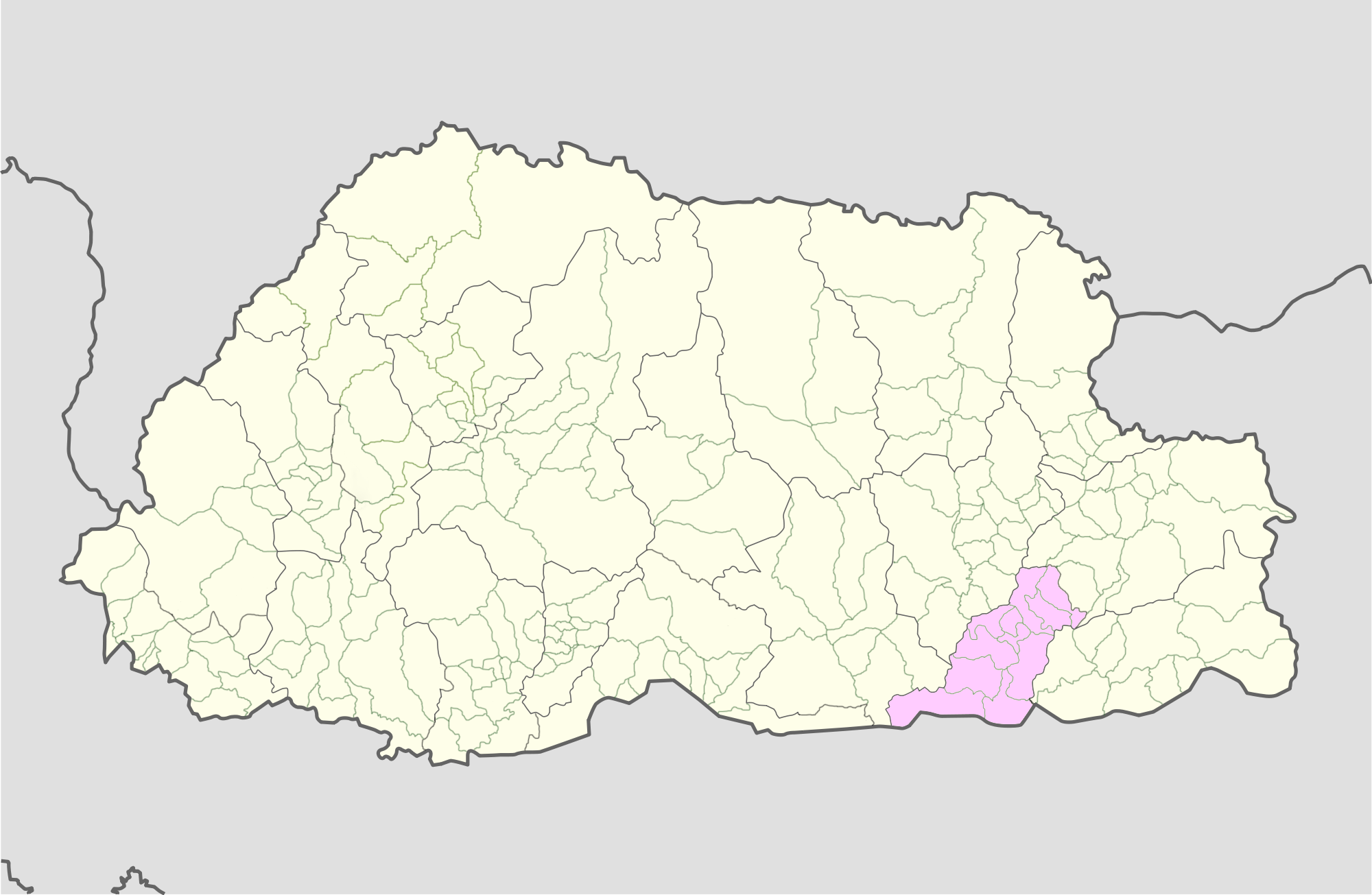
- Country: Bhutan
- District: Pemagatshel District
- Time zone: UTC+6 (BTT)

Zobel Gewog (Dzongkha: བཟོ་སྦལ་) is a gewog (village block) of Pemagatshel District, Bhutan.

The Gewog is known for Yongla Gonpa. The monastery was constructed on top of a mountaintop that resembles Phurba by Kheydrup Jigme Kundel in the 18th century.
