= Chirang =

Chirang may refer to:

- Chirang district, a district in Assam, India
- an alternative spelling of Tsirang, a town in Bhutan
