= Damphu Central School =

Location
- Damphu; Bhutan
- Coordinates: 27°01′25.3″N 90°07′16.3″E

Information
- Former name: Damphu Higher Secondary School
- Type: Government School
- Motto: “Be The Best; Make A Difference.”
- Established: 1948
- School district: Tsirang
- Classes: 9 — 12
- Language: Dzongkha; English
- Website: https://www.damphuhss.edu.bt

Damphu Central School is higher secondary school located in Tsirang, Bhutan. It is located near Damphu Town, the administrative centre of Tsirang district.

== Background ==
Damphu Central School was founded around 1951. It became the first school to introduce the biometrics system in the country, using the fingerprints of the employees to record their time and attendance. On 2 June 2018, King Jigme Khesar Namgyel Wangchuck visited the school and celebrated the social forestry day with the school by planting trees.

== Recognition ==
The school was named a top school in agriculture programs in 2017, which was their third consecutive wins. The school hosted Quizmania Season 7 in 2019, anchored by the Nepalese Actor Rajesh Hamal, in which one of the teams of the school(contested by Mendrelgang CS, Drukjeygang CS, Damphu CS, and Lungtenzampa MSS) got selected to participate in Kathmandu.

The school ranked top 9 in the BCSE exam in the year 2018 in class twelve category.

== Controversies ==
In 2018, Tsirang Dzongkhag Court ordered the principal of Damphu Central School, Dawa to pay nine months salary to the school’s cook, Harka Bahadur Subba, who went missing in Bangkok in the year 2017. The court also ordered that the cook should be reinstated but the principal denied the allegation.
