= Barshong Toed =

Chiwog of Barshong Gewog, Bhutan

- Chiwog
- Country: Bhutan
- District: Tsirang
- Gewog: Barshong Gewog

Population (2008)
  - Total: 256
- Time zone: UTC+6:00 Bhutan Time

Barshong Toed is one of the five chiwogs (a sub-county administrative unit) of Barshong Gewog under Tsirang District, Bhutan. It had 256 population as of 2008 and only one registered jurisdiction.
