= Tshatshe =

Village in Nanong Gewog, Bhutan

Coordinates: 27°8′47″N 91°26′36″E

Tshatshe is a village in Nanong Gewog, Bhutan. It is located in the extreme northern part of Pema Gatshel Dzongkhag.

In the past, Tshatshe was the capital of the Tshetshe Khochi (equivalent to a duchy in the west). The nine storied castle of Tshatshe Khochi was destroyed by a Tibetan invasion in the early days during the reign of the Druk Desis and the palace was rebuilt in Tshatshe Khomotshe and the original ruins are still apparent today. The clan 'Tshatshi Khochi' were the descendants of Prince Tshangma( Lhasey Tshangma, grandson of King Trisong Detsen).

One of the primary trade routes between ancient India and Tibet passed through the village. To this day such paths can be seen, some as big as Bhutan's automobile roads.
