= Nganglam Gewog =

- Gewog
- Country: Bhutan
- District: Pemagatshel District
- Sub-district: Nganglam Dungkhag
- Time zone: UTC+6 (BTT)

Nganglam Gewog is a former gewog (village block) of Pemagatshel District, Bhutan. Nganglam Gewog is part of Nganglam Dungkhag, along with Dechenling and Norbugang Gewogs.
