= Squatting in Bhutan =

Bhutan on globe

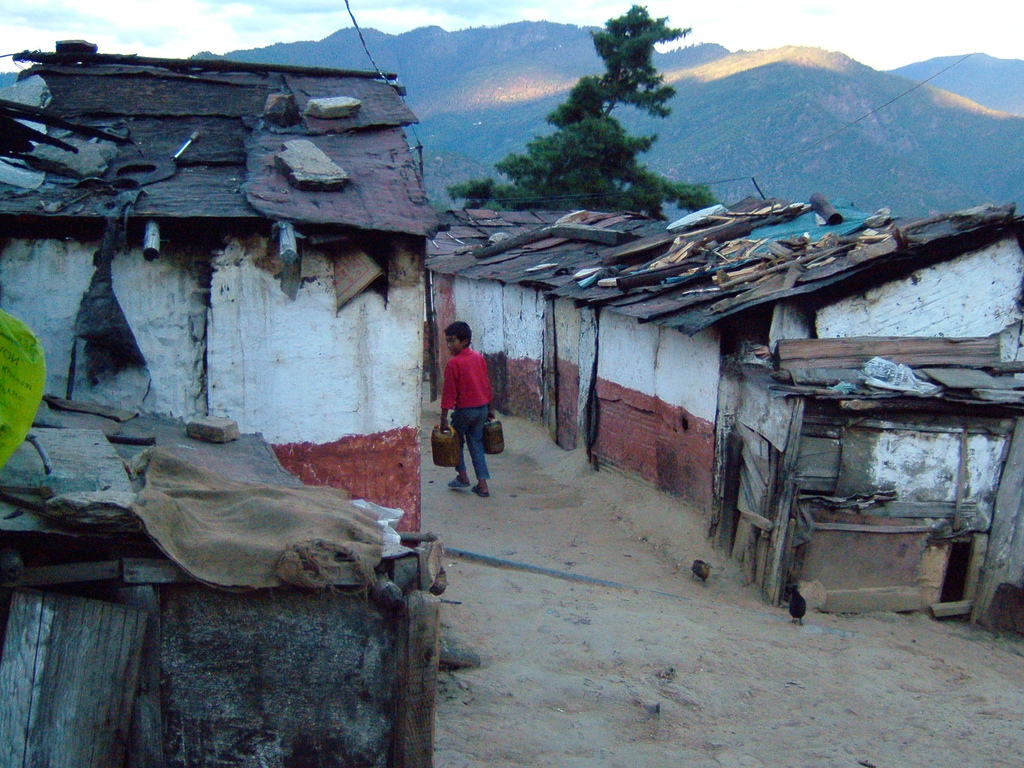
A Nepali slum in Paro

In 2001, about 10 per cent of the population of Bhutan's capital city Thimphu were living in squatted informal settlements; by 2019, the figure had dropped to 2 per cent since the squatters had been rehoused. There are also rudimentary settlements on the periphery of other cities such as Phuntsholing and Samdrup Jongkhar. The inhabitants work as manual labourers or in the informal economy.

There are forest squatters in the south of Bhutan on the border with India: in 2016, evictions led to riots in Chirang district, in the Bodoland Territorial Region; in Kokrajhar district, entrepreneurs clear forest land and sell the right the live there to people who become de facto squatters. In the 1990s, a process of ethnic cleansing in the south of Bhutan led to around 100,000 Lhotshampa (Bhutanese people of Nepalese descent) being driven into Nepal, where they either squat or live in refugee camps.
