= Rangshi Gayri =

Village in Pemagatshel District, Bhutan

Rangshi Gayri རང་ཤི་གའི་རི
- Village
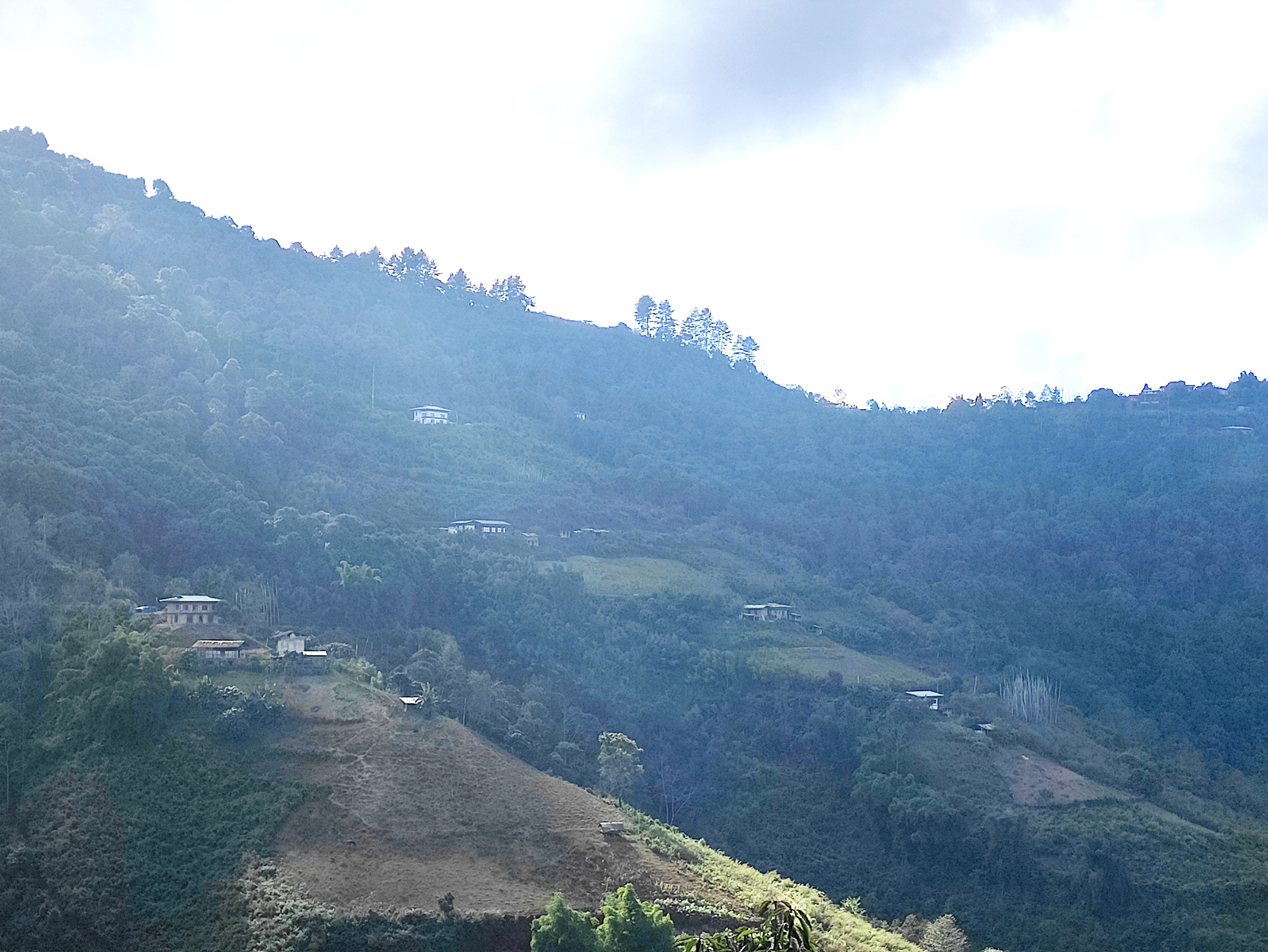
- Rangshi Gayri, Nanong, Pemagatshel, Bhutan

- Location in Bhutan
- Coordinates: 27°06′53″N 91°29′52″E
- Country: Bhutan
- Dzongkhag: Pemagatshel District
- Gewog: Nanong Gewog

Rangshi Gayri (Dzongkha: རང་ཤི་གའི་རི་) is a small village in Tokari Chiwog of Nanong Gewog under Pemagatshel District, Bhutan.

== Description ==
The village consists of five households with a small community Lhakhang.

Rangshi Gayri is under Nanong-Shumar Constituency and the present member of parliament is Hon. Yeshi Jamtsho from Bhutan Tendrel Party (BTP).
