= Damphu =

Damphu may refer to:

- Damphu, Tsirang, a town in Bhutan, capital of Tsirang district
- Damphu drum, a type of Nepalese drum
