= Dechenling Gewog =

Dechenling Gewog བདེ་ཆེན་གླིང་
- Gewog
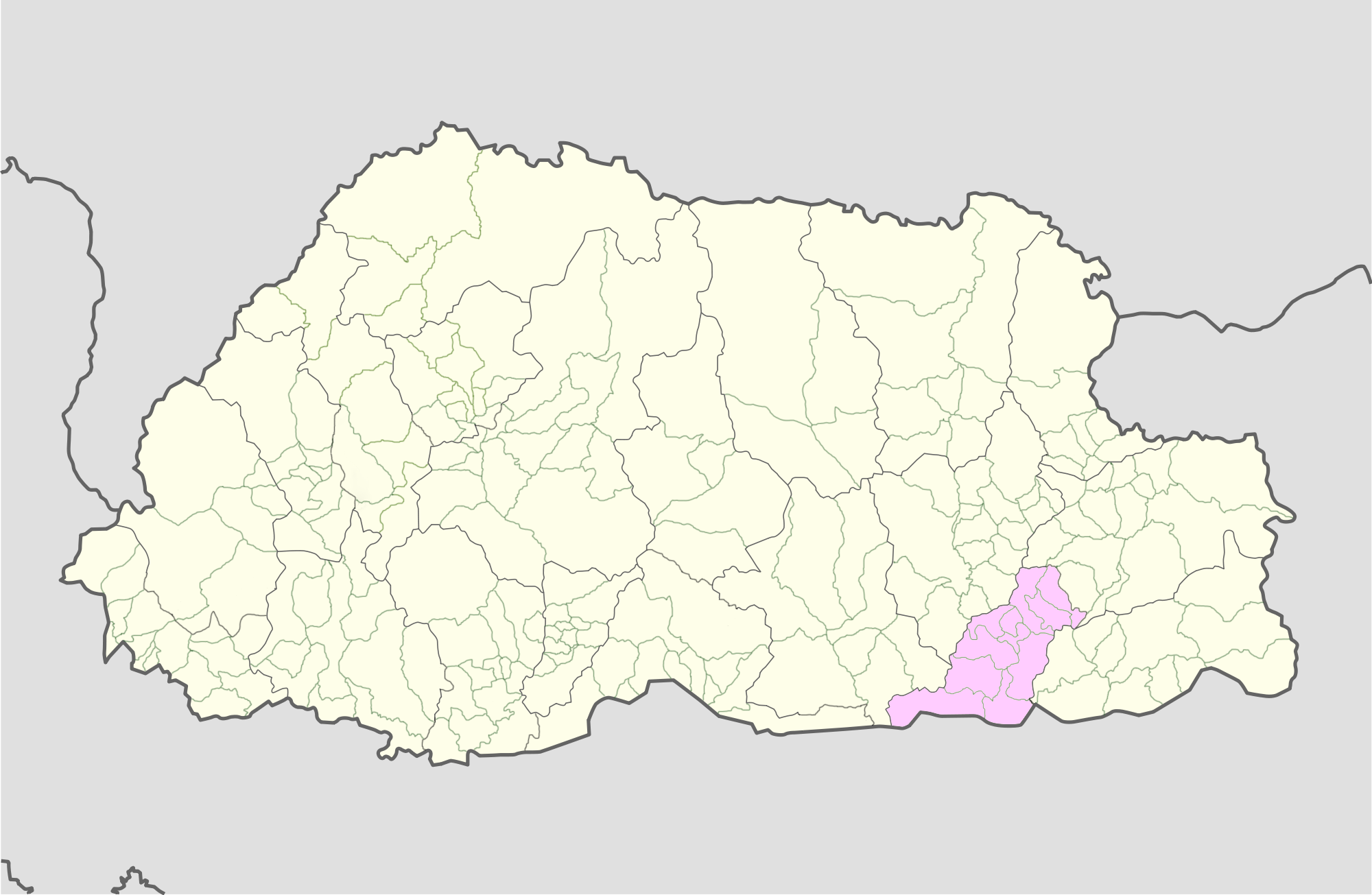
- Country: Bhutan
- District: Pemagatshel District
- Time zone: UTC+6 (BTT)

Dechheling Gewog (Dzongkha: བདེ་ཆེན་གླིང་) is a gewog (village block) of Pemagatshel District, Bhutan. Dechenling Gewog is part of Nganglam Dungkhag, along with Nganglam and Norbugang Gewogs.
