= Dunglegang Gewog =

Dunglagang Gewog དུང་ལ་སྒང་
- Gewog
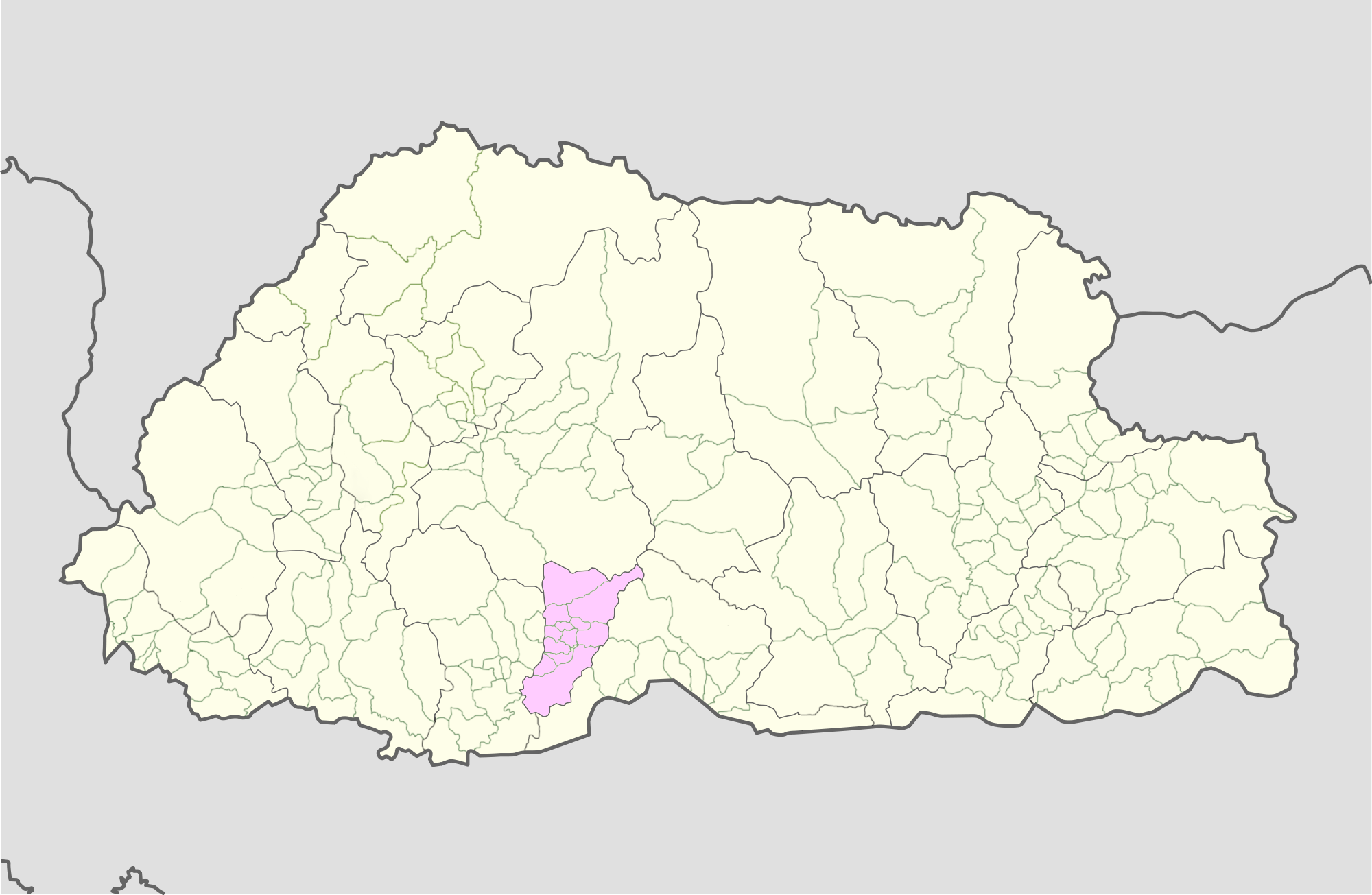
- Country: Bhutan
- District: Tsirang District
- Time zone: UTC+6 (BTT)

Dunglegang Gewog (Dzongkha: གདུང་ལ་གངས་རྒེད་འོག, also spelled Doongalagang) is a gewog (village block) of Tsirang District, Bhutan.
