= Semjong Gewog =

Semjong Gewog སེམས་ལྗོངས་
- Gewog
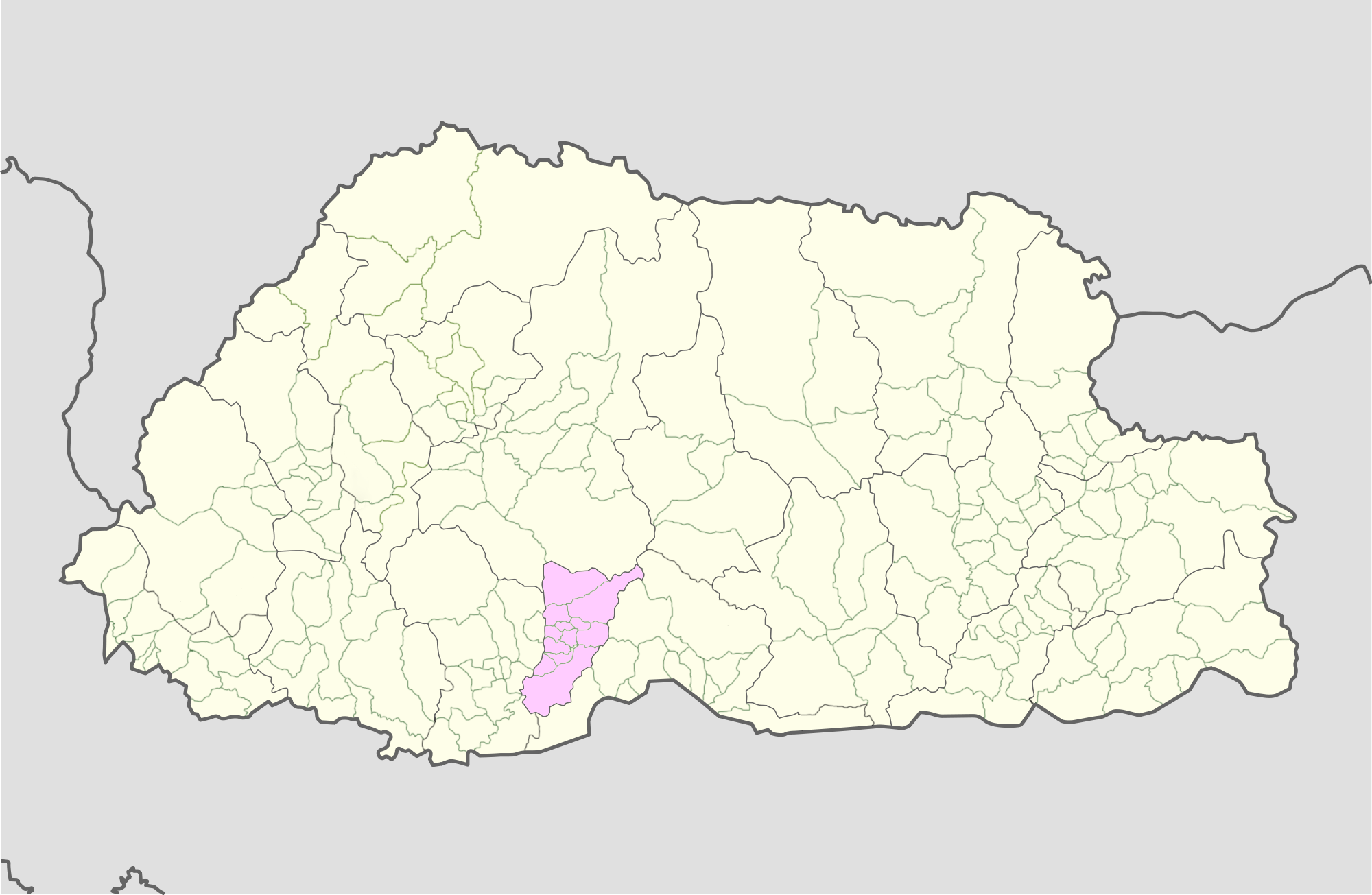
- Country: Bhutan
- District: Tsirang District
- Time zone: UTC+6 (BTT)

Semjong Gewog (Dzongkha: སེམས་ལྗོངས་) is a gewog (village block) of Tsirang District, Bhutan.
