= Yongla Monastery =

Nyingma Buddhist monastery in Pema Gatshel, Bhutan

Religion
- Affiliation: Tibetan Buddhism
- Sect: Nyingma
- Deity: Jigme Lingpa

Location
- Location: Pema Gatshel
- Country: Bhutan

Architecture
- Founder: Kheydrup Jigme Kundel
- Established: 18th century

Yongla Monastery is a Nyingma Buddhist monastery in Pema Gatshel in Bhutan and is located at Yongla on top of a mountain and is seen when one goes through the national highway linking Samdrup Jongkhar and Pema Gatshel.

== Legend ==
Although Yongla Goenpa was founded by Yongla Lam Dorji in 1736 but the monastery was originally founded by Kheydrup Jigme Kundel in the 18th century. Kheydrup Jigme Kundel was instructed by Jigme Lingpa to find a destination that resembled that of Tsari in Tibet which looked like a ritual dagger (Phurpa). This was a move to spread the teaching of Jigme Lingpa. Jigme Kuendel reportedly travelled from Tibet through Bumthang looking for the destined place until he reached the present day Yongla accompanied by Khandro Dechen Gyalmo. When he asked the Khandro if this was the place prophesied by his master, the Khandro said, ‘Yong Yong’, meaning ‘Yes, Yes’, thus the place was named Yongla. Jigme Kuendel then meditated in this place and spread his teachings and then built a meditation center at the place. A nunnery was also built at the same place due to increase in popularity of Kuendel's teaching. The Lhakhang that is seen now was built around the 1980s and a total of 16 successive Lams have served as the abbot of Yongla Gonpa.

== Renovation ==
The Yongla monastery was severely damaged due to 6.1 magnitude that struck the country on 21 September 2009 and was then renovated when King Jigme Khesar Namgyel Wangchuck when he visited the monastery following the earthquake. The reconstruction began in 2012 and it was restored to its former glory in 2019.

== Yongla Phurpai Drubchen ==
The Drupchhen festival was initiated by Kheydrup Jigme Kuendrol in the 18th century. However, the festival was lost until 1960s when it was reinstated by Lam Sonam Zangpo. The annual Phurpai Drubchen is conducted by the Pema Gatshel Rabdey in September and lasts for ten days. On the final day, the devotees receive blessings from the sacred relic of Phurpa.
