= Gosarling Gewog =

Gosarling Gewog སྒོ་གསར་གླིང་
- Gewog
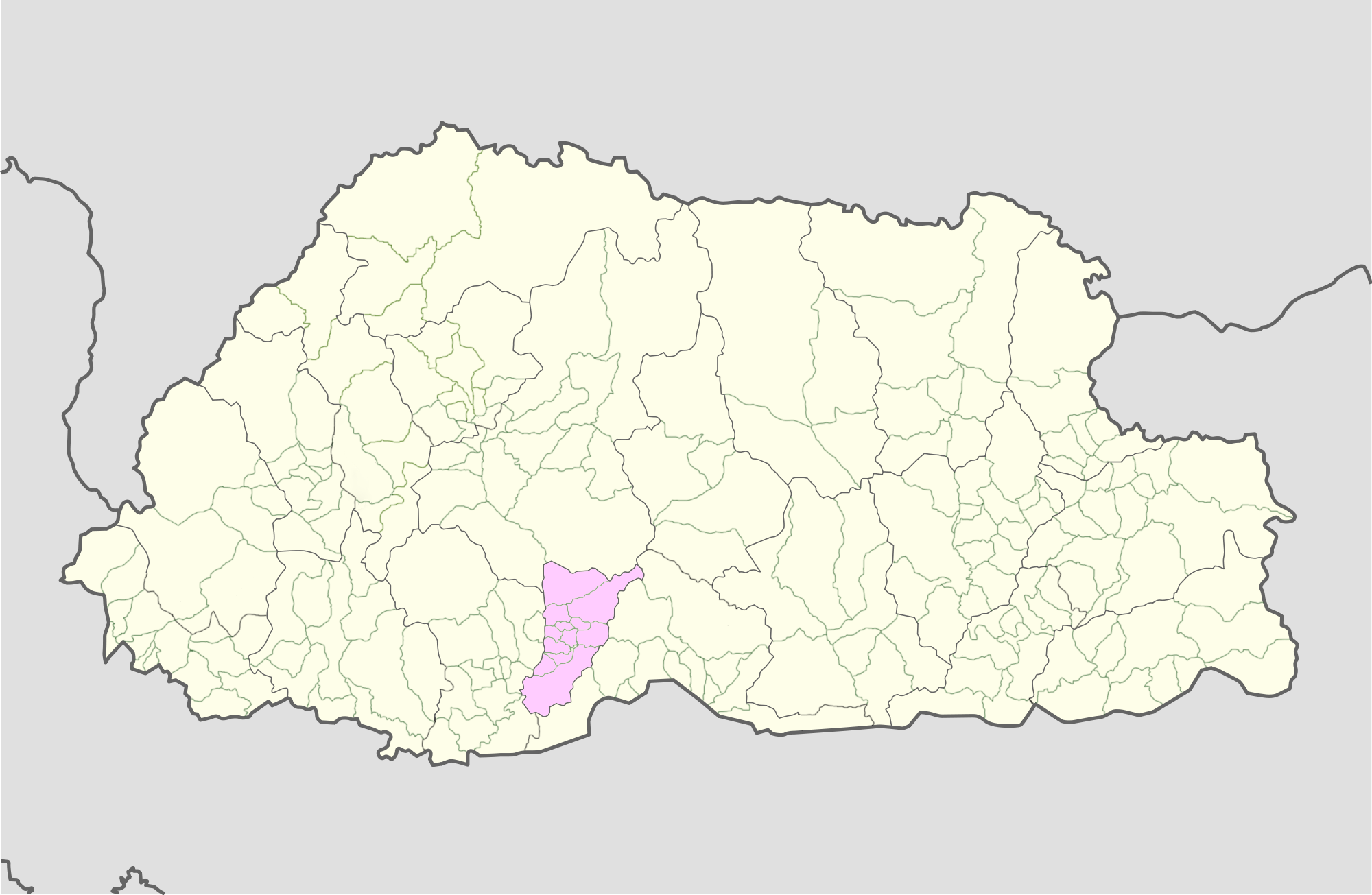
- Country: Bhutan
- District: Tsirang District
- Time zone: UTC+6 (BTT)

Gosarling Gewog (Dzongkha: སྒོ་སར་གླིང་རྒེད་འོག) is a gewog (village block) of Tsirang District, Bhutan. Its old name was Goseling.
