= Khar Gewog =

Khar Gewog མཁར་
- Gewogs
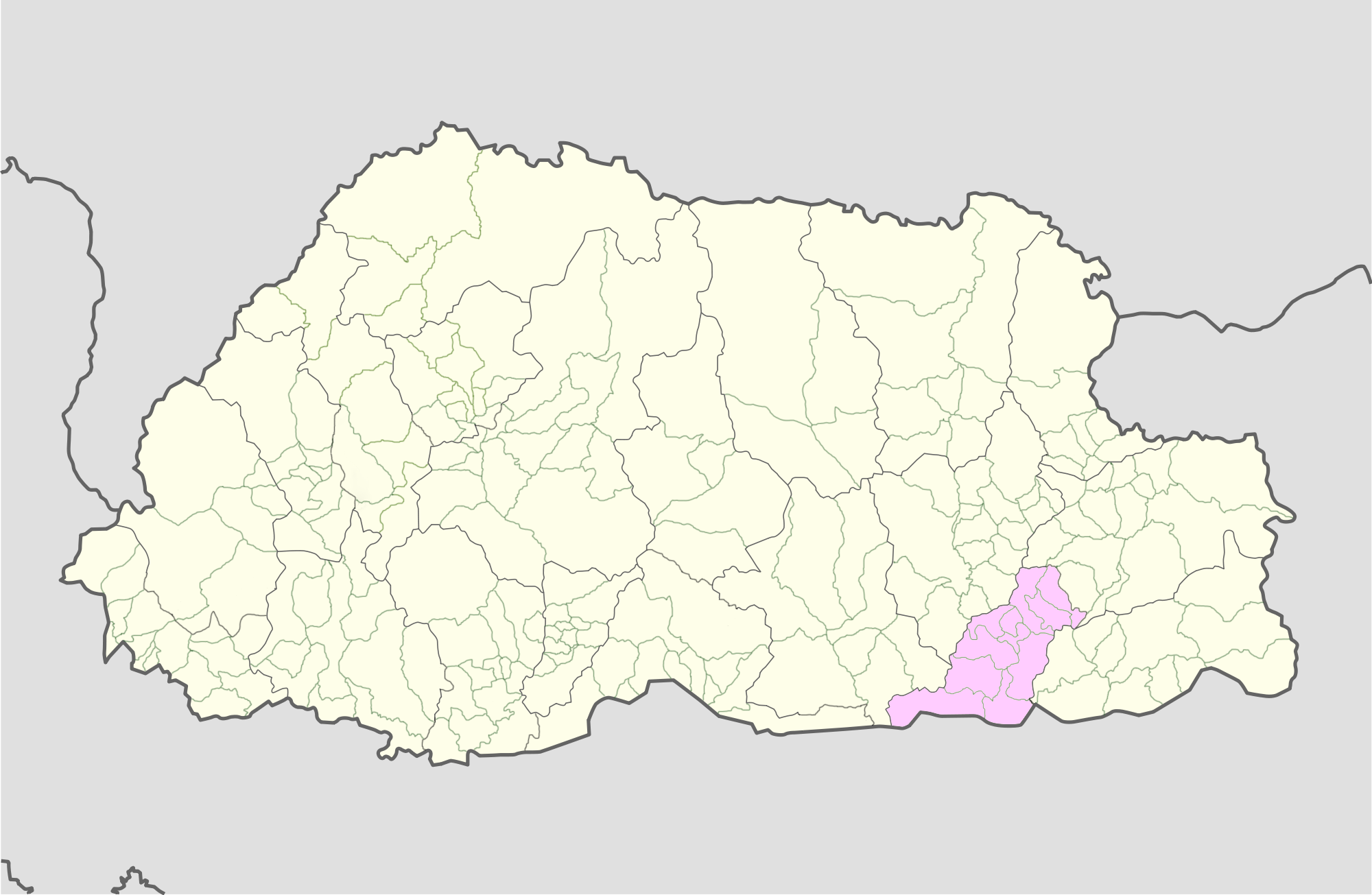
- Country: Bhutan
- District: Pemagatshel District
- Time zone: UTC+6 (BTT)

Khar Gewog (Dzongkha: མཁར་) is a gewog (village block) of Pemagatshel District, Bhutan.
