= Nganglam =

Nganglam Nganglam pas
- Location in Bhutan
- Coordinates: 26°50′15″N 91°15′0″E
- Country: Bhutan
- District: Pema Gatshel District
- Elevation: 145 m (476 ft)

Population (2017)
  - Total: 2,418

Nganglam or Nanglam is a town in south-eastern Bhutan. It is located in Pema Gatshel District.

Population 1,018 (2005 census). The postal code of Nganglam Post Office is 44102.
