= Barshong Gewog =

Barshong Gewog བར་གཤོང་
- Gewog
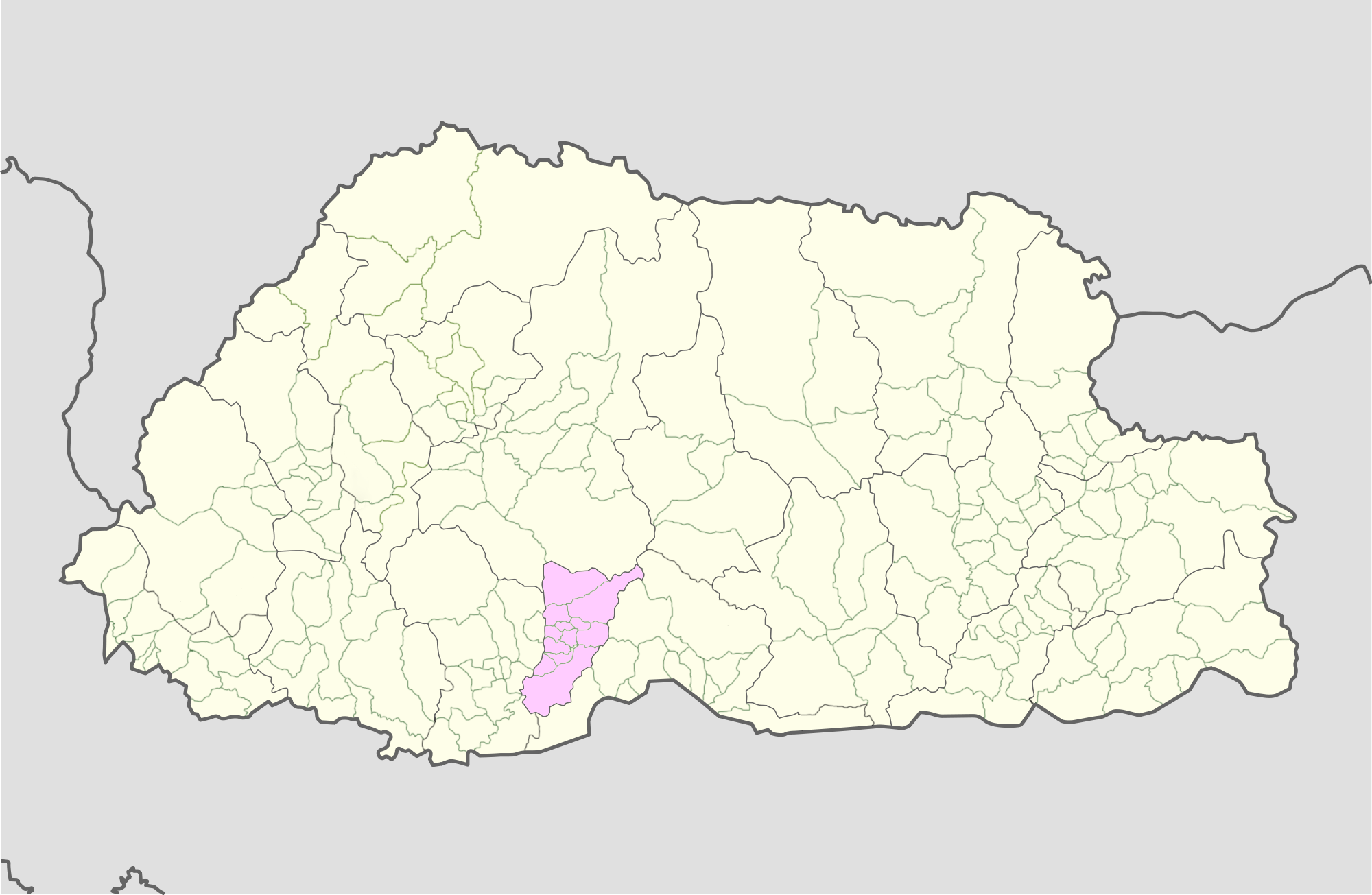
- Country: Bhutan
- District: Tsirang District
- Time zone: UTC+6 (BTT)

Barshong Gewog (Dzongkha: བར་གཤོང་རྒེད་འོག་) is a gewog (a village block or county) of Tsirang District, Bhutan.

Barshong Gewog is located in the western part of Tsirang District and has an area of 21.2 km^{2}. The altitude ranges from 700 to 1500 meters above the sea level. Some 53% of the land area is under forest cover comprising mainly broad-leaf trees. The gewog has around 575 acres of dry land, 255 acres of wet land, 57 acres of orchards and 10 acres of cardamom. The most commonly used local dialects are Lhotshamkha, Tamang, Mongar and Subba.

The gewog is administratively divided into 5 chewogs, namely Barshong Toed, Barshong Maed, Gangtokha, Chunnykhang and Toedsang, with administration center and RNR center located at Barshong Toed. The gewog has 330 households with a total population of 2383 living in widely scattered 9 villages in the gewog. The gewog center is located about 28 km from the Dzongkhag administration in Tsirang.

Agriculture and livestock extension services are provided by a RNR Extension center while health services and facilities are also presently availed from Basic Health Unit (BHU) located at Gangtokha, Barshong. Almost all households living in the gewog are connected with electricity. The establishment of Community Centers has provided access to ICT facilities to the population.
