= Mongling =

- Location in Bhutan
- Coordinates: 27°3′N 91°27′E
- Country: Bhutan
- District: Pemagatshel District

Population (2005)
  - Total: 66

Mongling is a village in south-eastern Bhutan, located in Pemagatshel District. As of 2005, it has a population of 66.
