= Mendrelgang Gewog =

Mendrelgang Gewog མནྜལ་སྒང་
- Gewog
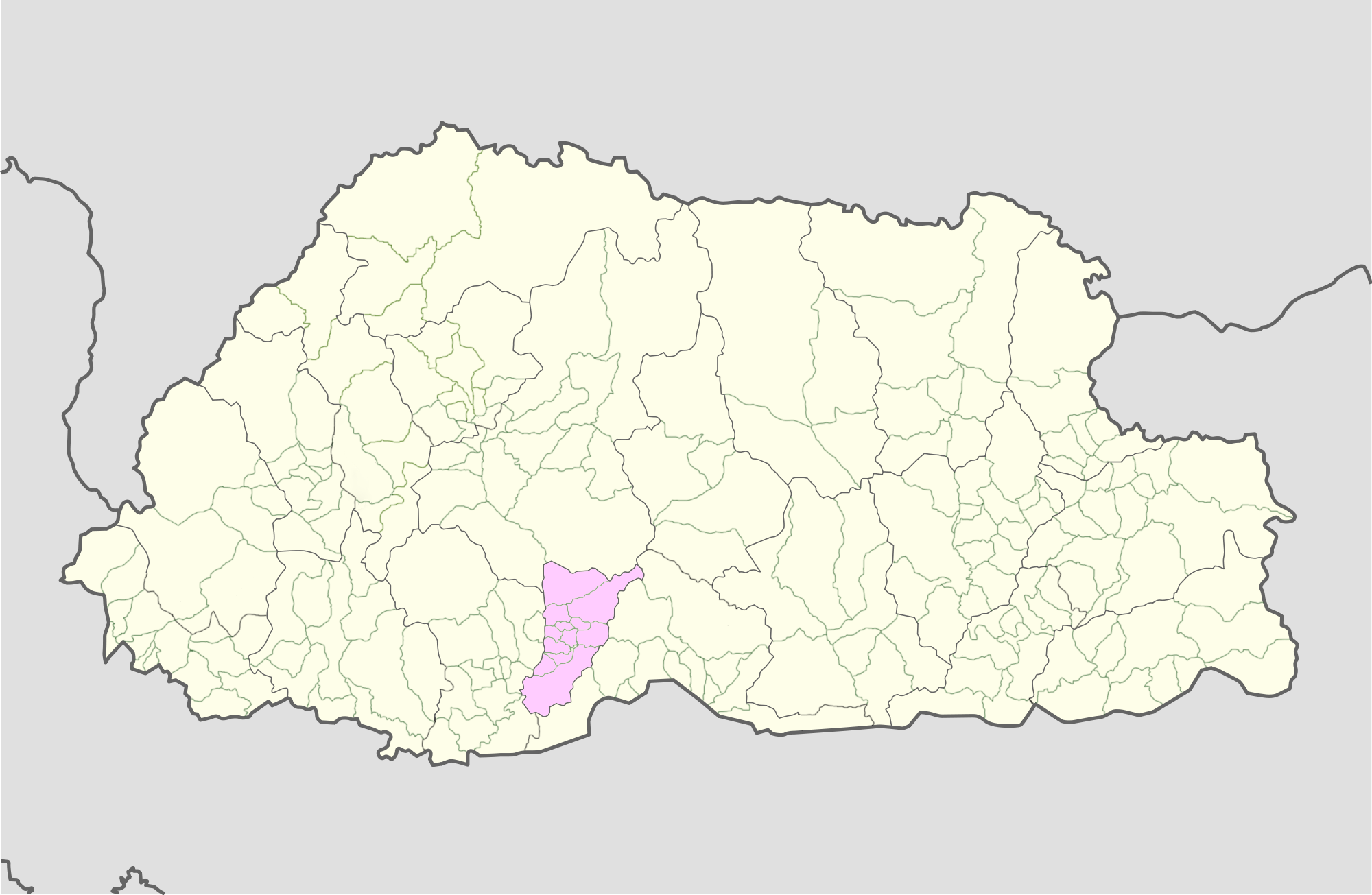
- Country: Bhutan
- District: Tsirang District
- Time zone: UTC+6 (BTT)

Mendrelgang Gewog (Dzongkha: མནྜལ་སྒང་) a gewog (a village block or county ) of Tsirang District, Bhutan.
