= Nangkhor =

- Location in Bhutan
- Coordinates: 27°4′12″N 91°23′24″E
- Country: Bhutan
- District: Pemagatshel District

Population (2005)
  - Total: 672

Nangkhor is a town in south-eastern Bhutan. It is located in Pemagatshel District.

Population 672 (2005 census).
