= Khothakpa =

- Location in Bhutan
- Coordinates: 27°1′48″N 91°23′24″E
- Country: Bhutan
- District: Pemagatshel District

Population (2005)
  - Total: 238

Khothakpa is a village in Pemagatshel District in south-eastern Bhutan.

At the 2005 census, its population was 238.
