= Yurung Gewog =

Yurung Gewog ཡུ་རུང་
- Gewogs
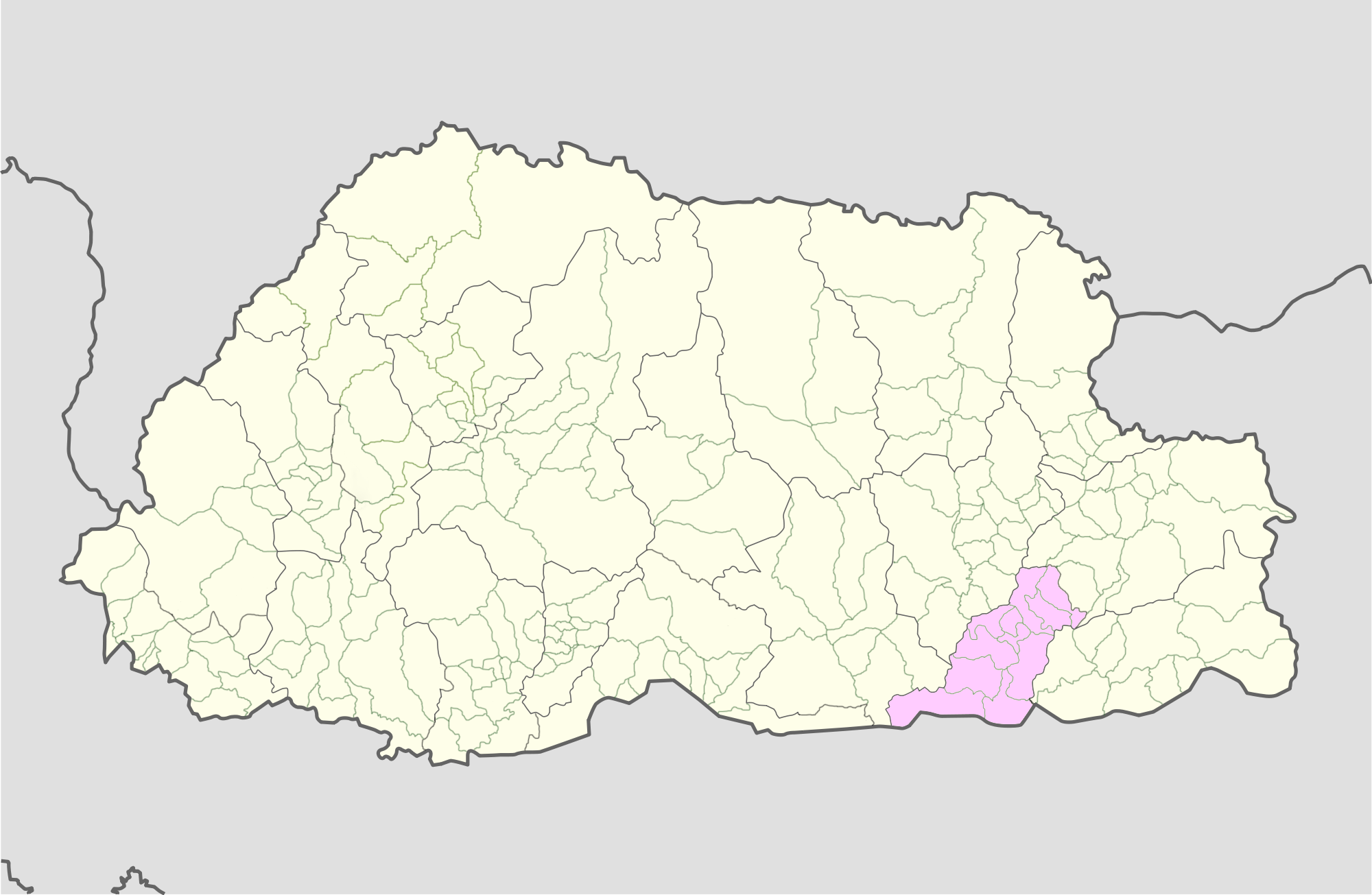
- Coordinates: 27.0437°N 91.34465°E
- Country: Bhutan
- District: Pemagatshel District
- Time zone: UTC+6 (BTT)

Yurung Gewog (Dzongkha: ཡུ་རུང་) is a gewog (village block) of Pemagatshel District, Bhutan.
