= Norbugang Gewog (Pemagatshel) =

Norbugang Gewog ནོར་བུ་སྒང་
- Gewogs
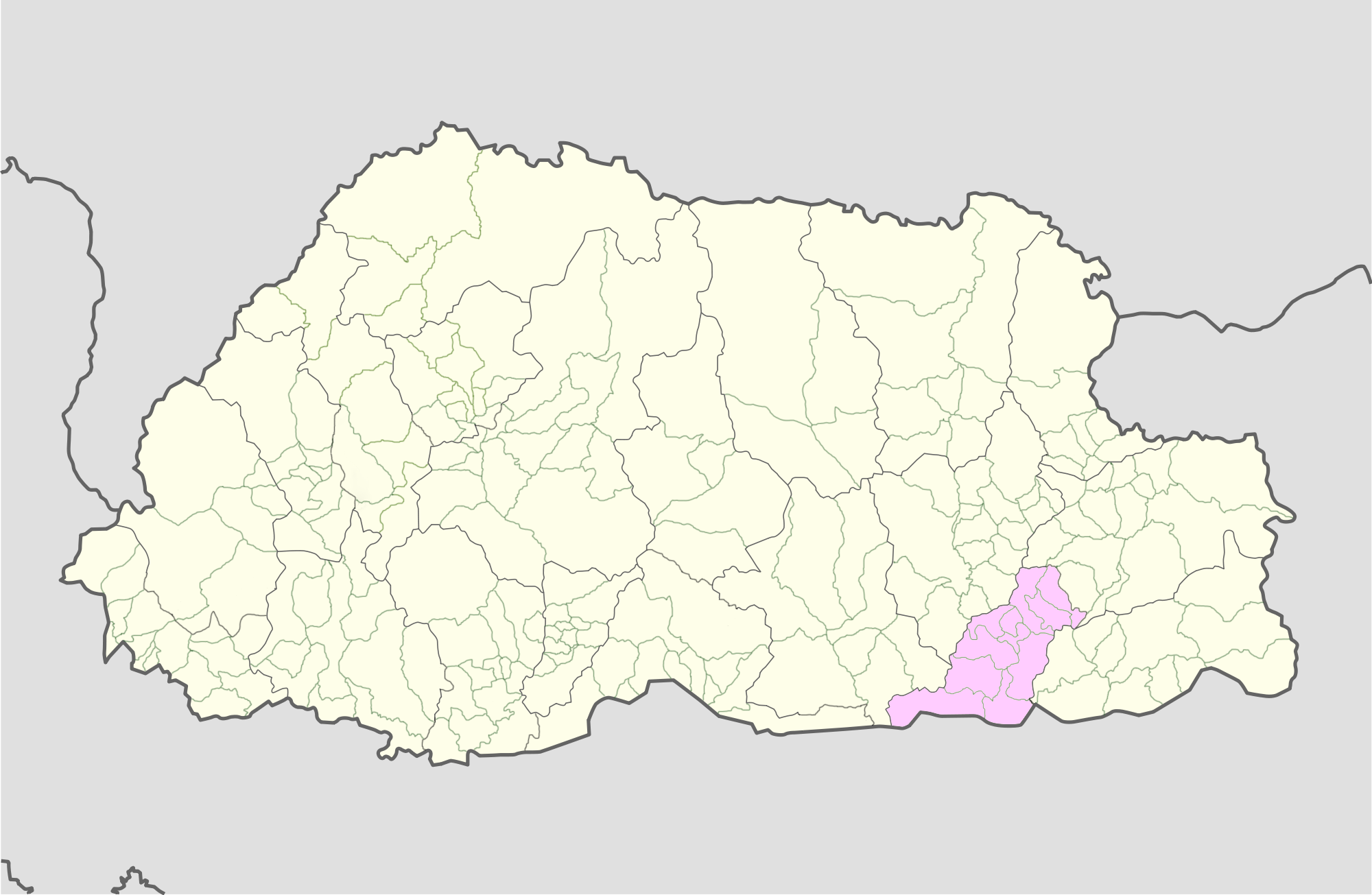
- Country: Bhutan
- District: Pemagatshel District
- Time zone: UTC+6 (BTT)

Norbugang Gewog (Dzongkha: ནོར་བུ་སྒང་) is a gewog (village block) of Pemagatshel District, Bhutan. Norbugang Gewog is part of Nganglam Dungkhag, along with Dechenling and Nganglam Gewogs.
