= Gypsum, Bhutan =

Gypsum
- Location in Bhutan
- Coordinates: 27°1′48″N 91°24′36″E
- Country: Bhutan
- District: Pemagatshel District

Population (2005)
  - Total: 330

Gypsum is a village in south-eastern Bhutan. It is located in Pemagatshel District. At the 2005 census, its population was 330.
