= Nanong Gewog =

Nanong Gewog ན་ནོང་
- Gewogs
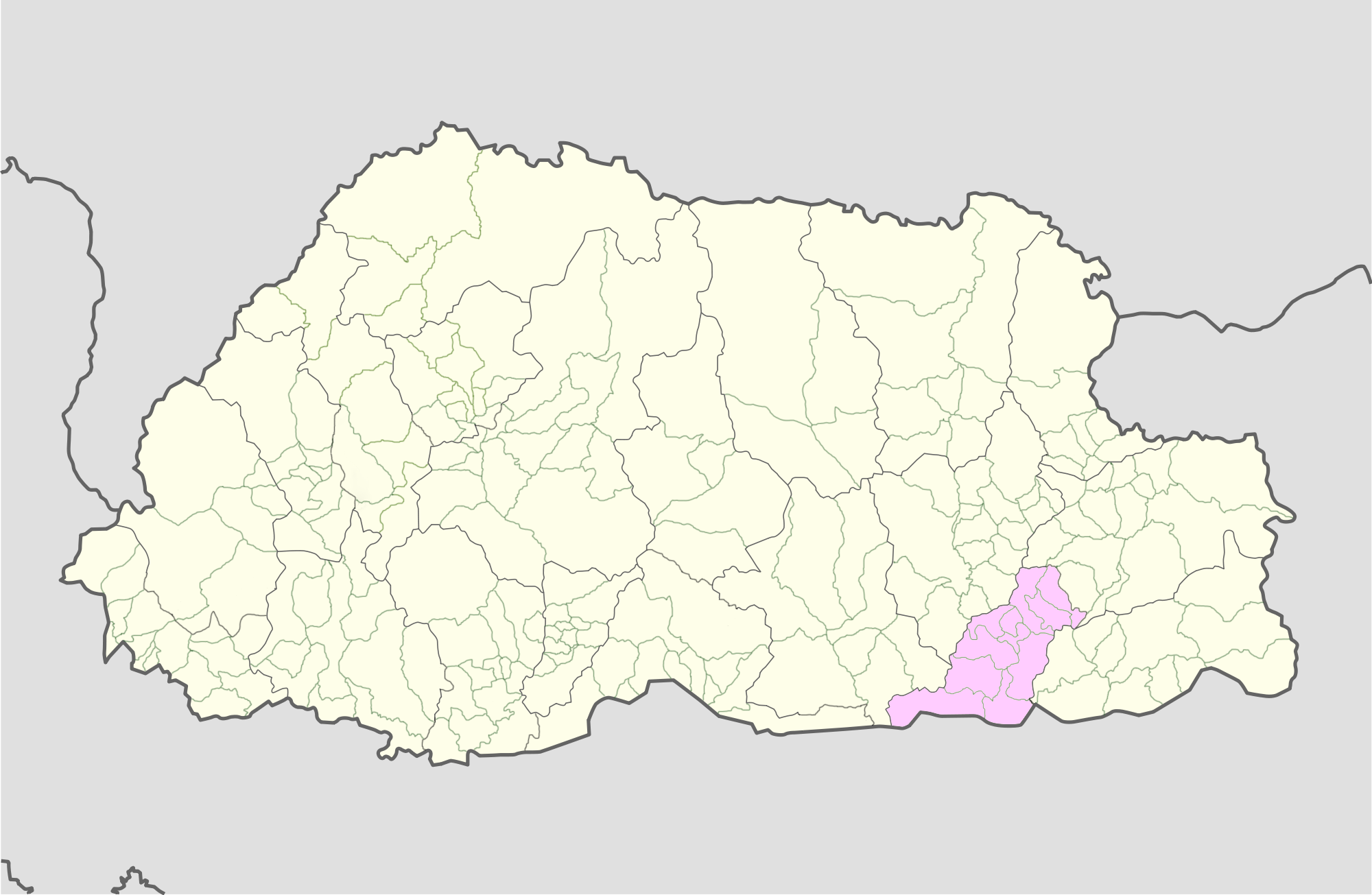
- Country: Bhutan
- District: Pemagatshel District
- Time zone: UTC+6 (BTT)

Nanong Gewog (Dzongkha: ན་ནོང་) is a Gewog (village block) of Pemagatshel District, Bhutan.

== Demographics ==
Nanong Gewog has 55 villages and 526 households with 2351 population. It has an area of 81.04 square kilometers. The Gewog has two BHU, RNR centre and three CPS.

== Geography ==
The Gewog has moderate cold temperate climate. The dry land cultivation dominates agriculture land use and paddy cultivation is minimal.

== Administration ==
The Gewog Administration consists of a Gup (Block Head), Mangmi, Tshogpas, Gewog Administration officer, and other civil servants as observers.

== Economy ==
Maize is the main cereal. Potato, orange, ginger, and sugarcane are also grown for cash income. Its potential exist for horticulture development in ginger, sugarcane, groundnut, orange and cereal crops like mustard, millet, buckwheat and maize. The establishment of piggery and poultry farms is also possible.

The constraints faced are remoteness from the main road, lack of access to market, lack of water irrigation, crop damage by wild animals and farm labour shortage.

== Education ==
Nanong Gewog has one central school, two primary schools, and two ECCDs.

== Tourism ==
Ngangshing Goenpa

The Lhakhang is located in Ngangshing of Bargoenpa village. Ngangshing Goenpa was built by Drubthob Kuenzang Lhuendup some 400 years ago. The Lhakhang was renovated in 2013. It serve as the community temple.

== Products ==
The Gewog is popular for satshoen (soil paints) for traditional painting and Tshatshi-buram (Bhutanese Sweet made from sugarcane juice). These two products are unique to this place.

== Potentials ==
Nanong Gewog falls under Nanong-Shumar constituency and its first member to the parliament (MP) was the Prime Minister of Bhutan. H.E. Lyenpo Jigme Thinley is the first democratically elected Prime Minister of Bhutan. He hails from Druk Phunsum Tshogpa (DPT) party.

== Chiwog ==
- Gashigkhar_Tshatshi
- Nanong
- Raling
- Tokari
- Terphug_Woongchhiloo

== Villages ==
- Tshatshe
- Rangshi Gayri
