= Chongshing Gewog =

Chongshing Gewog ལྕོང་ཤིང་
- Gewogs
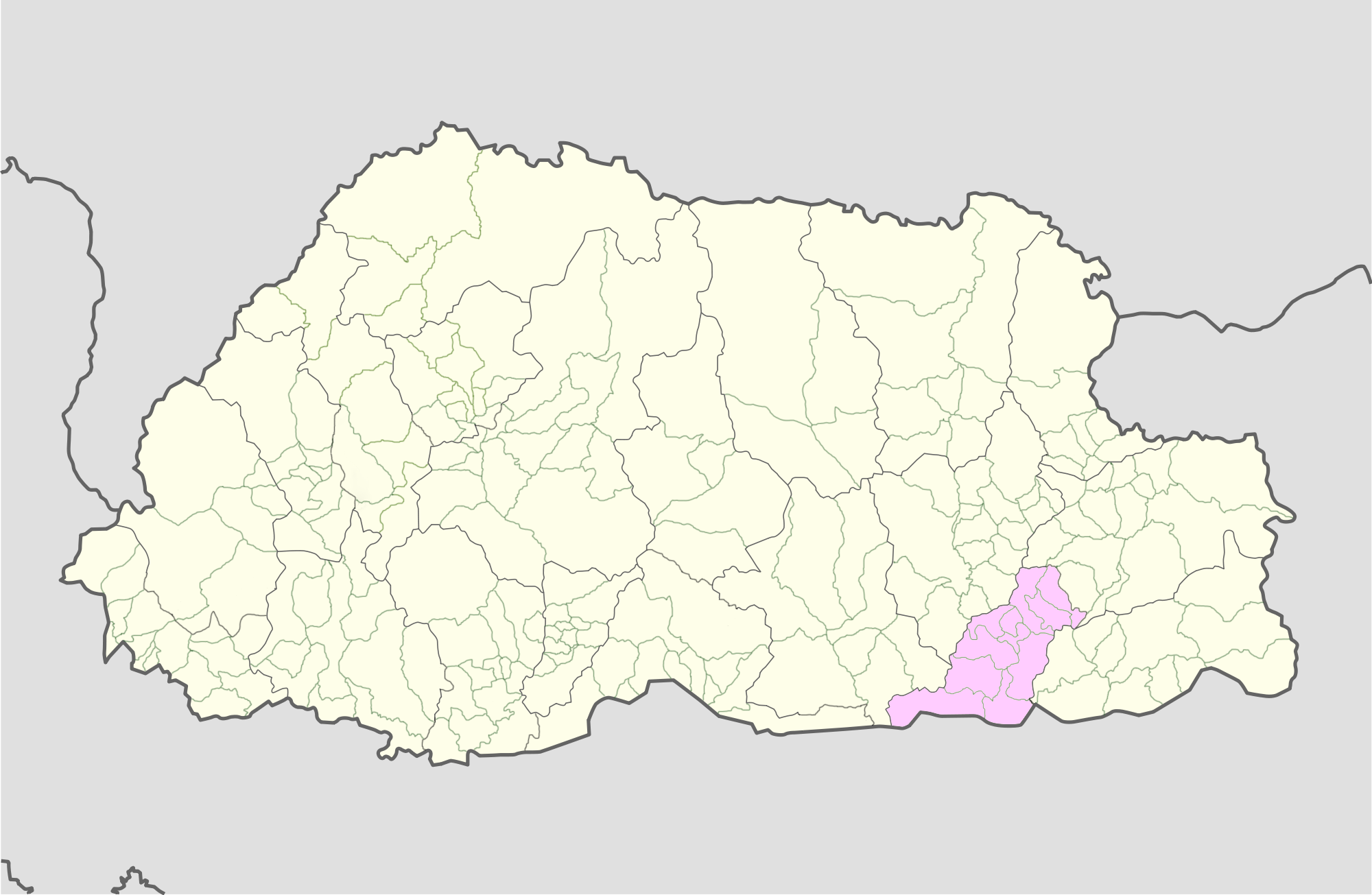
- Country: Bhutan
- District: Pemagatshel District
- Time zone: UTC+6 (BTT)

Chongshing Gewog (Dzongkha: ལྕོང་ཤིང་) is a gewog (village block) of Pemagatshel District, Bhutan.
