= Chimoong Gewog =

Chimoong Gewog ཕྱི་མུང་
- Gewogs
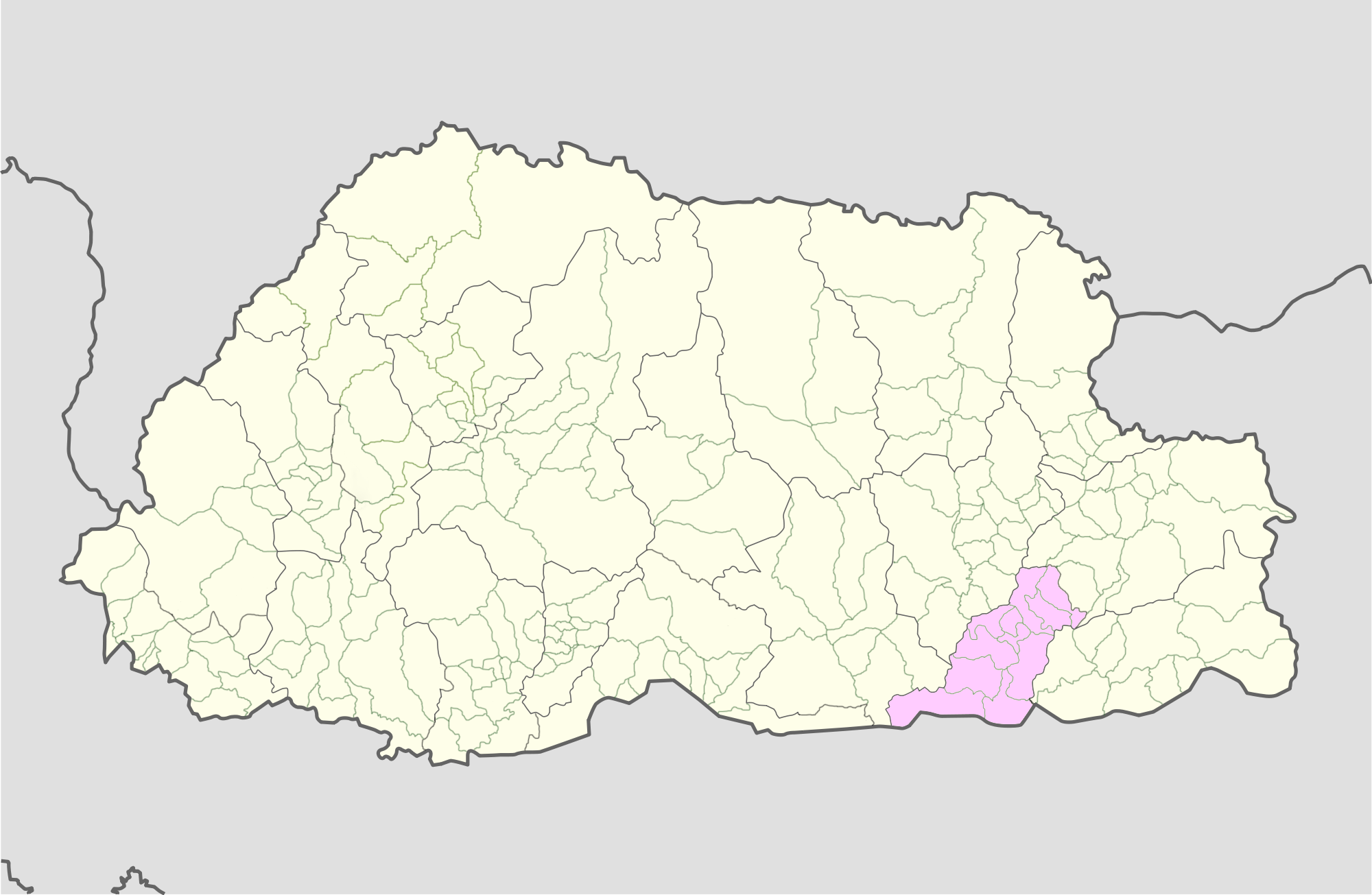
- Country: Bhutan
- District: Pemagatshel District
- Time zone: UTC+6 (BTT)

Chimoong Gewog (Dzongkha: ཕྱི་མུང་) is a gewog (village block) of Pemagatshel District, Bhutan.
