= Dungmaed Gewog =

Dungmaed Gewog གདུང་སྨད་
- Gewog
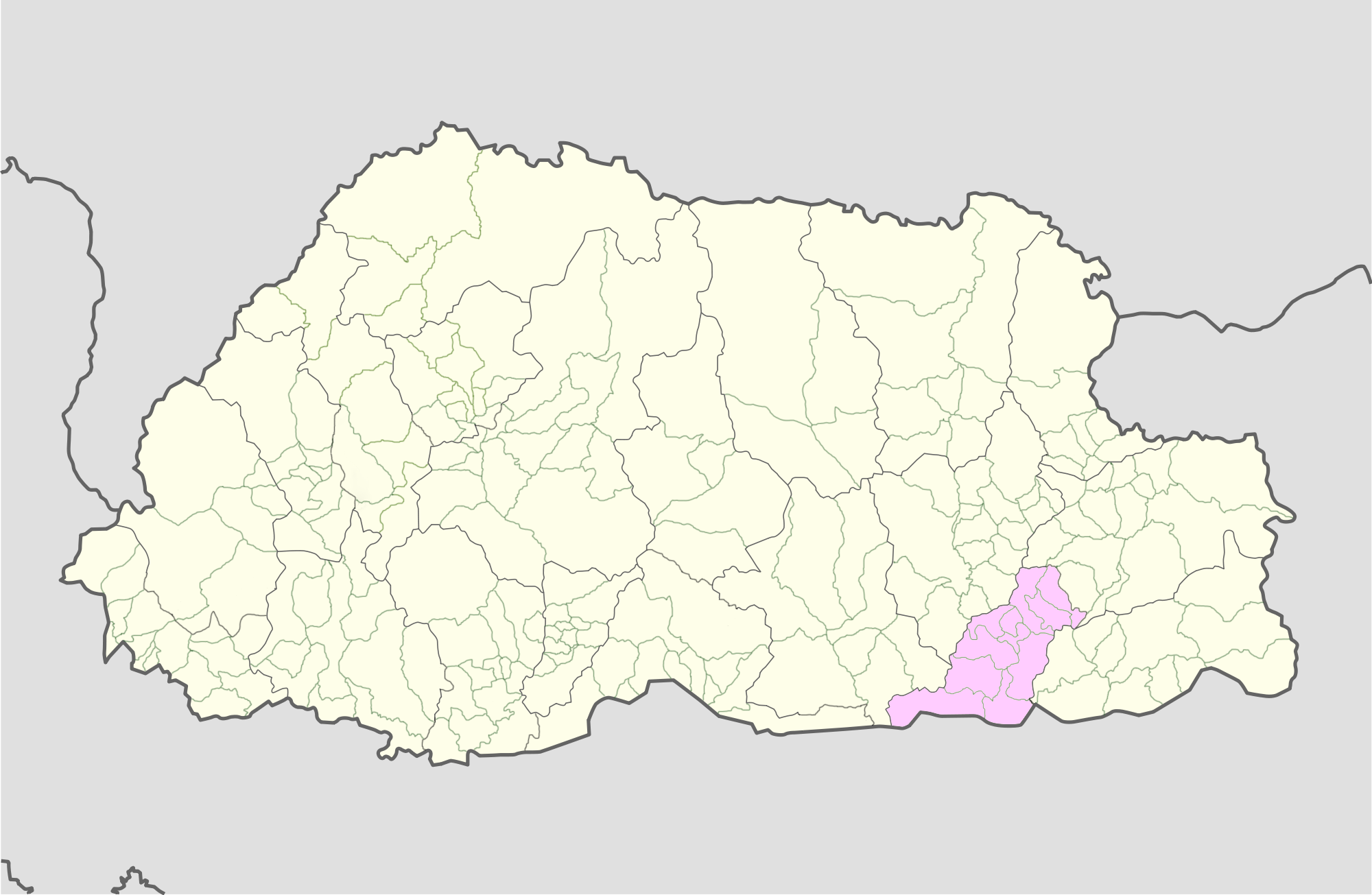
- Country: Bhutan
- District: Pemagatshel District
- Time zone: UTC+6 (BTT)

Dungmaed Gewog (Dzongkha: གདུང་སྨད་) (also called Dungme and Dungmin) is a gewog (village block) of Pemagatshel District, Bhutan.
