= Patshaling Gewog =

Patshaling Gewog པ་ཚ་གླིང་
- Gewog
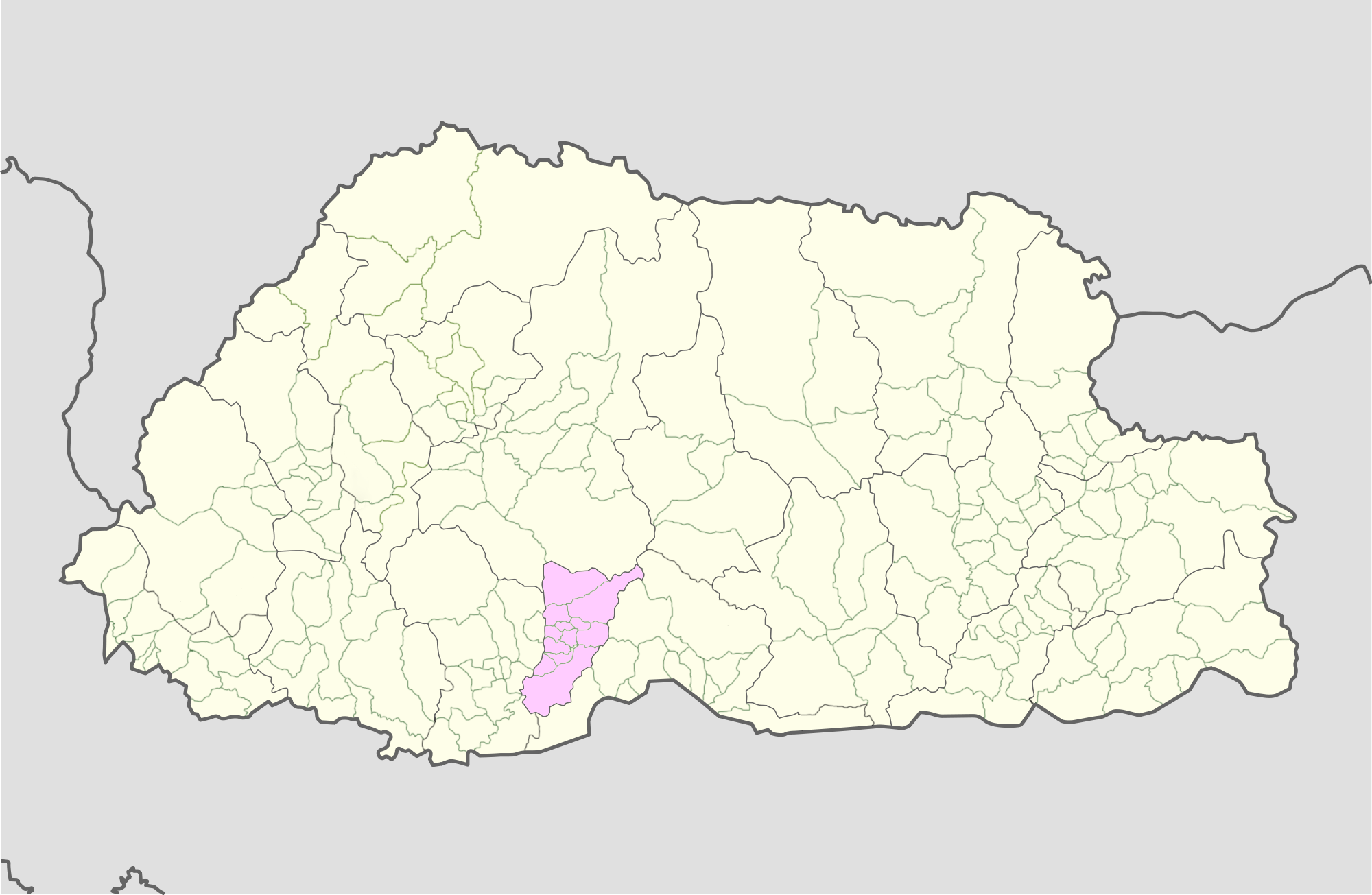
- Country: Bhutan
- District: Tsirang District
- Time zone: UTC+6 (BTT)

Patshaling Gewog (Dzongkha: པ་ཚ་གླིང་) is a gewog (village block) of Tsirang District, Bhutan. It was formerly called Patale.
