= Kherigonpa =

- Location in Bhutan
- Coordinates: 27°4′12″N 91°25′12″E
- Country: Bhutan
- District: Pemagatshel District

Population (2005)
  - Total: 141

Kherigonpa is a village in south-eastern Bhutan. It is located in Pemagatshel District.

At the 2005 census, its population was 141.
