= Phuentenchhu Gewog =

Phuentenchu Gewog སྤུང་རྟེན་ཆུ་
- Gewog
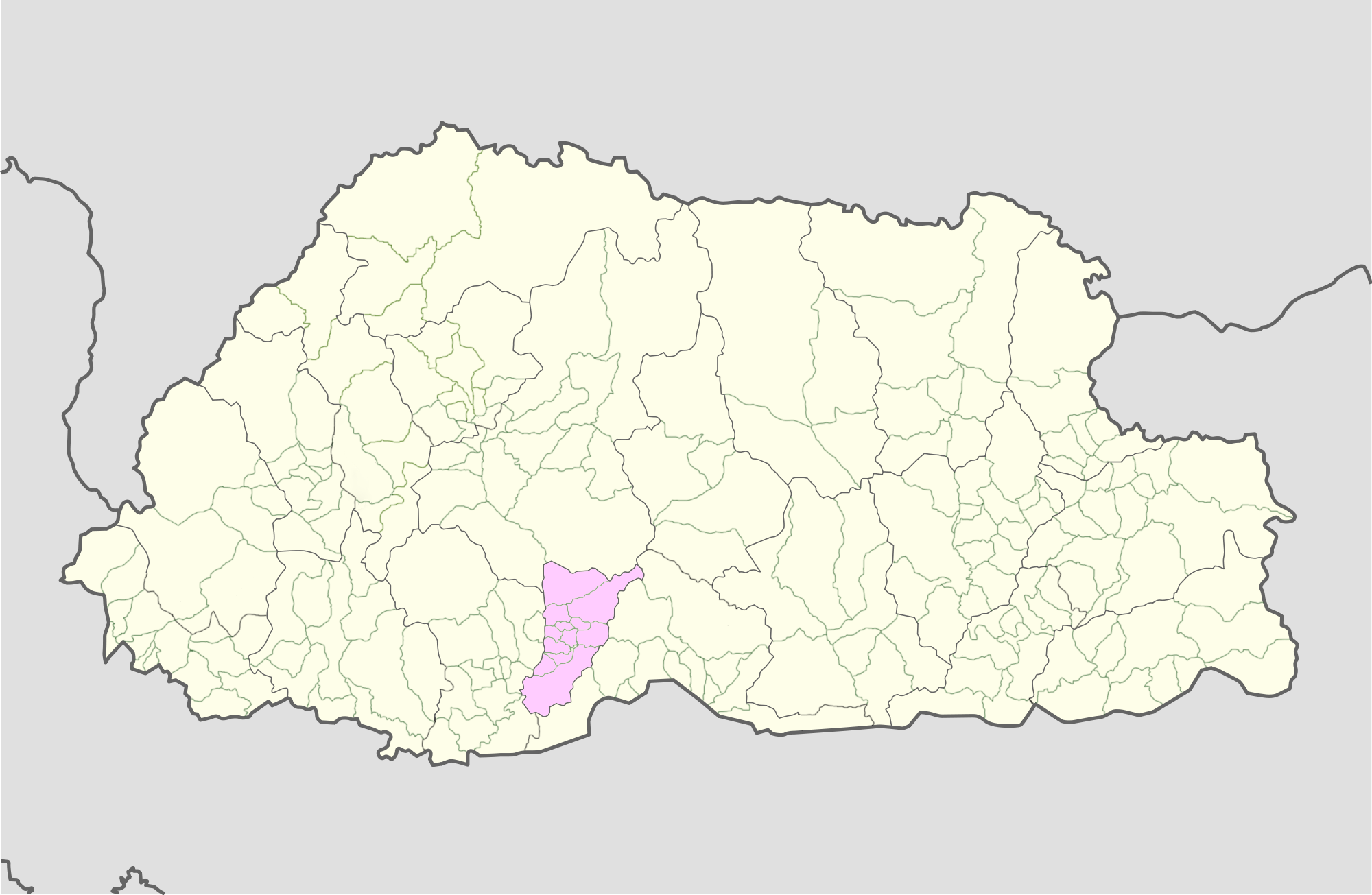
- Country: Bhutan
- District: Tsirang District
- Time zone: UTC+6 (BTT)

Phuentenchu Gewog (Dzongkha: སྤུང་རྟེན་ཆུ་) is a gewog (village block) of Tsirang District, Bhutan.
