= Shumar Gewog =

Shumar Gewog ཤུ་མར་
- Gewogs
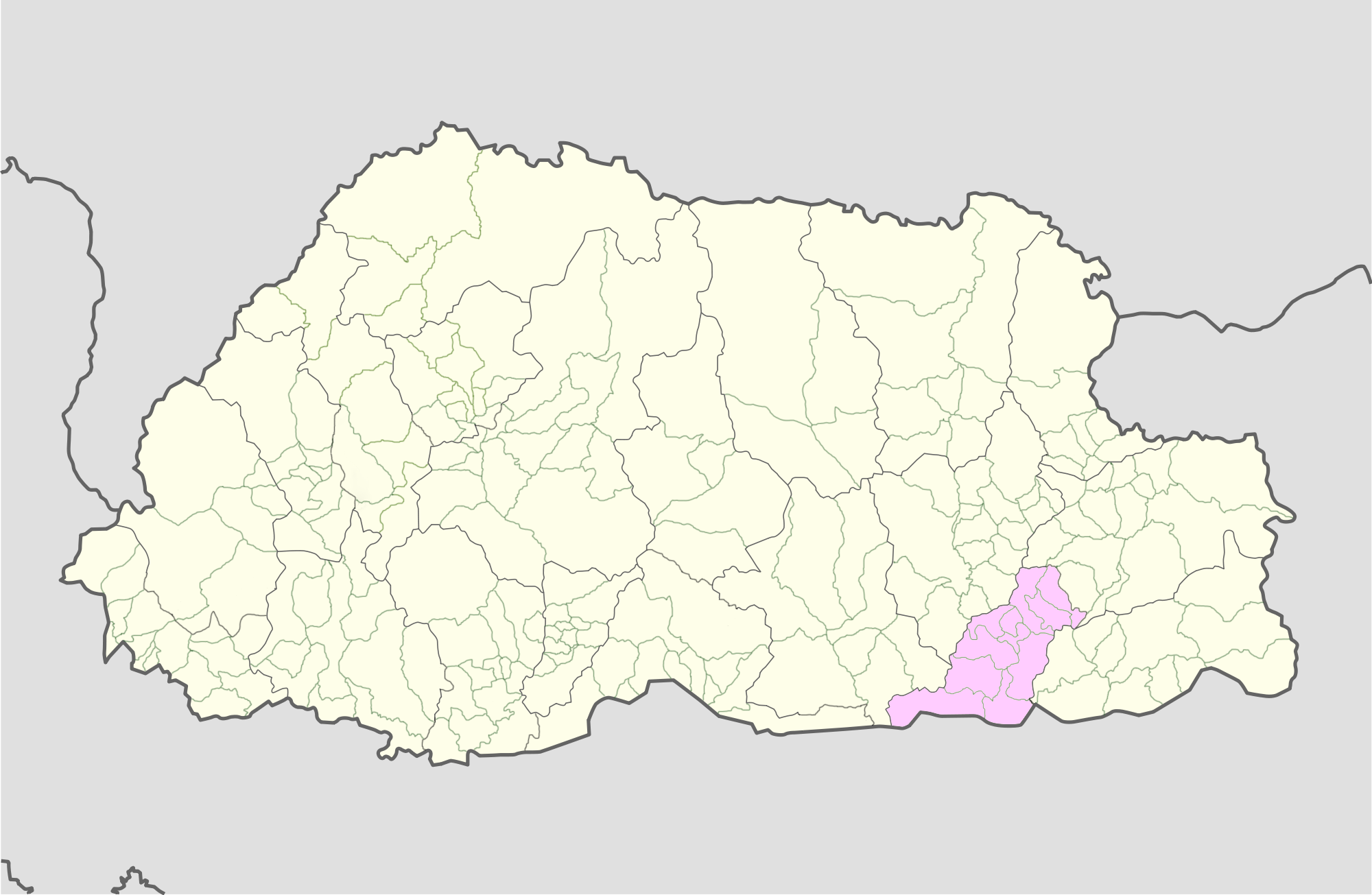
- Country: Bhutan
- District: Pemagatshel District
- Time zone: UTC+6 (BTT)

Shumar Gewog (Dzongkha: ཤུ་མར་) is a gewog (village block) in Pemagatshel District, Bhutan.

Shumar is one of the Gewogs in Pemagatshel Dzongkhag. It is the largest Gewog in the Dzongkhag with more 800 households and more than 11 villages. The Gewog Headman is Gup Lepo who was elected with yes/no votes due to only one contestant. Shumar Gewog is the most developed in the dzongkhag as the Dzongkhag headquarters being located in the Gewog. Shumar Village is the largest village comprising about 90 households in the Gewog and thus Gewog's name is Shumar.

Darchung is a small village under Shumar Village.
