= Kilkhorthang Gewog =

Kilkhorthang Gewog དཀྱིལ་འཁོར་ཐང་
- Gewog
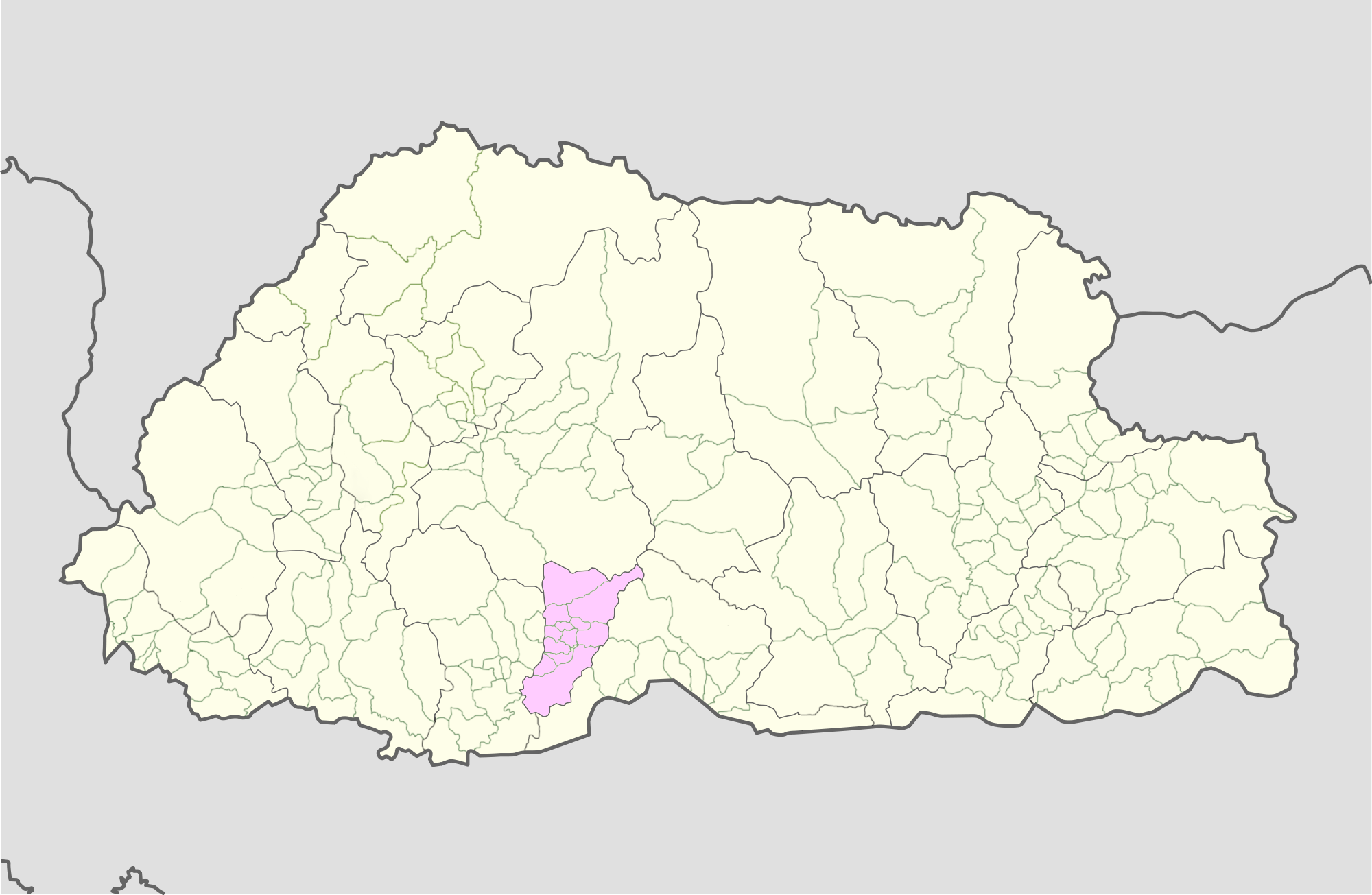
- Country: Bhutan
- District: Tsirang District
- Time zone: UTC+6 (BTT)

Kilkhorthang Gewog (Dzongkha: དཀྱིལ་འཁོར་ཐང་རྒེད་འོག) is a gewog (village block) of Tsirang District, Bhutan.
