= Pemagatsel =

- Nickname: Khidung
- Location in Bhutan
- Coordinates: 27°02′15″N 91°24′14″E
- Country: Bhutan
- District: Pema Gatshel District

Government
  - Type: Constitutional democratic monarchy

Area
- 400 sq mi (1,000 km^{2})
- Time zone: UTC+6 (BTT)
- Postal code: 44001
- Area code: 07

Pemagatsel, also transliterated as Pemagatshel, is a town in Pemagatshel District in eastern Bhutan.

== Climate ==
Climate data for Pemagatshel, elevation 1,618 m (5,308 ft), (1996–2017 normals, extremes 2005–2017)
Month	Jan	Feb	Mar	Apr	May	Jun	Jul	Aug	Sep	Oct	Nov	Dec	Year
Record high °C (°F)	22.0 (71.6)	24.0 (75.2)	27.0 (80.6)	27.0 (80.6)	29.0 (84.2)	30.0 (86.0)	31.0 (87.8)	28.5 (83.3)	29.0 (84.2)	28.5 (83.3)	26.0 (78.8)	22.0 (71.6)	31.0 (87.8)
Mean daily maximum °C (°F)	15.9 (60.6)	17.4 (63.3)	20.1 (68.2)	22.2 (72.0)	24.0 (75.2)	24.9 (76.8)	25.2 (77.4)	25.3 (77.5)	25.1 (77.2)	23.8 (74.8)	20.7 (69.3)	17.8 (64.0)	21.9 (71.4)
Daily mean °C (°F)	10.4 (50.7)	12.0 (53.6)	14.9 (58.8)	17.4 (63.3)	19.6 (67.3)	21.1 (70.0)	21.5 (70.7)	21.4 (70.5)	20.8 (69.4)	18.4 (65.1)	14.9 (58.8)	12.1 (53.8)	17.0 (62.7)
Mean daily minimum °C (°F)	4.8 (40.6)	6.6 (43.9)	9.7 (49.5)	12.6 (54.7)	15.1 (59.2)	17.2 (63.0)	17.8 (64.0)	17.5 (63.5)	16.5 (61.7)	12.9 (55.2)	9.0 (48.2)	6.4 (43.5)	12.2 (53.9)
Record low °C (°F)	−1.0 (30.2)	−1.5 (29.3)	3.0 (37.4)	8.0 (46.4)	11.5 (52.7)	14.0 (57.2)	15.0 (59.0)	14.7 (58.5)	11.5 (52.7)	7.0 (44.6)	2.0 (35.6)	2.5 (36.5)	−1.5 (29.3)
Average rainfall mm (inches)	8.7 (0.34)	25.5 (1.00)	94.2 (3.71)	141.4 (5.57)	150.9 (5.94)	328.0 (12.91)	427.3 (16.82)	290.3 (11.43)	188.8 (7.43)	99.6 (3.92)	6.1 (0.24)	3.5 (0.14)	1,764.3 (69.45)
Average relative humidity (%)	72.0	69.9	70.3	74.2	79.5	85.2	87.3	85.5	83.2	76.6	72.5	71.9	77.3
Source: National Center for Hydrology and Meteorology
