= Samdrup Jongkhar =

Samdrup Jongkhar བསམ་གྲུབ་ལྗོངས་མཁར་
- Location in Bhutan
- Coordinates: 26°48′N 91°30.3′E
- Country: Bhutan
- District: Samdrup Jongkhar

Area
  - Total: 4.47 km^{2} (1.73 sq mi)
- Elevation: 173 m (568 ft)

Population (2017)
  - Total: 9,325
  - Density: 2,090/km^{2} (5,400/sq mi)
- Time zone: UTC+6 (BTT)

Samdrup Jongkhar (Dzongkha:བསམ་གྲུབ་ལྗོངས་མཁར་) is a town and seat of Samdrup Jongkhar District in Bhutan.

The town is located at the south-eastern part of Bhutan and borders the Indian state of Assam. Though there is no clear historical record of the development of the town, it is said to have developed as a result of the construction of the Samdrup Jongkhar-Tashigang national highway in the 1960s. In the past the Sharchops of Tashigang, Dundsan, Orong and Yangtse used to trade in an Indian border town in Assam called Gudama (current day Daranga or Darranga Mela, better known as Mela Bazar). Today it is one of the most important trading towns for the eastern districts of Bhutan. Near the border is Hanumaan Mandir in NK Darranga, a temple run by Hanumaan Mandir Charity in which there are both Bhutan and Indian people member. After 2003, due to insurgency problems, much of the business was halted, causing a ripple effect on the developmental and socio-economic life of the people of most of eastern Bhutan.

Samdrup Jonkhar Dzongkhag has a mix of population largely dominated by the Sharchops and by Lhotshampas in Bangtar. It is also an important economic center of the country where coal mining is an important contribution to the country's economy.

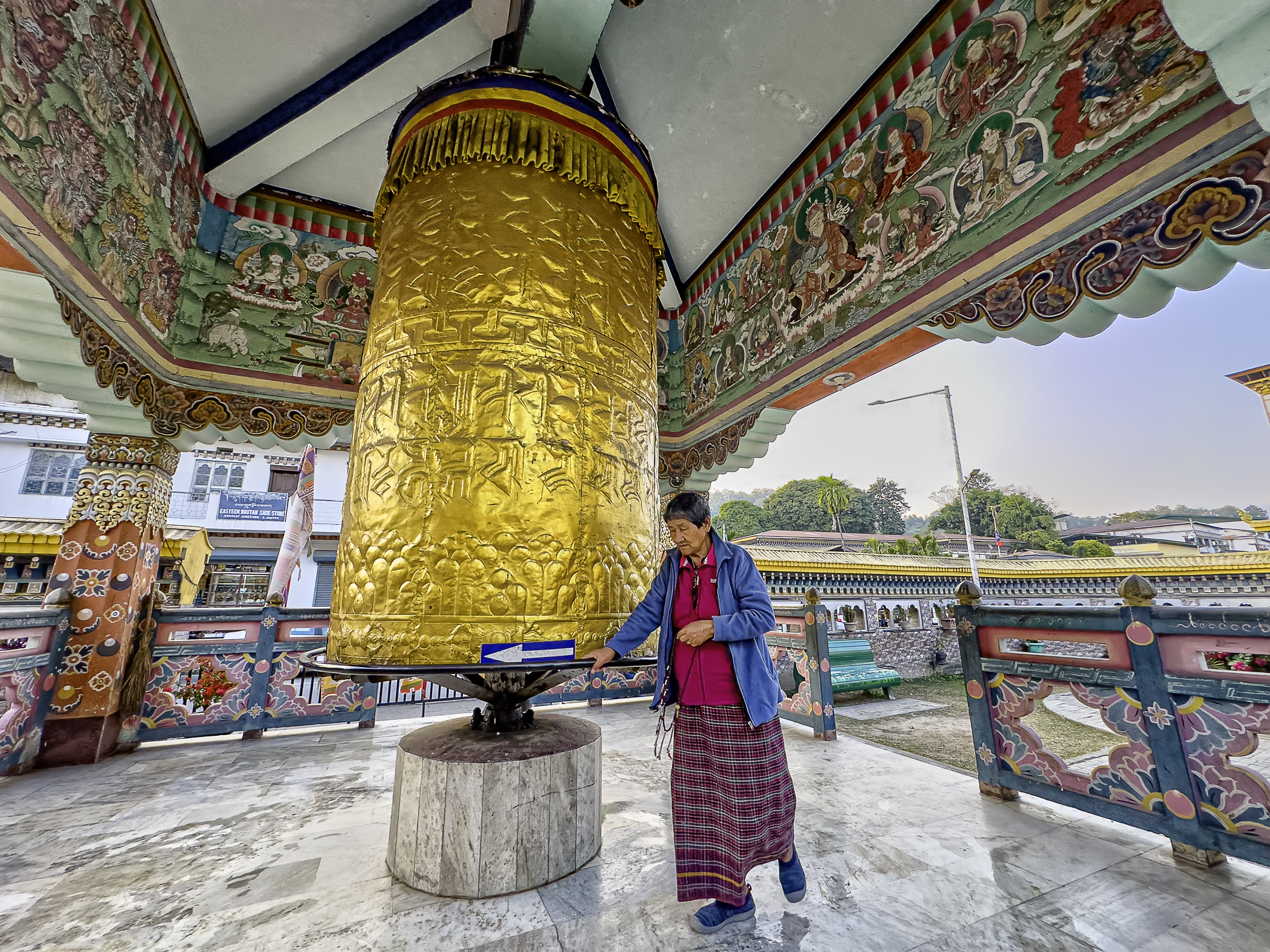
A prayer wheel, located at Town Center of Samdrup Jongkhar

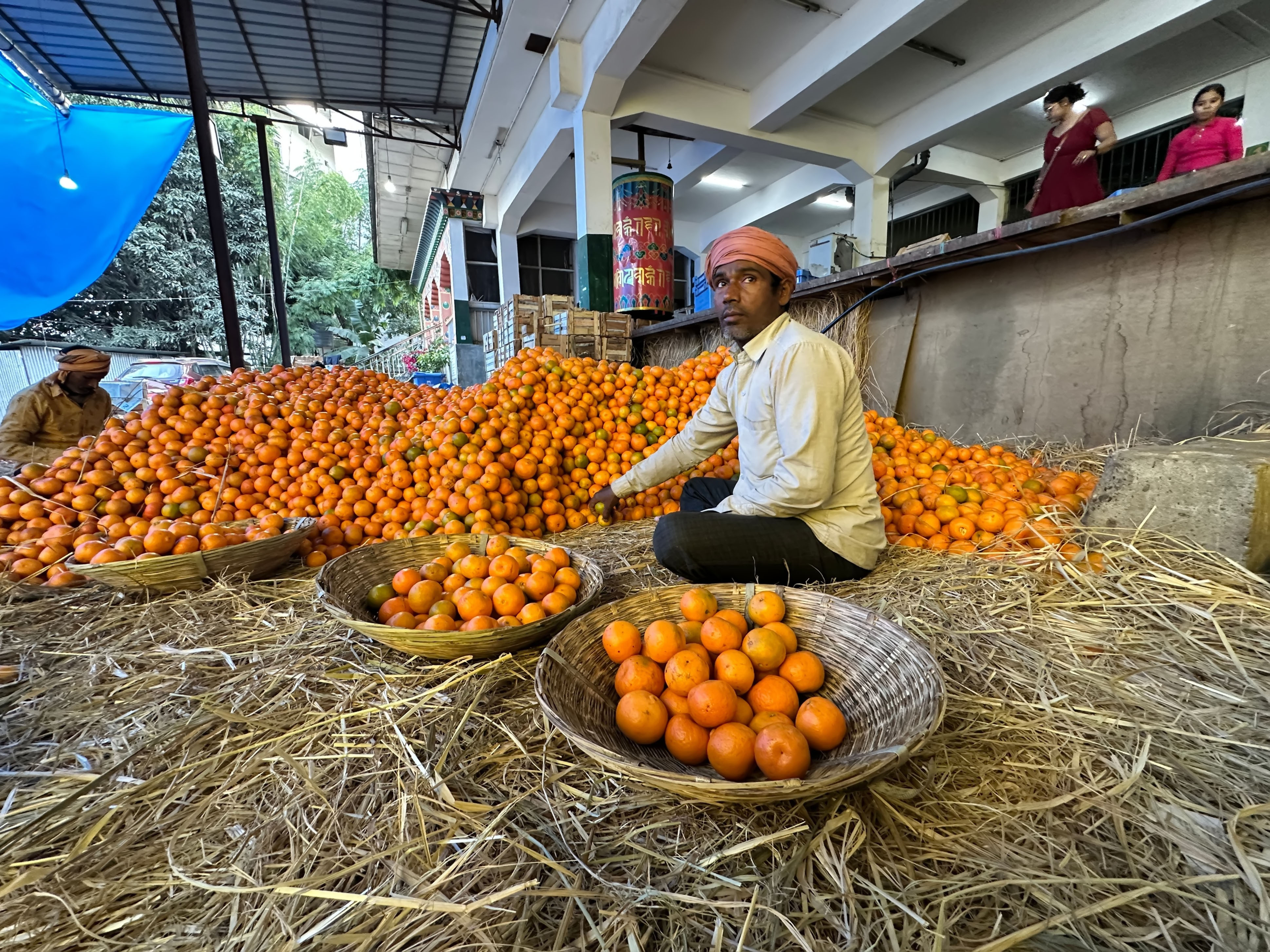
A worker sorts Citrus Mandarin at the Auction Yard of Food Corporation of Bhutan Limited in Samdrup Jongkhar

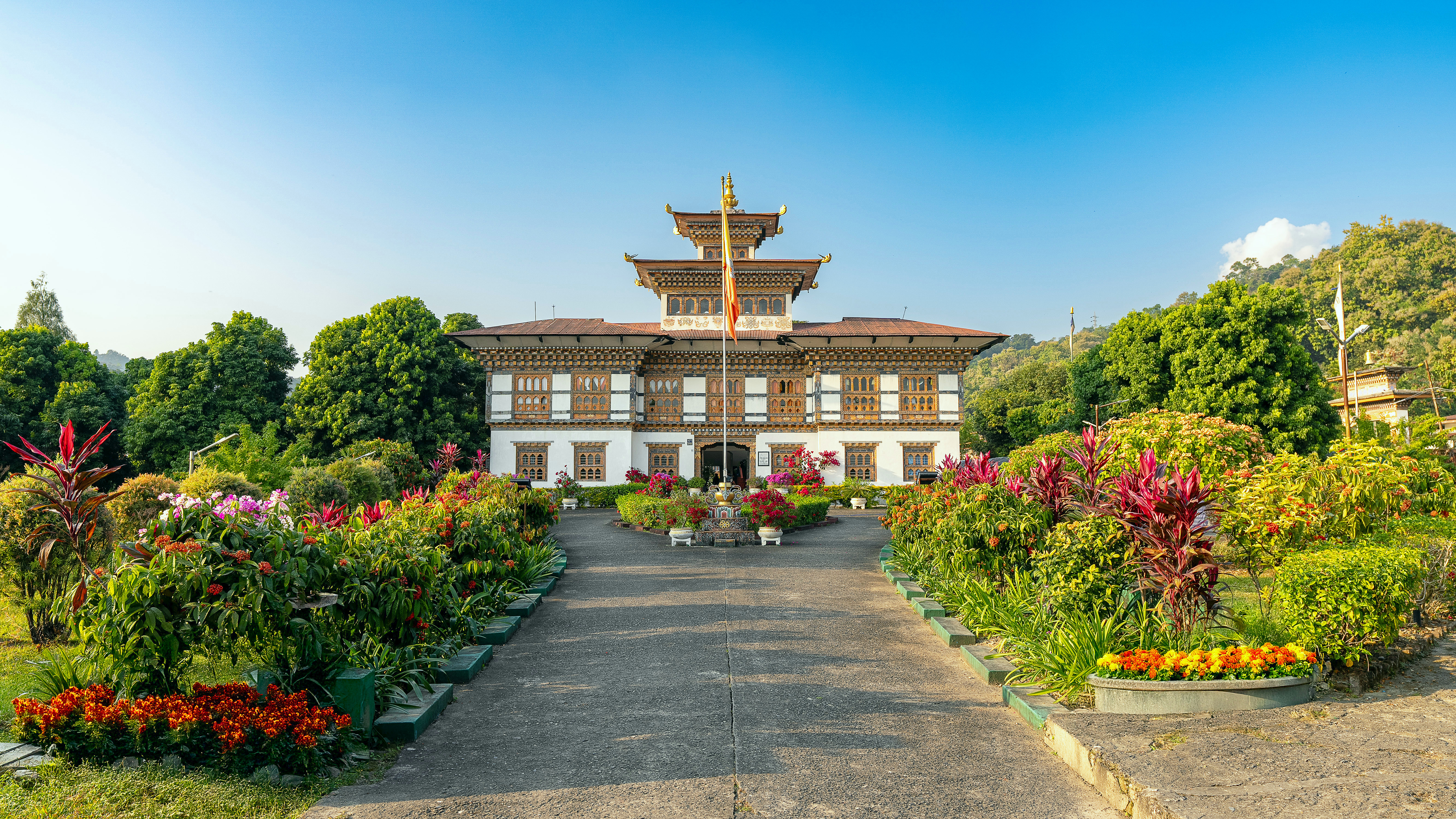
Dzongkhag Administration Office, Samdrup Jongkhar: Bhutan's Gateway to Governance and Tradition
