= Damphu, Tsirang =

Damphu
- Town
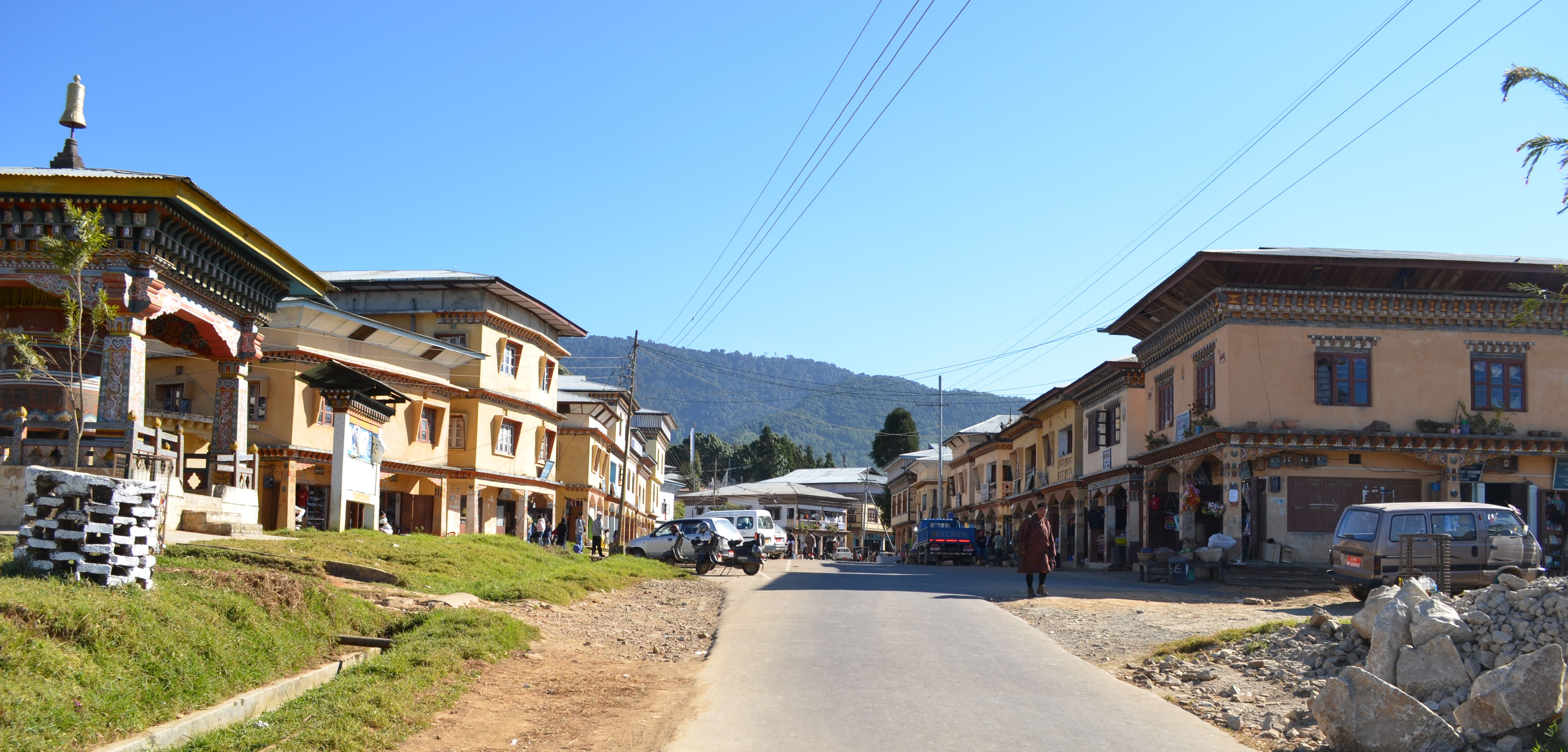

- Location in Bhutan
- Coordinates: 27°01′N 90°06′E
- Country: Bhutan
- District: Tsirang District
- Village block: Kilkhorthang Gewog

Population (2005)
  - Total: 1,666
- Time zone: UTC+6 (BTT)

Damphu is the administrative headquarters and capital of Tsirang District, Bhutan. It is located on the north–south highway running from Wangdue Phodrang to Sarpang and Gelephu on the border with India. It contains the Tsirang Dzong. At the 2005 census, its population was 1,666.

== Climate ==
Climate data for Damphu, Tsirang District, elevation 1,520 m (4,990 ft), (1996–2017 normals)
Month	Jan	Feb	Mar	Apr	May	Jun	Jul	Aug	Sep	Oct	Nov	Dec	Year
Record high °C (°F)	20.5 (68.9)	22.0 (71.6)	25.0 (77.0)	27.5 (81.5)	28.0 (82.4)	28.0 (82.4)	28.5 (83.3)	29.5 (85.1)	28.5 (83.3)	28.5 (83.3)	25.0 (77.0)	22.5 (72.5)	29.5 (85.1)
Mean daily maximum °C (°F)	14.4 (57.9)	16.0 (60.8)	18.9 (66.0)	21.1 (70.0)	22.6 (72.7)	23.4 (74.1)	23.5 (74.3)	24.0 (75.2)	23.5 (74.3)	22.0 (71.6)	19.2 (66.6)	16.3 (61.3)	20.4 (68.7)
Daily mean °C (°F)	9.6 (49.3)	11.3 (52.3)	14.4 (57.9)	17.3 (63.1)	19.4 (66.9)	20.9 (69.6)	21.3 (70.3)	21.5 (70.7)	20.7 (69.3)	17.9 (64.2)	14.4 (57.9)	11.3 (52.3)	16.7 (62.0)
Mean daily minimum °C (°F)	4.7 (40.5)	6.6 (43.9)	9.8 (49.6)	13.4 (56.1)	16.2 (61.2)	18.4 (65.1)	19.1 (66.4)	18.9 (66.0)	17.8 (64.0)	13.8 (56.8)	9.5 (49.1)	6.3 (43.3)	12.9 (55.2)
Record low °C (°F)	0.5 (32.9)	−0.5 (31.1)	3.0 (37.4)	7.0 (44.6)	10.5 (50.9)	12.5 (54.5)	13.5 (56.3)	13.8 (56.8)	13.5 (56.3)	6.5 (43.7)	4.5 (40.1)	−1.0 (30.2)	−1.0 (30.2)
Average rainfall mm (inches)	9.2 (0.36)	15.2 (0.60)	39.5 (1.56)	69.9 (2.75)	120.9 (4.76)	312.2 (12.29)	460.6 (18.13)	341.0 (13.43)	207.1 (8.15)	106.4 (4.19)	1.8 (0.07)	5.0 (0.20)	1,688.8 (66.49)
Average relative humidity (%)	73.4	74.0	71.3	75.8	82.3	88.0	90.8	89.0	86.0	79.4	75.9	73.4	79.9
Source: National Center for Hydrology and Meteorology

== Gallery ==
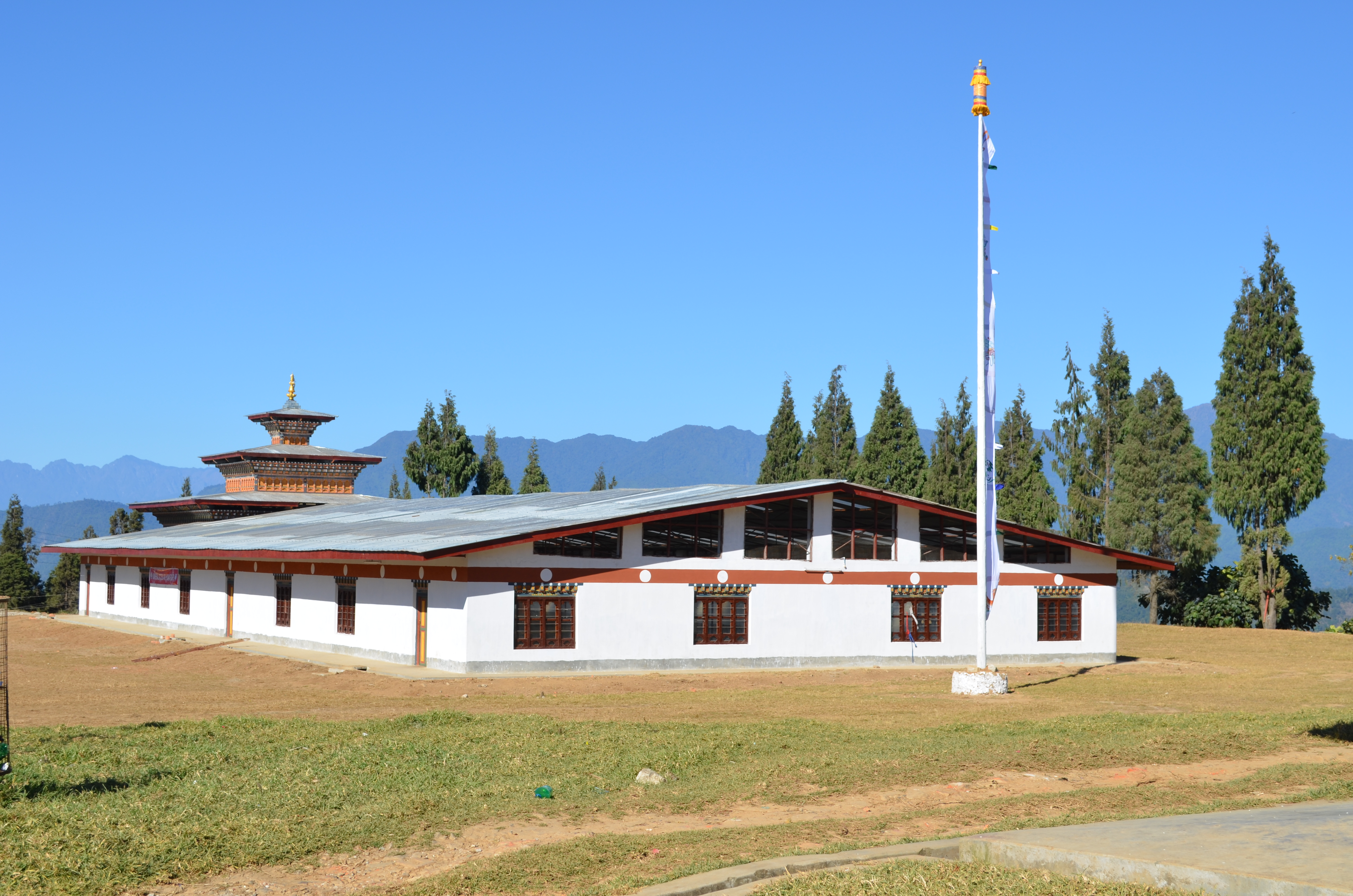
Moenlamthang, Community Hall
