= Tsirang District =

District of Bhutan

Coordinates: 26°55′N 90°5′E

Tsirang District རྩི་རང་རྫོང་ཁག།
- District
- Tsirang Dzongkhag
- Location of Tsirang district within Bhutan
- Country: Bhutan
- Headquarters: Damphu

Area
  - Total: 639 km^{2} (247 sq mi)

Population (2017)
  - Total: 22,376
  - Density: 35.0/km^{2} (90.7/sq mi)
- Time zone: UTC+6 (BTT)
- HDI (2019): 0.629 medium · 8th
- Website: www.tsirang.gov.bt

Tsirang District (Dzongkha: རྩི་རང་རྫོང་ཁག།; Wylie: tsi-rang rdzong-khag; previously Chirang) is one of the 20 dzongkhags (districts) of Bhutan. The administrative center of the district is Damphu.

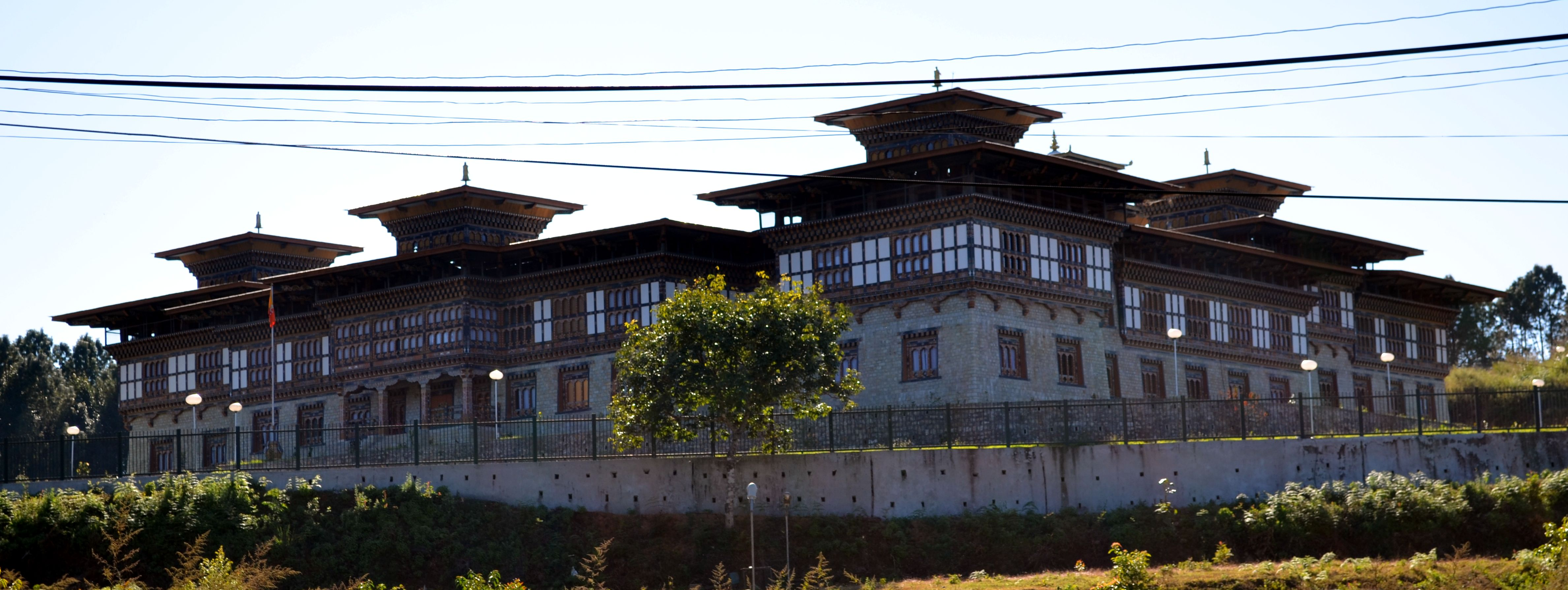
Tsirang Dzong at Damphu, Bhutan.

Tsirang is noted for its gentle slopes and mild climates. The dzongkhag is also noted for its rich biodiversity; however, it is one of the few dzongkhags without a protected area. One of Bhutan's longest rivers, the Punatsang Chhu flows through the district. Lhoptshampa, Ngalong and other ethnic groups resides in the district. Tsirang Toed Ngalong ( North Tsirang Ngalong ) are the early settlers of the district predating later Lhoptshampa settlers. It has many beautiful places such as Rigsum Pemai Dumra, Pemachoeling Heritage Forest, Tsirang Namgyel Chholing Dratshang, and Nye.

== Languages ==
The dominant language in Tsirang is Nepali, but it can be partially different from that spoken in Nepal, spoken by the heterogeneous Lhotshampa like Bhujel, Magar, Tamang, Gurung, Limbu, Rai, etc. In the north of Tsirang, Dzongkha, the national language, is also spoken.

== Administrative divisions ==
Tsirang District is divided into twelve village blocks (or gewogs):

- Gairigaon/Barshong Gewog
- Dunglegang Gewog
- Gosarling Gewog
- Kikhorthang Gewog
- Lamidara/Mendrelgang Gewog
- Bataney/Patshaling Gewog
- Phutenchhu Gewog
- Rangthangling Gewog
- Semjong Gewog
- Sergithang Gewog
- Tsholingkhar Gewog
- Tsirangtoe Gewog

== Geography ==
Tsirang covers a total area of 639 sq km. The northernmost reaches of Tsirang District (the gewogs of Phutenchhu and Sergithang) lie within Jigme Singye Wangchuck National Park, one of the protected areas of Bhutan.

== Education ==
Currently Tsirang District has three Central Schools (which operate at a level higher than 'Lower Secondary'): Tsirangtoed Central School, Mendrelgang Central School and Damphu Central School

== Climate ==
Climate data for Damphu, Tsirang District, elevation 1,520 m (4,990 ft), (1996–2017 normals)
Month	Jan	Feb	Mar	Apr	May	Jun	Jul	Aug	Sep	Oct	Nov	Dec	Year
Record high °C (°F)	20.5 (68.9)	22.0 (71.6)	25.0 (77.0)	27.5 (81.5)	28.0 (82.4)	28.0 (82.4)	28.5 (83.3)	29.5 (85.1)	28.5 (83.3)	28.5 (83.3)	25.0 (77.0)	22.5 (72.5)	29.5 (85.1)
Mean daily maximum °C (°F)	14.4 (57.9)	16.0 (60.8)	18.9 (66.0)	21.1 (70.0)	22.6 (72.7)	23.4 (74.1)	23.5 (74.3)	24.0 (75.2)	23.5 (74.3)	22.0 (71.6)	19.2 (66.6)	16.3 (61.3)	20.4 (68.7)
Daily mean °C (°F)	9.6 (49.3)	11.3 (52.3)	14.4 (57.9)	17.3 (63.1)	19.4 (66.9)	20.9 (69.6)	21.3 (70.3)	21.5 (70.7)	20.7 (69.3)	17.9 (64.2)	14.4 (57.9)	11.3 (52.3)	16.7 (62.0)
Mean daily minimum °C (°F)	4.7 (40.5)	6.6 (43.9)	9.8 (49.6)	13.4 (56.1)	16.2 (61.2)	18.4 (65.1)	19.1 (66.4)	18.9 (66.0)	17.8 (64.0)	13.8 (56.8)	9.5 (49.1)	6.3 (43.3)	12.9 (55.2)
Record low °C (°F)	0.5 (32.9)	−0.5 (31.1)	3.0 (37.4)	7.0 (44.6)	10.5 (50.9)	12.5 (54.5)	13.5 (56.3)	13.8 (56.8)	13.5 (56.3)	6.5 (43.7)	4.5 (40.1)	−1.0 (30.2)	−1.0 (30.2)
Average rainfall mm (inches)	9.2 (0.36)	15.2 (0.60)	39.5 (1.56)	69.9 (2.75)	120.9 (4.76)	312.2 (12.29)	460.6 (18.13)	341.0 (13.43)	207.1 (8.15)	106.4 (4.19)	1.8 (0.07)	5.0 (0.20)	1,688.8 (66.49)
Average relative humidity (%)	73.4	74.0	71.3	75.8	82.3	88.0	90.8	89.0	86.0	79.4	75.9	73.4	79.9
Source: National Center for Hydrology and Meteorology

== See also ==
- Districts of Bhutan
