= Pemagatshel District =

District of Bhutan

Coordinates: 27°0′N 91°15′E

Pemagatshel District པད་མ་དགའ་ཚལ་རྫོང་ཁག།
- District
- Seal

- Location of Pemagatshel district within Bhutan
- Country: Bhutan
- Headquarters: Pemagatsel

Area
  - Total: 1,030 km^{2} (400 sq mi)

Population (2017)
  - Total: 23,632
  - Density: 22.9/km^{2} (59.4/sq mi)
- Time zone: UTC+6 (BTT)
- HDI (2019): 0.608 medium · 12th
- Website: www.pemagatshel.gov.bt

Pemagatshel District (Dzongkha: པདྨ་དགའ་ཚལ་་རྫོང་ཁག།; Wylie: Pema-gatshel rdzong-khag) is one of the 20 Dzongkhags (districts) in Bhutan.

Until 1970 the district was known as Khoi Dung. Dudjom Rinpoche named the district Pemagatshel which translates to "Blissful Land of the Lotus"- Pema means the Lotus and gatshel is blissful land. It is said that if one stands at the location of old Pemagatshel dzong and look around, the place resemble a full bloomed lotus.

== Dzongkhag profile ==
Pemagatshel is located in the south east of Bhutan with an area of 517.8 km^{2} and has a total of 2,547 households. The dzongkhag is characterized by highly dissected mountain ranges, steep slopes and narrow valleys with little flat land. The elevation in the dzongkhag ranges from 1,000 meters to 3,500 meters above the sea level. The dzongkhag experiences an average annual rainfall of 1500 mm to 3000 mm.

The dzongkhag is administratively divided into eleven gewogs. Rugged terrain and scattered settlements make the delivery of services in the dzongkhag both difficult as well as expensive.

About 53% of the total area is under forest cover, mainly coniferous and broadleaf species. With about 45% of the total land area under cultivation, the dzongkhag has a good percentage of arable land. Land holdings are, however, dominated by Tseri cultivation with only negligible wetland farming activities. Dry land cultivation is also a dominant agricultural practice with maize grown as the main cereal crop.

The potential for the development of horticulture crops like cardamom, ginger and oranges exist in some gewogs like Khar, Dungme and Chongshing Borang but is constrained by the lack of access to roads and markets. Other problems faced by most farmers include the lack of water sources for irrigation and extensive wildlife crop depredation.

In 2001, education was provided to 3740 students by a total of 16 schools ranging from primary to middle secondary schools while health services were delivered by a dzongkhag general hospital, four basic health units and 22 outreach clinics. A total of 88 rural water supply schemes provide piped drinking water facility. Agriculture and livestock extension services are provided by six RNR extension centers, two agriculture extension centers, two Livestock Extension center and a one fodder seed production center.

Inadequate power supply, limited road accessibility and market outlets constitute major challenges to development in the dzongkhag. Off-farm employment in gypsum mines; roads and other construction works constitute an important source of income for the people. The production of cultural and religious items such as jalings, dhungs, Thonphupoe, ngazhing jurmo tea leaves, and Yurung bura (textile) also generate cash income. The commissioning of Kurichu Power Project and the provision of adequate electricity supply can go a long way in accelerating economic and social development activities in the dzongkhag.

== Language ==
Native speak Tshangla (Sharchopkha), an East Bodish language that is the lingua franca of eastern Bhutan.

== Population ==
The Pemagatshel district, as of 2005, had a population of 13,864. In February 2011, some 42 households in remote areas of Pemagatshel were slated for relocation closer to population centers in order to provide better access to resources, both natural and governmental. Proponents for this move cited Gross National Happiness as a reason to improve living standards through relocation. This model, if successful, would be replicated in Haa and Lhuentse Districts.

== Vision ==
"A progressive Dzongkhag built on the foundation of economic prosperity, social cohesion and efficient services."

== Mission ==
“Economic Prosperity, Social Cohesion and Efficient Services”

== Administrative divisions ==
Pemagatshel District is divided into eleven village blocks (or gewogs):

- Chhimung Gewog
- Choekhorling Gewog
- Chongshing Borang Gewog
- Dechenling Gewog
- Dungmaed Gewog
- Khar Gewog
- Nanong Gewog
- Norbugang Gewog
- Shumar Gewog
- Yurung Gewog
- Zobel Gewog

== Geography ==
Southwestern Pemagatshel (the gewog of Norbugang) contains part of Royal Manas National Park.

== Tourism ==
Yongla Riwo Pelbar Dargeychhoeling Gonpa

Yongla Riwo Pelbar Dargeychhoeling Gonpa or the Pelri Gonpa, widely known today as Yongla Gonpa is one of the most well known monasteries under Pemagatshel Dzongkhag in eastern Bhutan. It is located on top of a mountaintop that resembles Phurba or Ritual dagger. The monastery was founded by Kheydrup Jigme Kundel from Darlung Kha in Wang, Thimphu in the 18th century.

Kheri Goenpa

Kheri Goenpa temple was built by Kuenga Wangpo, the son of Terton Pema Lingpa in the 15th century. It is located above Kheri Goenpa town. The Lhakhang houses holy statues of Buddha, Guru Rinpoche and Chenrigzi. An annual festival is conducted on the 10th day of the 4th month of the Bhutanese calendar.

Jashar Goenpa

Jashar Anim Goenpa was built by Anim Woesel Choden, the disciple of Togden Shakya Shri in 1958. Later, H.E. Gyeltshen Trulku constructed a monastery. Today, the Goenpa is home to more than 50 Anims studying there.

== Climate ==
Climate data for Pemagatshel, elevation 1,618 m (5,308 ft), (1996–2017 normals, extremes 2005–2017)
Month	Jan	Feb	Mar	Apr	May	Jun	Jul	Aug	Sep	Oct	Nov	Dec	Year
Record high °C (°F)	22.0 (71.6)	24.0 (75.2)	27.0 (80.6)	27.0 (80.6)	29.0 (84.2)	30.0 (86.0)	31.0 (87.8)	28.5 (83.3)	29.0 (84.2)	28.5 (83.3)	26.0 (78.8)	22.0 (71.6)	31.0 (87.8)
Mean daily maximum °C (°F)	15.9 (60.6)	17.4 (63.3)	20.1 (68.2)	22.2 (72.0)	24.0 (75.2)	24.9 (76.8)	25.2 (77.4)	25.3 (77.5)	25.1 (77.2)	23.8 (74.8)	20.7 (69.3)	17.8 (64.0)	21.9 (71.4)
Daily mean °C (°F)	10.4 (50.7)	12.0 (53.6)	14.9 (58.8)	17.4 (63.3)	19.6 (67.3)	21.1 (70.0)	21.5 (70.7)	21.4 (70.5)	20.8 (69.4)	18.4 (65.1)	14.9 (58.8)	12.1 (53.8)	17.0 (62.7)
Mean daily minimum °C (°F)	4.8 (40.6)	6.6 (43.9)	9.7 (49.5)	12.6 (54.7)	15.1 (59.2)	17.2 (63.0)	17.8 (64.0)	17.5 (63.5)	16.5 (61.7)	12.9 (55.2)	9.0 (48.2)	6.4 (43.5)	12.2 (53.9)
Record low °C (°F)	−1.0 (30.2)	−1.5 (29.3)	3.0 (37.4)	8.0 (46.4)	11.5 (52.7)	14.0 (57.2)	15.0 (59.0)	14.7 (58.5)	11.5 (52.7)	7.0 (44.6)	2.0 (35.6)	2.5 (36.5)	−1.5 (29.3)
Average rainfall mm (inches)	8.7 (0.34)	25.5 (1.00)	94.2 (3.71)	141.4 (5.57)	150.9 (5.94)	328.0 (12.91)	427.3 (16.82)	290.3 (11.43)	188.8 (7.43)	99.6 (3.92)	6.1 (0.24)	3.5 (0.14)	1,764.3 (69.45)
Average relative humidity (%)	72.0	69.9	70.3	74.2	79.5	85.2	87.3	85.5	83.2	76.6	72.5	71.9	77.3
Source: National Center for Hydrology and Meteorology

Climate data for Dechenling, Pemagatshel District, elevation 1,000 m (3,300 ft), (2005–2017 normals)
Month	Jan	Feb	Mar	Apr	May	Jun	Jul	Aug	Sep	Oct	Nov	Dec	Year
Mean daily maximum °C (°F)	18.7 (65.7)	19.7 (67.5)	23.1 (73.6)	23.5 (74.3)	25.4 (77.7)	26.1 (79.0)	26.6 (79.9)	26.8 (80.2)	26.2 (79.2)	24.9 (76.8)	22.4 (72.3)	19.5 (67.1)	23.6 (74.4)
Daily mean °C (°F)	13.5 (56.3)	14.7 (58.5)	18.2 (64.8)	20.2 (68.4)	22.3 (72.1)	23.4 (74.1)	24.3 (75.7)	24.4 (75.9)	23.3 (73.9)	20.9 (69.6)	17.5 (63.5)	14.5 (58.1)	19.8 (67.6)
Mean daily minimum °C (°F)	8.2 (46.8)	9.7 (49.5)	13.3 (55.9)	16.9 (62.4)	19.2 (66.6)	20.7 (69.3)	21.9 (71.4)	22.0 (71.6)	20.3 (68.5)	16.9 (62.4)	12.6 (54.7)	9.4 (48.9)	15.9 (60.7)
Average rainfall mm (inches)	27.2 (1.07)	18.8 (0.74)	75.3 (2.96)	399.9 (15.74)	538.6 (21.20)	1,014.1 (39.93)	1,082.5 (42.62)	550.3 (21.67)	465.1 (18.31)	81.0 (3.19)	7.8 (0.31)	2.3 (0.09)	4,262.9 (167.83)
Average relative humidity (%)	76.7	75.1	69.5	78.8	80.9	82.3	85.5	87.5	85.6	76.4	71.8	73.0	78.6
Source: National Center for Hydrology and Meteorology (rain 2006–2017)

== See also ==
- Districts of Bhutan
- Gypsum, Bhutan
- Kherigonpa
- Kurmaed Province
- Khothakpa
- Mongling
- Nangkhor
