= Chengmari =

Settlement in Bhutan

Coordinates: 26°55′N 89°02′E

Chengmari is a settlement in both India and Bhutan. The Bhutanese half of Chengmari, named Yangphelthang (Bhimtar) is located between Samtse and Sibsu in Norbugang Gewog, Samtse District and Indian half Chengmari tea gardens lies in the Jalpaiguri district in the Indian State of West Bengal.

Chengmari is home to the largest tea estate in Asia that produces over 3 million kilograms of black tea and around a million kilograms of green tea. The tea estate significantly contributes to the lives of more than 12000 people living in the area.

Chengmari railway station lies on the Indian state of West Bengal.
