= Dophoogchen Gewog =

Dophoogchen Gewog རྡོ་ཕུག་ཅན་ Dorokha Gewog
- Gewog
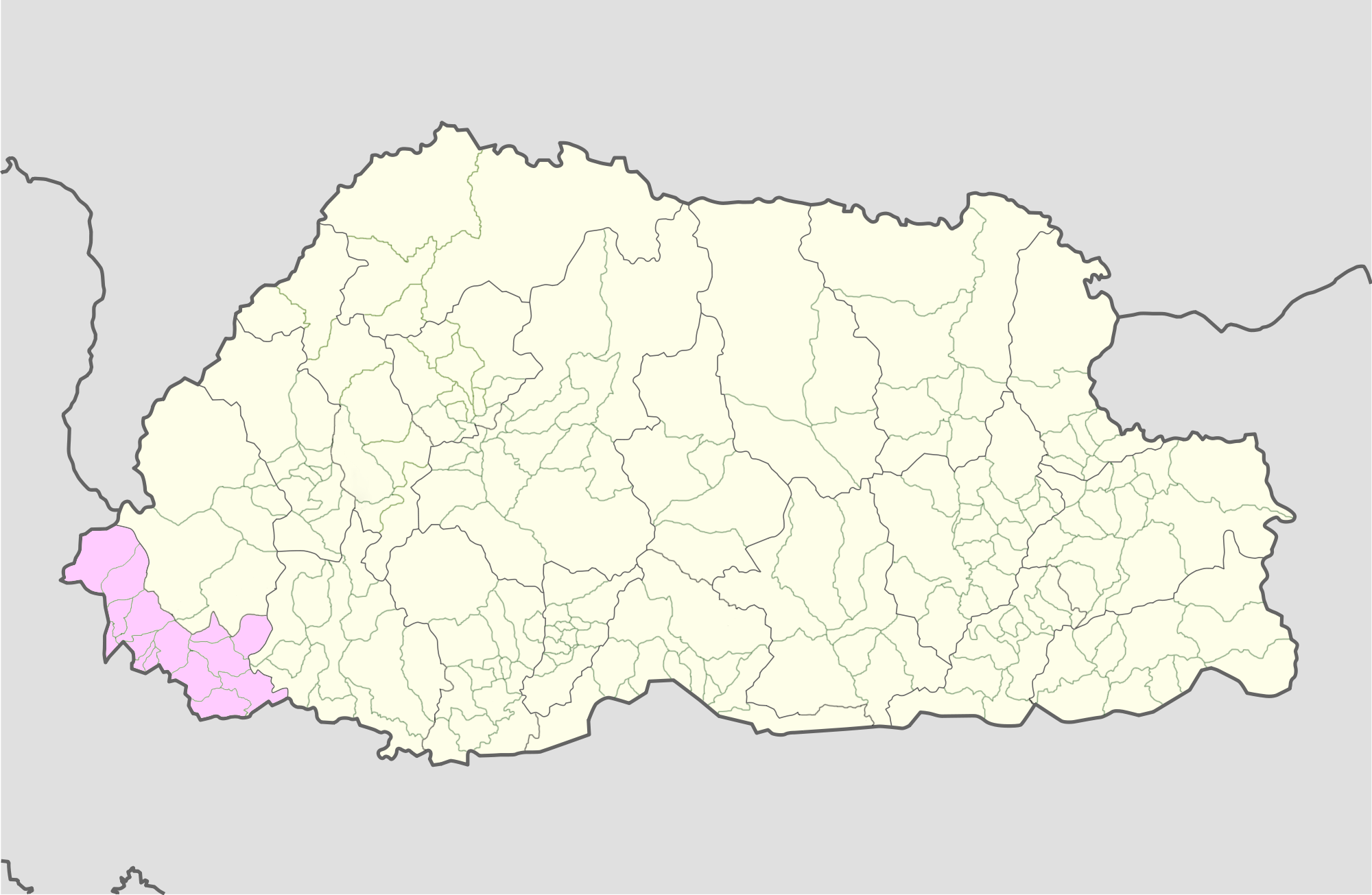
- Country: Bhutan
- District: Samtse District
- Time zone: UTC+6 (BTT)

Dophoogchen Gewog (Note: Alternative spelling: Dophuchen.)(Dzongkha: རྡོ་ཕུག་ཅན་, romanized: rdo phug cen), or Dorokha Gewog, is a gewog (village block) of Samtse District, Bhutan. Dophoogchen Gewog is part of Dophoogchen Dungkhag (sub-district), which comprise Dorokha and Denchukha Gewogs.

The people here speak Lhotshamkha and are predominantly Hindus. It is connected with road from Samtse town, Phuntsholing, and Haa via Tergola. The nearest town, and district headquarters, is Samtse, about 3 hours driven from the Drungkhag.

The road networks connect most of the remote parts of the Geog, including Sengdhyen, a Doya or Lhop community.
