= Norgaygang Gewog =

Norgaygang ནོར་རྒྱས་སྒང་
- Gewogs
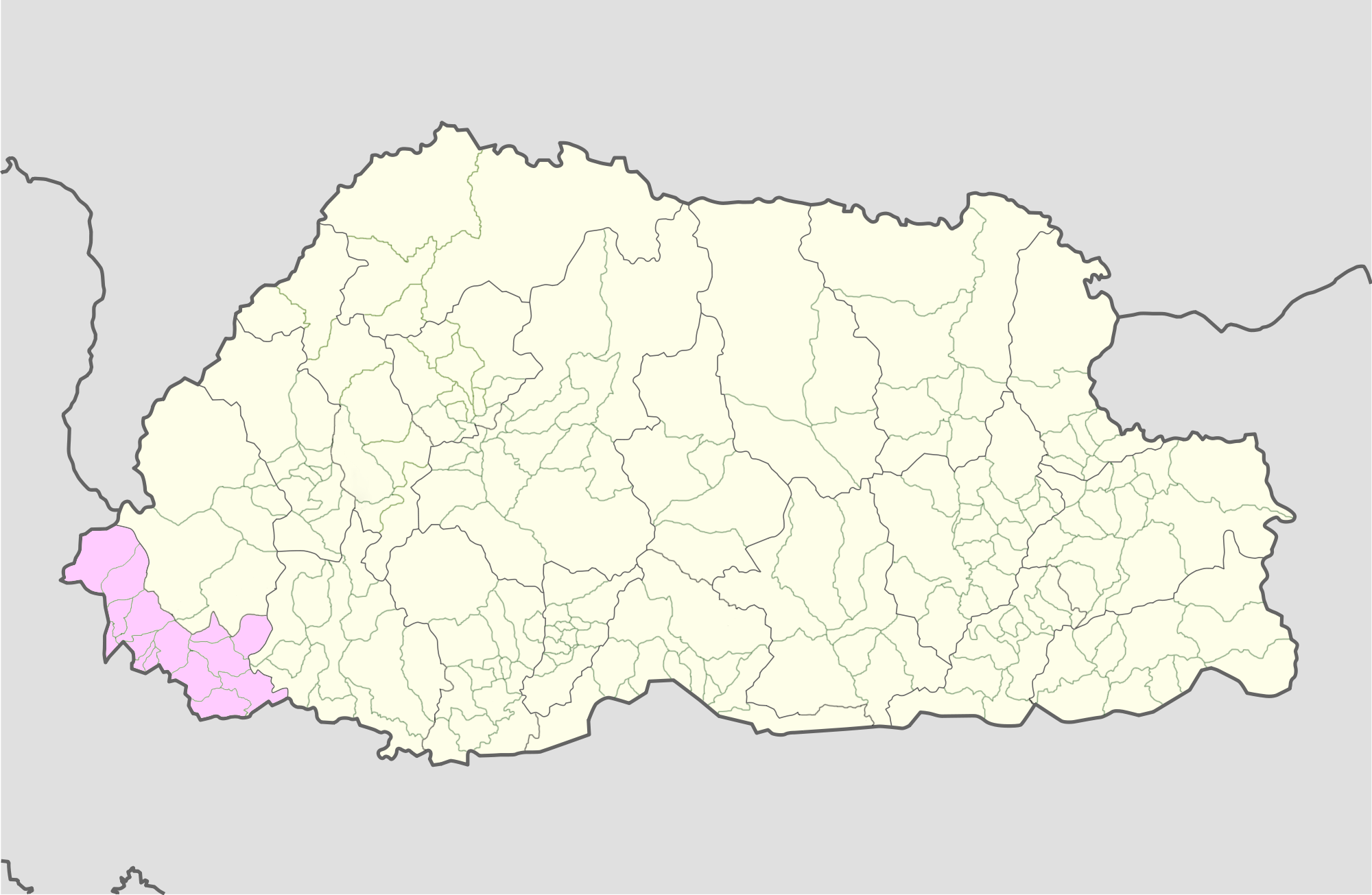
- Norgaygang in the Samtse District of Bhutan
- Coordinates: 27°07′32″N 88°50′52″E
- Country: Bhutan
- District: Samtse District

Area
  - Total: 187.51 km^{2} (72.40 sq mi)

Population (2012)
  - Total: 3,381
- Time zone: UTC+6 (BTT)

Norgaygang Gewog (Dzongkha: ནོར་རྒྱས་སྒང་) is a gewog (village block) of Samtse District, Bhutan. It is located at the extreme northwest of the Samtse District bordering on India's West Bengal (Kalimpong) and Sikkim (East Sikkim) provinces. It has the Haa District to the northeast and Samtse's Tendruk Gewog to the southeast.

The Norgaygang gewog is immediately to the south of the Zompelri ridge and Mount Gipmochi, which have been subject to the India-China-Bhutan border dispute. The Dichu (Jaldhaka) river flows through the gewog along with its numerous tributaries. The largest of the tributaries is Asam Khola rising below the Mount Gipmochi.

The Norgaygang Gewog occupies an area of 187.51 square kilometres (72.40 sq mi). It has 19 villages in 6 Chiwogs. In 2012, it had a population of 3,381. The Gewog comprises part of Tashicholing Dungkhag (sub-district), together with Tendu, Pemaling, Namgaychhoeling, and Tashicholing Gewogs.
