= Norbugang Gewog =

Norbugang Gewog may refer to:

- Norbugang Gewog (Pemagatshel)
- Norbugang Gewog (Samtse)
