= Pagli Gewog =

- Gewog
- Country: Bhutan
- District: Samtse District
- Time zone: UTC+6 (BTT)

Pagli Gewog is a former gewog (village block) of Samtse District, Bhutan.
