= Chukha District =

District of Bhutan

Coordinates: 27°0′N 89°30′E

Chukha District ཆུ་ཁ་རྫོང་ཁག།
- District
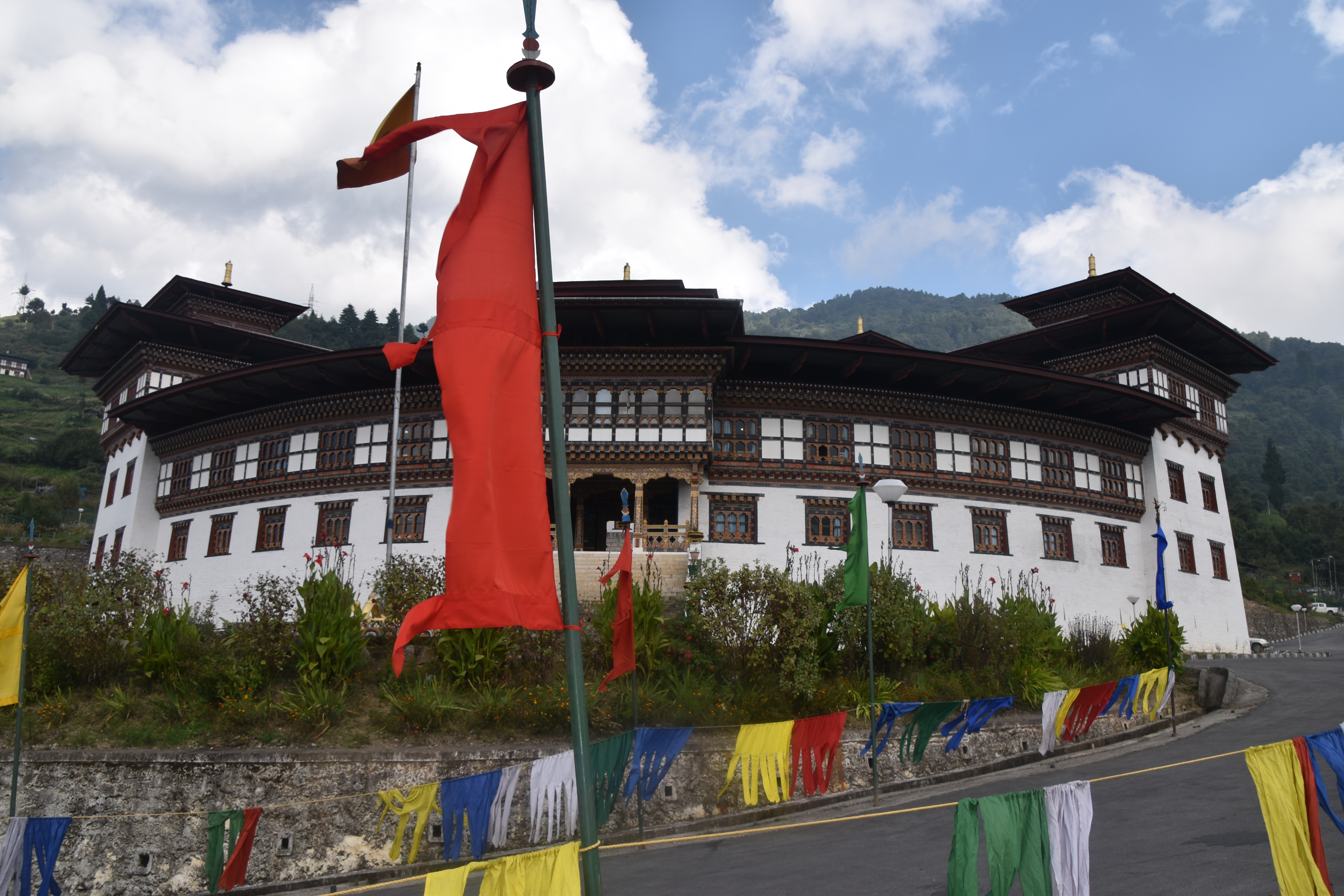
- Chukha Dzong

- Seal

- Location of Chukha district within Bhutan
- Country: Bhutan
- Headquarters: Mebisa

Area
  - Total: 1,880 km^{2} (730 sq mi)

Population (2017)
  - Total: 68,966
  - Density: 36.7/km^{2} (95.0/sq mi)
- Time zone: UTC+6 (BTT)
- HDI (2019): 0.684 medium · 4th
- Website: www.chhukha.gov.bt

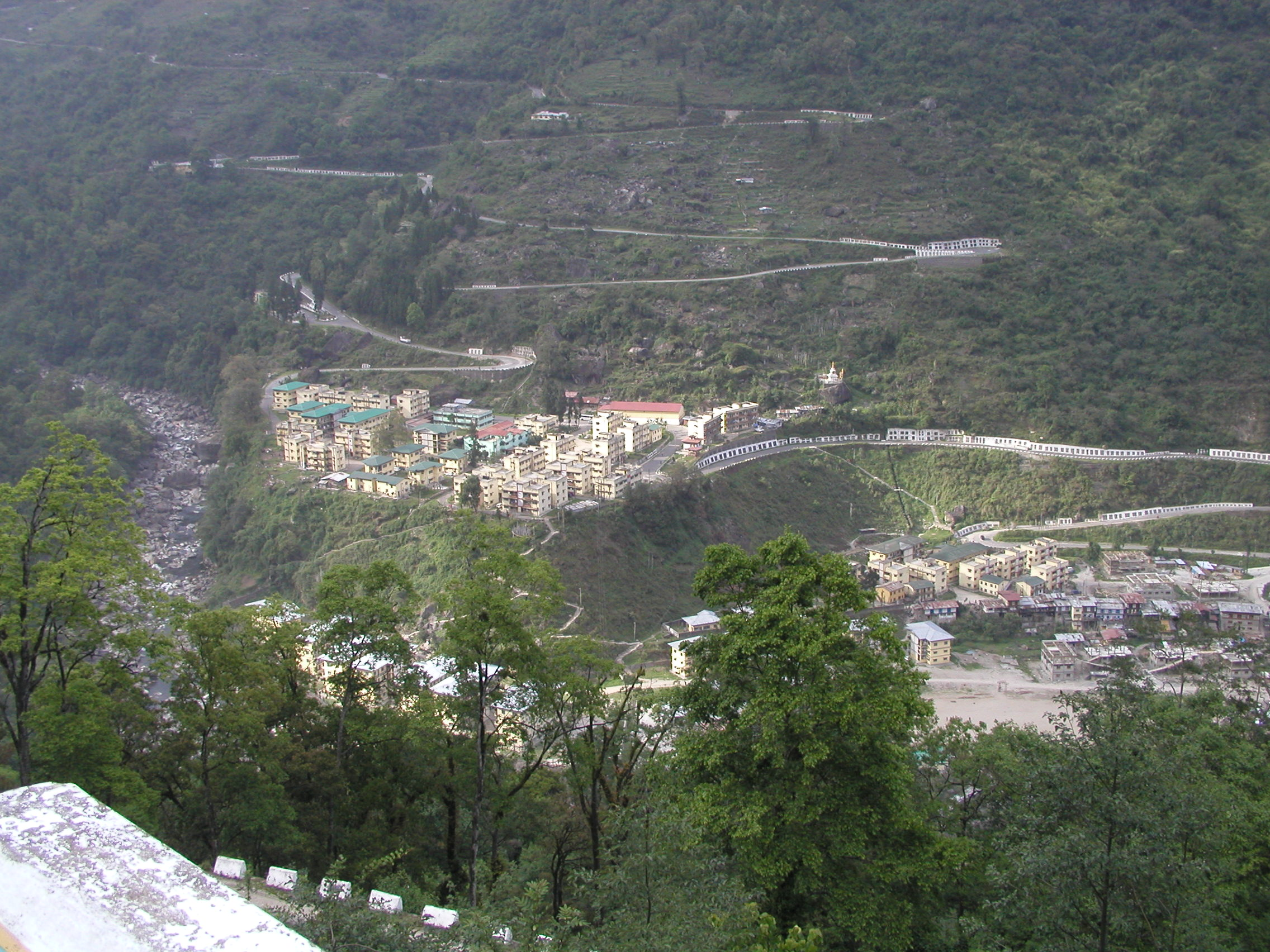
View of Chukha (Mepetsa), Chukha District

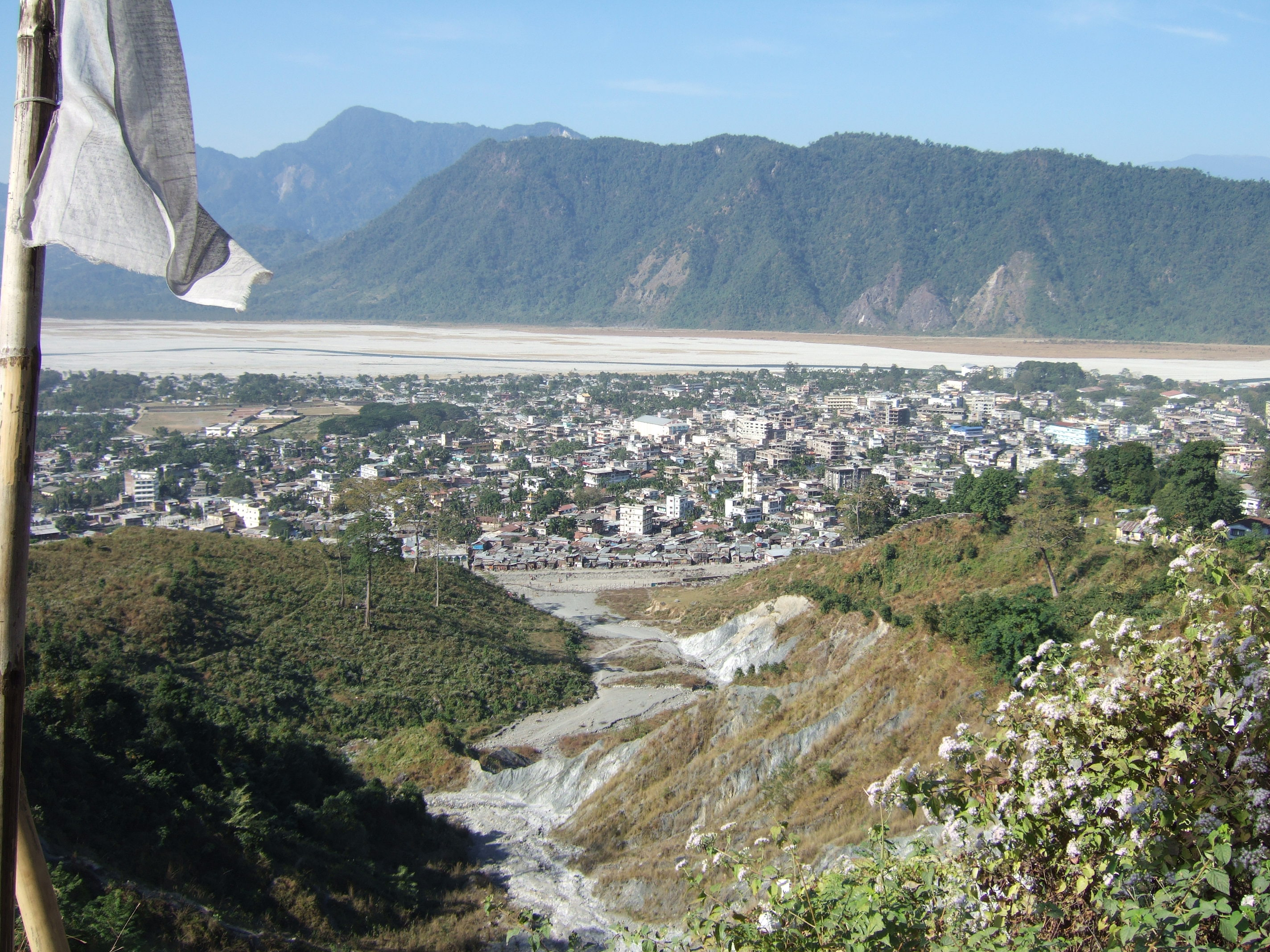
View of Phuntsholing, Chukha District

Chukha District (Dzongkha: ཆུ་ཁ་རྫོང་ཁག།; Wylie: Chu-kha rdzong-khag; officially spelled "Chhukha") is one of the 20 dzongkhag (districts) comprising Bhutan. The headquarters is the town of Mebisa, former called Chukha and the major town is Phuentsholing, the second largest city in Bhutan and its commercial capital. According to the 2017 census of Bhutan, Chhukha has a population of 68,966 people, making it the second most populous district after Thimphu, and the third most densely populated district (population density of 36.7 people per square kilometre) after Thimphu and Samtse districts.

== Languages ==
In Chukha, the main native languages are Dzongkha, the national language, and Nepali, spoken by the Lhotshampa in the south. The Bhutanese Lhokpu language, spoken by the Lhop minority, is also present in the southwest along the border with Samtse District.

== Administrative divisions ==
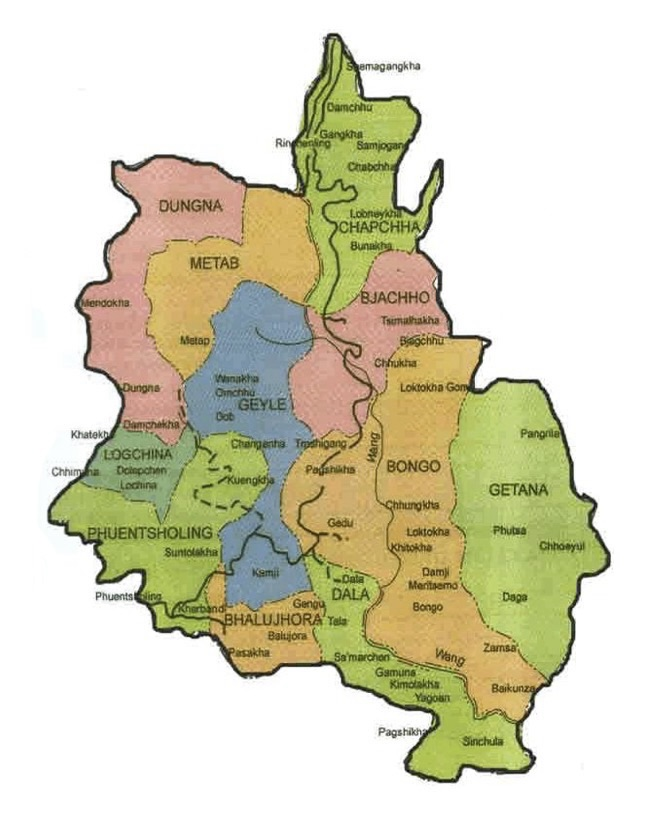
Map of Chukha Gewogs

Chukha District is divided into eleven village blocks (or gewogs):

- Bjacho Gewog
- Bongo Gewog
- Chapcha Gewog
- Dala Gewog
- Dungna Gewog
- Geling Gewog
- Getena Gewog
- Logchina Gewog
- Metakha Gewog
- Phuentsholing Gewog
- Sampheling Gewog

== Environment ==
Chukha Dzongkhag covers 1,880 sq. km, but unlike most other districts, Chukha, along with Samtse, contain no protected areas of Bhutan. Although much of southern Bhutan contained protected areas in the 1960s, park-level environmental protection became untenable.

== Infrastructure ==
Chukha contains Bhutan's oldest hydropower plant, Chukha hydel (completed in 1986–88), and Tala Hydroelectricity Project, the country's largest power plant.

== Tourism ==
Dokhachu Goenpa

Dokhachu Goenpa, also known as Ekajati Lhakhang, is a Buddhist temple located in Chapcha, Bhutan. It was founded in 1650 by Choeje Thinley Jamtsho. The Monastery houses a revered statue of the wish-granting goddess Ekajati, or Aum Kangchim, believed to fulfill devotees' wishes.

Tumdra Aminey

Tumdra Ami Ney is a chief abode of wish-granting goddess Lhamo Ekajati located in Darla Gewog under Chhukha Dzongkhag in Bhutan. The Ney was discovered by Thangthong Gyalpo, and later Terton Drukdra Dorji meditated and discovered “Ter” of Aum Kangchim Statue from the Ney in the eighteenth century.

Zangdo Pelri Lhakhang

Zangdo Pelri Lhakhang in Phuentsholing is a small monastery representing the “celestial abode of Guru Rimpoche” located in the heart of the Phuentsholing town. Dasho Aku Tongmi built the Temple in the 1900s.

Kharbandi Monastery

Kharbandi Monastery, also known as Rinchending Goemba, is a monastery in Phuntsholing built by the Royal Grandmother, Ashi Phuntsho Choden in 1967. The Rinchending monastery has become a tourist attraction among Indian tourists in Phuentsholing due to its historical significance and views of the plains of Jaigaon, West Bengal and the Phuentsholing town.

== Climate ==
Climate data for Dungna, Chukha District, elevation 1,600 m (5,200 ft), (1996–2017 normals)
Month	Jan	Feb	Mar	Apr	May	Jun	Jul	Aug	Sep	Oct	Nov	Dec	Year
Mean daily maximum °C (°F)	13.8 (56.8)	15.2 (59.4)	18.2 (64.8)	20.5 (68.9)	22.5 (72.5)	24.1 (75.4)	24.4 (75.9)	24.0 (75.2)	23.3 (73.9)	22.1 (71.8)	19.2 (66.6)	15.7 (60.3)	20.3 (68.5)
Daily mean °C (°F)	9.7 (49.5)	11.1 (52.0)	14.0 (57.2)	16.2 (61.2)	18.2 (64.8)	19.9 (67.8)	20.3 (68.5)	19.8 (67.6)	19.1 (66.4)	17.6 (63.7)	14.5 (58.1)	11.2 (52.2)	16.0 (60.8)
Mean daily minimum °C (°F)	5.5 (41.9)	6.9 (44.4)	9.8 (49.6)	11.9 (53.4)	13.8 (56.8)	15.7 (60.3)	16.2 (61.2)	15.5 (59.9)	14.8 (58.6)	13.0 (55.4)	9.8 (49.6)	6.7 (44.1)	11.6 (52.9)
Average rainfall mm (inches)	17.6 (0.69)	29.4 (1.16)	71.3 (2.81)	127.7 (5.03)	161.3 (6.35)	234.6 (9.24)	353.2 (13.91)	280.9 (11.06)	172.6 (6.80)	94.5 (3.72)	5.9 (0.23)	6.7 (0.26)	1,555.7 (61.26)
Average relative humidity (%)	67.8	70.8	71.4	73.1	75.0	82.8	85.7	84.7	81.6	75.9	68.7	68.3	75.5
Source: National Center for Hydrology and Meteorology

Climate data for Phuntsholing, Chukha District, elevation 220 m (720 ft), (1996–2017 normals)
Month	Jan	Feb	Mar	Apr	May	Jun	Jul	Aug	Sep	Oct	Nov	Dec	Year
Record high °C (°F)	33.0 (91.4)	33.8 (92.8)	38.0 (100.4)	37.0 (98.6)	39.0 (102.2)	38.0 (100.4)	39.0 (102.2)	40.0 (104.0)	39.0 (102.2)	38.0 (100.4)	36.9 (98.4)	35.0 (95.0)	40.0 (104.0)
Mean daily maximum °C (°F)	23.9 (75.0)	26.6 (79.9)	29.8 (85.6)	31.1 (88.0)	32.3 (90.1)	32.3 (90.1)	31.9 (89.4)	32.3 (90.1)	31.7 (89.1)	31.2 (88.2)	28.7 (83.7)	25.4 (77.7)	29.8 (85.6)
Daily mean °C (°F)	18.6 (65.5)	21.5 (70.7)	24.2 (75.6)	25.6 (78.1)	27.0 (80.6)	27.7 (81.9)	27.8 (82.0)	28.1 (82.6)	27.4 (81.3)	26.2 (79.2)	23.3 (73.9)	20.2 (68.4)	24.8 (76.6)
Mean daily minimum °C (°F)	13.4 (56.1)	16.3 (61.3)	18.5 (65.3)	20.1 (68.2)	21.7 (71.1)	23.1 (73.6)	23.7 (74.7)	23.8 (74.8)	23.1 (73.6)	21.1 (70.0)	17.9 (64.2)	15.0 (59.0)	19.8 (67.7)
Record low °C (°F)	5.0 (41.0)	9.0 (48.2)	12.0 (53.6)	14.3 (57.7)	15.1 (59.2)	16.0 (60.8)	17.0 (62.6)	19.0 (66.2)	17.0 (62.6)	14.0 (57.2)	10.0 (50.0)	7.5 (45.5)	5.0 (41.0)
Average rainfall mm (inches)	17.3 (0.68)	31.1 (1.22)	80.2 (3.16)	216.5 (8.52)	380.3 (14.97)	807.2 (31.78)	962.6 (37.90)	779.1 (30.67)	492.6 (19.39)	162.9 (6.41)	13.2 (0.52)	10.4 (0.41)	3,953.4 (155.63)
Average relative humidity (%)	72.4	71.3	70.0	74.7	80.1	83.8	88.5	87.1	84.4	75.6	70.7	72.4	77.6
Source: National Center for Hydrology and Meteorology

== See also ==
- Districts of Bhutan
- Phuentsholing
- Dungna
- Paro Province
- Daga Province
