= Samtse Gewog =

Samtse Gewog བསམ་རྩེ་
- Gewogs
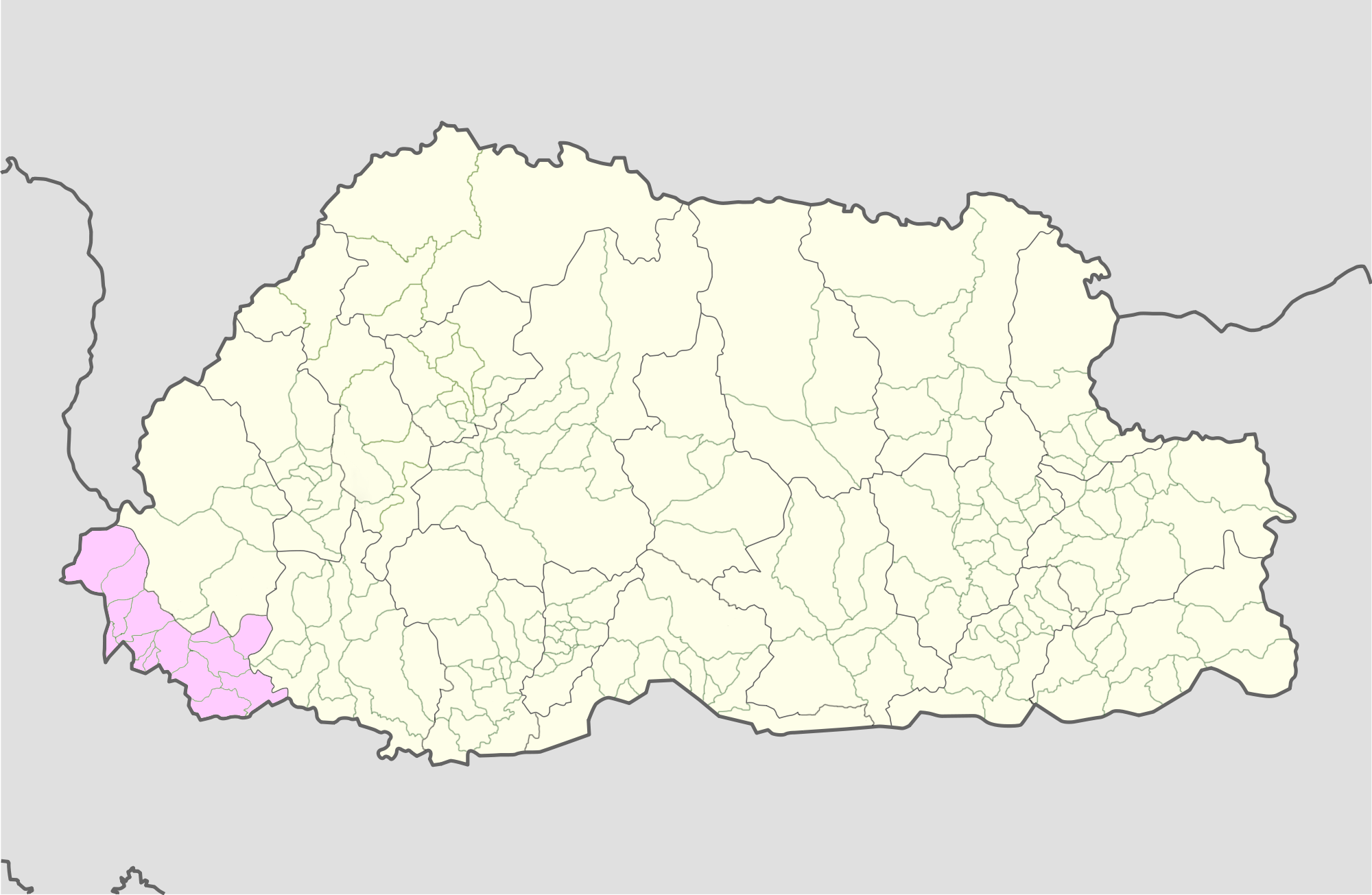
- Country: Bhutan
- District: Samtse District
- Time zone: UTC+6 (BTT)

Samtse Gewog (Dzongkha: བསམ་རྩེ་) is a gewog (village block) of Samtse District, Bhutan.

The village of Chengmari is located within the district.
