= Namgaychhoeling Gewog =

Namgaychhoeling Gewog རྣམ་རྒྱས་ཆོས་གླིང་
- Gewogs
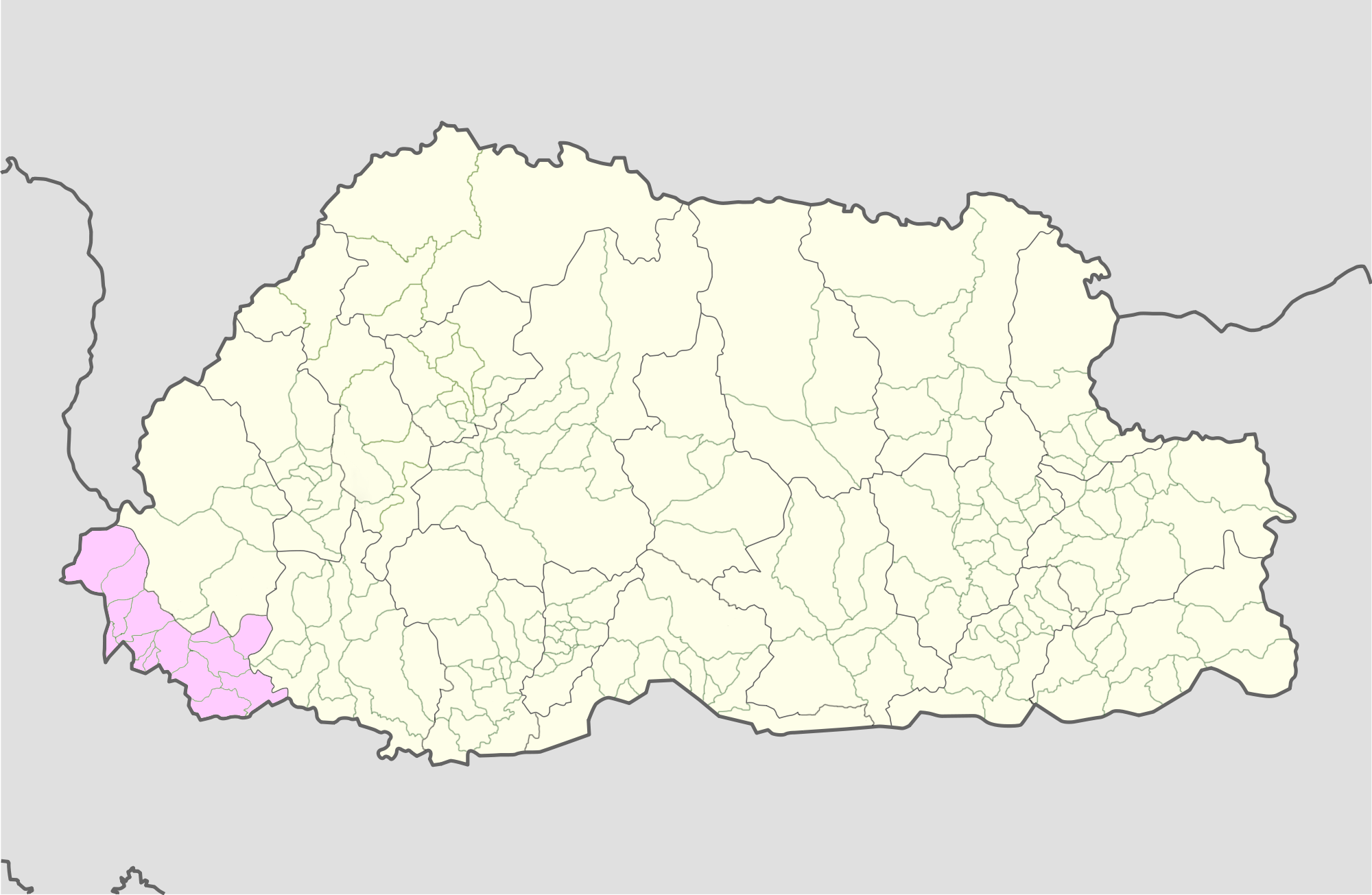
- Country: Bhutan
- District: Samtse District
- Time zone: UTC+6 (BTT)

Namgaychhoeling Gewog (Dzongkha: རྣམ་རྒྱས་ཆོས་གླིང་), formerly Lehereni Gewog, is a gewog (village block) of Samtse District, Bhutan. Namgaychhoeling Gewog comprises part of Tashicholing Dungkhag (sub-district), together with Tendu, Pemaling, Norgaygang, and Tashicholing Gewogs.
