= Dungna =

- Location in Bhutan
- Coordinates: 27°2′N 89°24′E
- Country: Bhutan
- District: Chukha District
- Time zone: UTC+6 (BTT)

Dungna is a town in Chukha District in southwestern Bhutan.
