= Tashicholing Gewog =

Tashicholing Gewog བཀྲིས་ཙོས་གླིང་ Sipsu Gewog
- Gewog
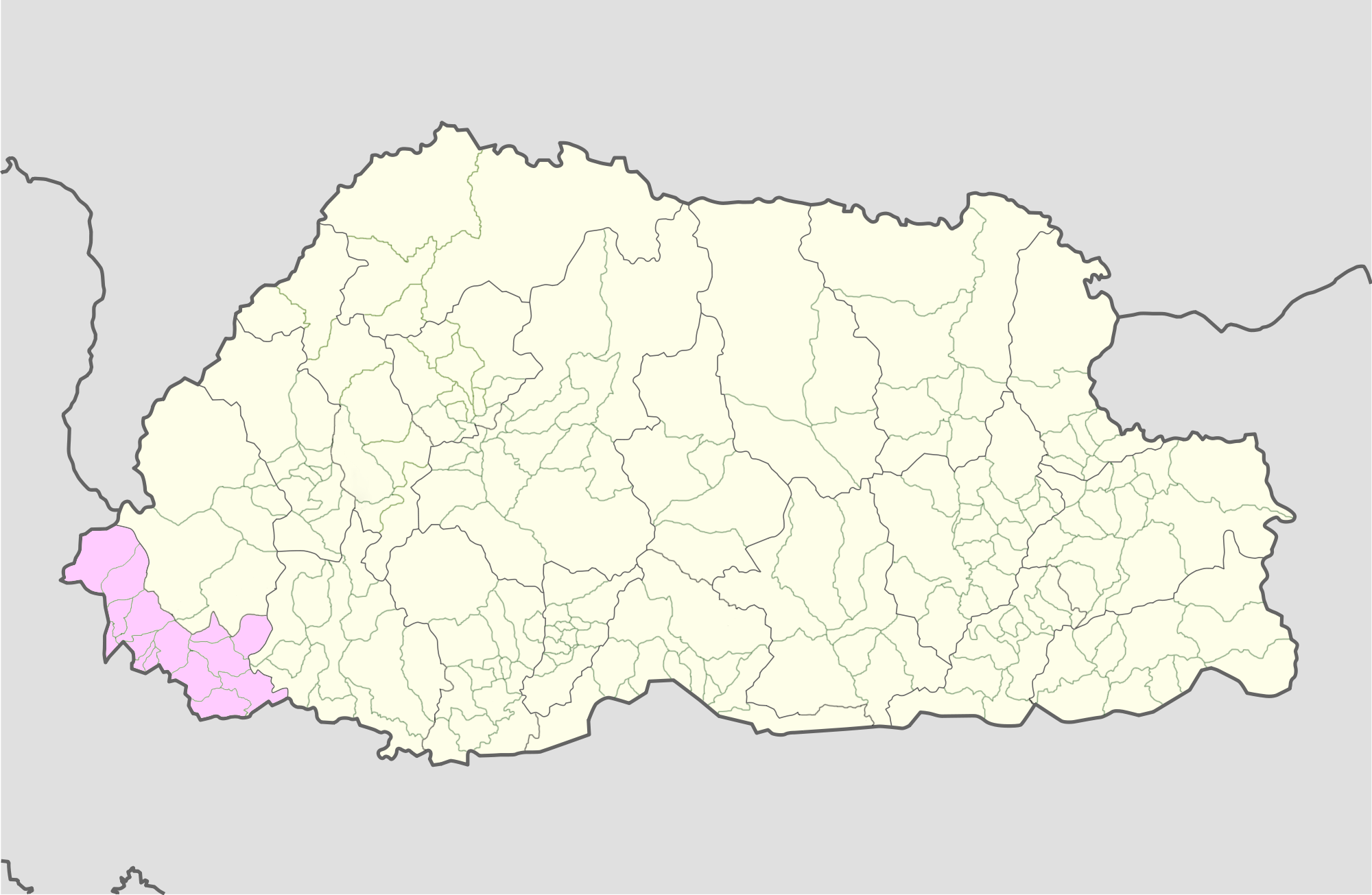
- Sipsu in the Samtse District of Bhutan
- Coordinates: 27°00′27″N 88°52′48″E
- Country: Bhutan
- District: Samtse District

Area
  - Total: 27.67 km^{2} (10.68 sq mi)

Population (2012)
  - Total: 4,087
  - Density: 147.7/km^{2} (382.6/sq mi)
- Time zone: UTC+6 (BTT)

Tashicholing (Note: Alternative spellings: Tashichholing and Tashichhoeling.) (Dzongkha: བཀྲིས་ཙོས་གླིང་, romanized: bkris tsos gling) or Sipsu Gewog (Note: Alternative spellings: Sibsu, Sibsoo and Sibchoo.) is a gewog (village block) of the Samtse District, Bhutan.

== Geography ==
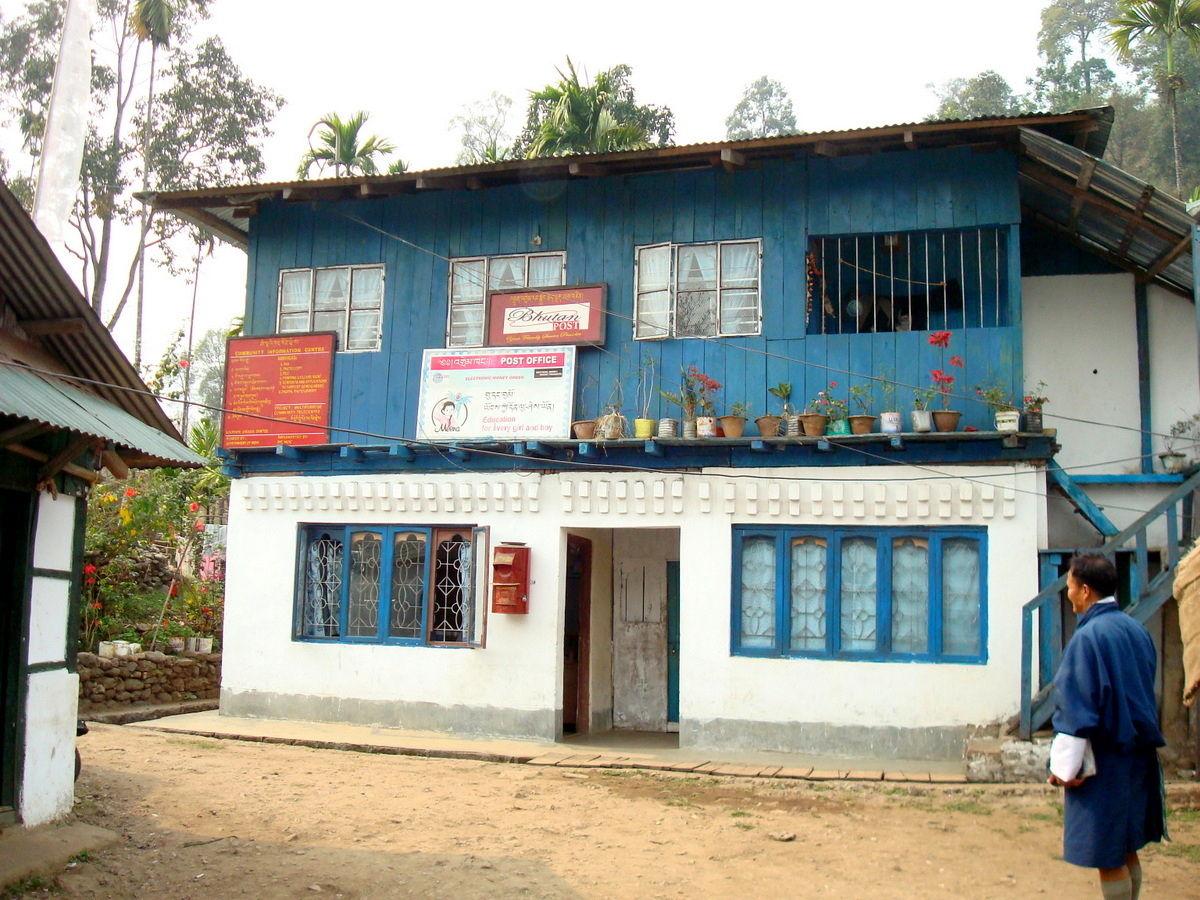
Post office in the Sipsu town

Tashicholing Gewog (Sipsu Gewog)

The gewog is to the south of Pemaling gewog and southwest of Namgaychhoeling gewog. It is bordered by India's West Bengal state in the west and the south (Kalimpong and Jalpaiguri districts). The Dichu (or Jaldhaka) River forms the western border of the gewog, and the rivers Sipsu Jhora and Sati Khola flow through it before joining Dichu at the southwestern corner.

The Tashichholing Gewog occupies an area of 27.67 square kilometres (10.68 sq mi). It has 11 villages in 4 chiwogs. In 2012, it had a population of 4,087.

== History ==
The village of Sipsu (also spelt Sibsu, Sibsoo and Sipchoo) had some encounters in history, as it appears to have been the seat of administration of the surrounding Dichu basin. In the 19th century, it was governed by deputy Dzongpön, perhaps under the control of a main Dzongpön at Dalingkot to the west. The official spent the winter months at Sipsu and the summer months at Dzongsa Dzong, (Note: Alternative spellings: Jongtsa, Jonksa, Dzongsar and Jumsatar. It is currently in the Dawathang_Kuengaling chiwog in the Tendu Gewog.) which was six miles to the north. Sipsu was bordered in the east by Sangbay, which also had a Dzongpön. The two districts were separated by the Tulela ridge.

In 1863, the Eden Mission of British India, sent to negotiate an agreement with Bhutan regarding border relations, passed through Sipsu. The Bhutanese were reluctant to receive Eden and placed obstacles in his path. The porters hired by Eden in Darjeeling came as far as Sipsu, where they deserted him for fear of the Bhutanese. Eden was given the impression that he would be able to obtain new porters at Sipsu, but the village was too small to offer any. The Deputy Dzongpön of Sipsu told Eden that he had no orders to allow him entry into Bhutan, and could offer no assistance. Undeterred, Eden left most of his entourage and supplies at Sipsu, and proceeded with a smaller contingent via Tule La and Sangbay, towards Ha. The Mission eventually reached the Bhutanese capital Punakha, but it was not successful, and led to further frictions and the Anglo-Bhutan War of 1864.

The war did not see any action at Sipsu, but Dalingkot faced an attack by British troops, and quickly fell, while there was a serious battle at Samtse. At the end of the war, the Treaty of Sinchula (1865) was signed, in which unspecified "hill territory" of Dalingkot was ceded to the British as were all the duars to the south in return for an annual payment. In 1866–1867 an Anglo-Bhutanese commission demarcated the borders, and set the Dichu and Nichu (Note: Nichu is a tributary of Dichu, flowing east from the Sikkim–Bhutan border ridge. It joins Dichu near Dzongsa, where also Bindu Khola joins it from the east.) rivers as the boundary of the Dalingkot area, making Sipsu a border district of Bhutan.

== Bibliography ==
- Phuntsho, Karma (2013), The History of Bhutan, Random House India, pp. 405–, ISBN 978-81-8400-411-3
- Rennie, Surgeon (1866), Bhotan and the Dooar War, John Murray – via archive.org
