= Pemaling Gewog =

Pemaling Gewog པདྨ་གླིང་ Biru Gewog
- Gewogs
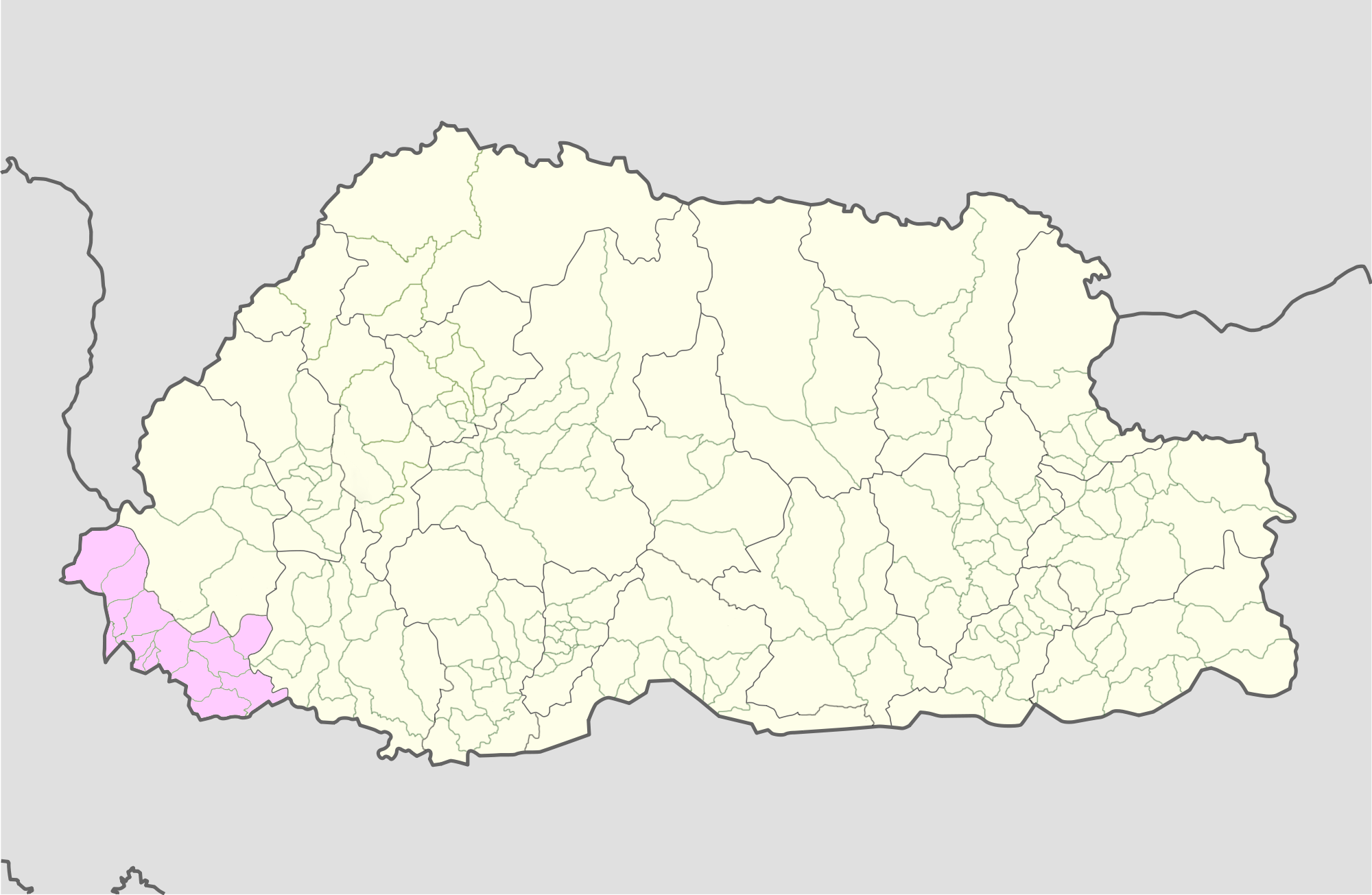
- Country: Bhutan
- District: Samtse District

Area
  - Total: 49.04 km^{2} (18.93 sq mi)
- Time zone: UTC+6 (BTT)

Pemaling Gewog (Dzongkha: པདྨ་གླིང་) is a gewog (village block) of Samtse District, Bhutan. The gewog has an area of 49.04 square kilometres and contains 15 chewogs with 46 villages and 448 households. Pemaling Gewog comprises part of Tashicholing Dungkhag (sub-district), together with Tendu, Namgaychhoeling, Norgaygang, and Tashicholing Gewogs.
