= Sangngagchhoeling Gewog =

Sangngagchhoeling Gewog གསང་སྔགས་ཆོས་གླིང་
- Gewog
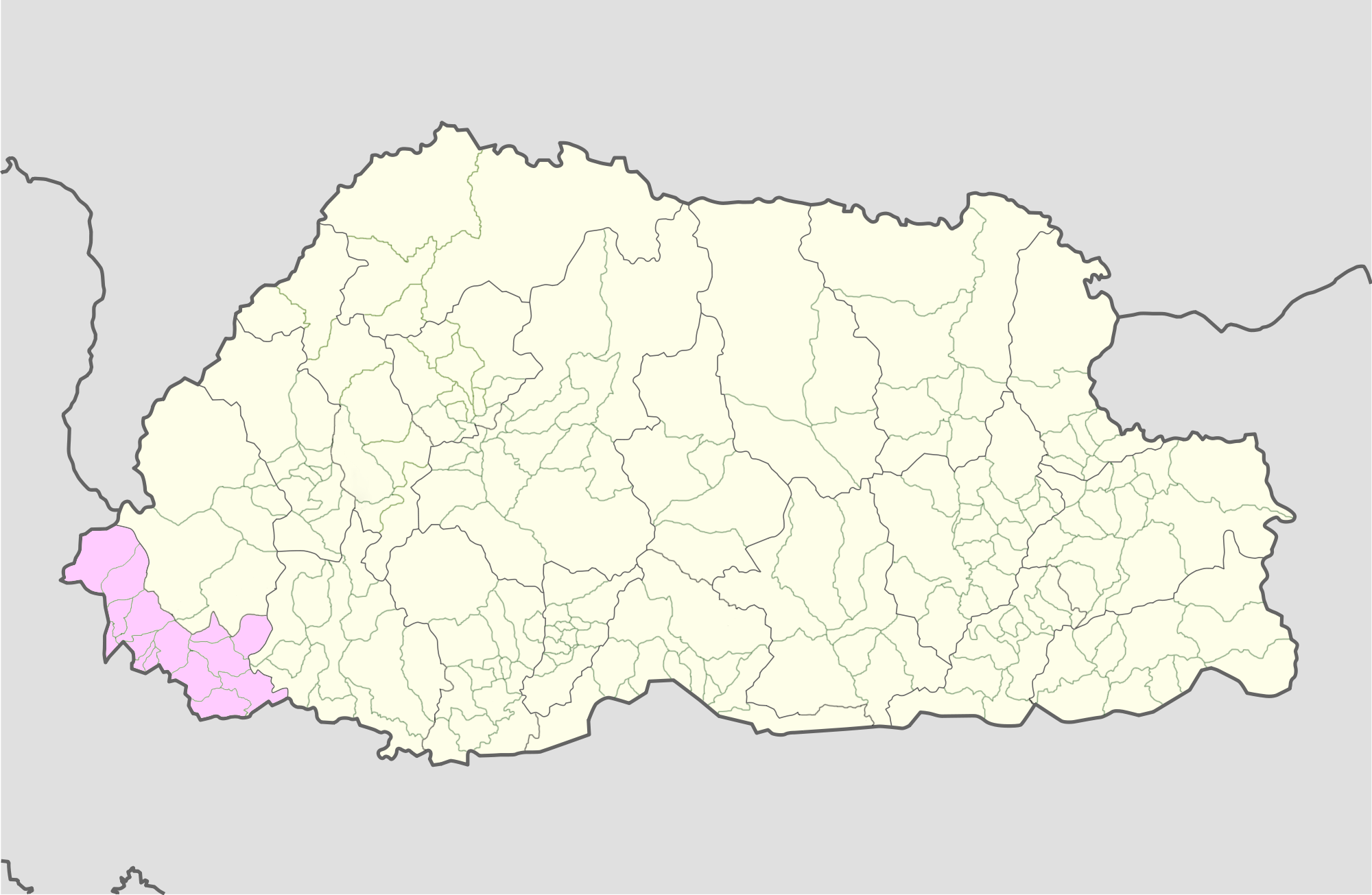
- Country: Bhutan
- District: Samtse District
- Time zone: UTC+6 (BTT)

Sangngagchhoeling Gewog (Dzongkha: གསང་སྔགས་ཆོས་གླིང་) is a gewog (village block) in Samtse District, Bhutan.
