= Tendu Gewog =

Tendu བསྟང་འབྲུག་ Tendruk
- Gewogs
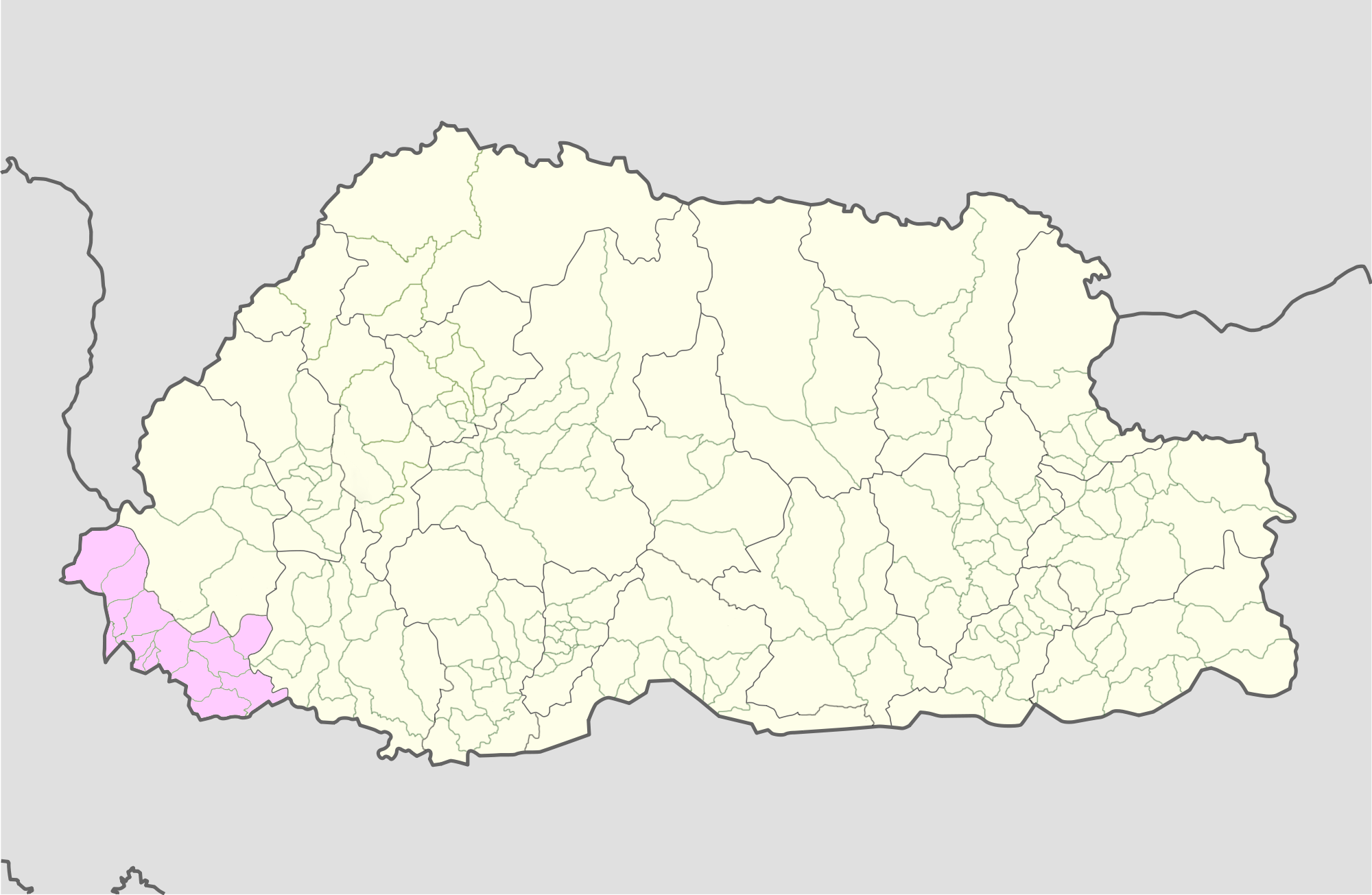
- Tendu in the Samtse District of Bhutan
- Coordinates: 27°07′20″N 88°52′23″E
- Country: Bhutan
- District: Samtse District

Area
  - Total: 132.52 km^{2} (51.17 sq mi)

Population (2012)
  - Total: 6,175
- Time zone: UTC+6 (BTT)

Tendu or Tendruk Gewog (Dzongkha: བསྟང་འབྲུག་, romanized: bstang 'brug) is a gewog (village block) of Samtse District, Bhutan. Tendruk Gewog comprises part of Tashicholing Dungkhag (sub-district), together with Bara, Biru, Lehereni, and Sipsu Gewogs.

Tendruk Gewog occupies an area of 132.52 square kilometres (51.17 sq mi). It has 21 villages in 5 chiwogs. In 2012, it had a population of 6,175.

== Tendrukthang ==
Tendrukthang/Tendu (Nepali: Tendu Tar) is a village in Tendu Gewog on a ridge near the confluence of the Bindu River with the Dichu (or Jaldhaka) River. The Indo-Bhutan border meets the Dichu near this point, with the west bank of Dichu being in India (Kalimpong district) and the east bank being in Bhutan. Thus, part of the Tendruk gewog lies on the border with India. A little below the confluence is the Bindu Dam over Dichu, which is said to be the second-oldest dam in the Indian subcontinent. There is a border crossing to India over the dam.
