= Denchukha Gewog =

- Gewog
- Interactive map of Denchukha Gewog
- Country: Bhutan
- District: Samtse District
- Sub-district: Dorokha Dungkhag
- Time zone: UTC+6 (BTT)

Denchukha Gewog, also Duenchukha, is a gewog (village block) of Samtse District, Bhutan.

Denchukha Gewog is part of Dorokha Dungkhag (sub-district), together with Dorokha and Dungtoe Gewogs. The former Myona gewog was dissolved and areas abutting Haa were merged with Haa dzongkhag and rest of the areas were merged into Denchukha gewog. Denchukha Gewong is connected with roads and electricity.

== Geography ==
Denchukha is rich in biodiversity. Denchukha is almost five hours drive from Samtse.

The Amo Chhu river makes it extremely difficult for motor vehicles to cross. During winter a temporary suspension bridge is available, however few vehicles dare to cross it. During summer, no vehicles cross the river. Few vehicles are on the other side. The ongoing Amo Chhu bridge construction that was intended to link the gewog with Dorokha (sub-district) collapsed in July 2016 leading to many deaths.

== Education ==
Denchukha has a lower secondary school called Denchukha Lower Secondary School. Community schools operate in the villages under Denchkha Gewog. NFE (Non-formal Education) centers are available to teach those not of school age, such as elderly farmers who did not go to school.
