= Getena Gewog =

Getena Gewog གད་སྟག་ན་
- Gewogs
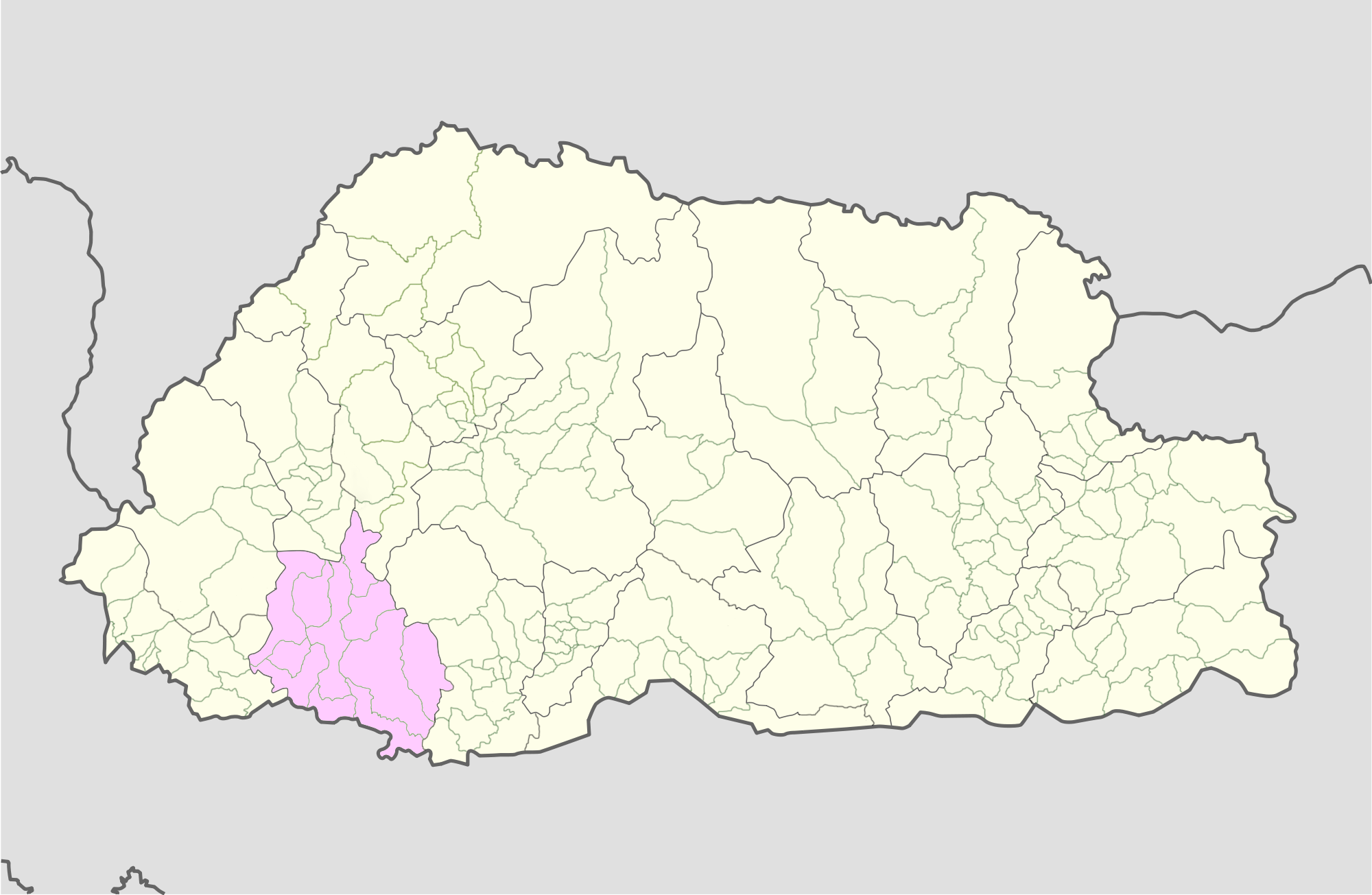
- Location within Chukha District
- Coordinates: 26°56′07″N 89°44′16″E
- Country: Bhutan
- District: Chukha District

Area
  - Total: 83 sq mi (214 km^{2})
- Time zone: UTC+6 (BTT)

Getena Gewog (Dzongkha: གད་སྟག་ན,Getana Gewog་) is a gewog (village block) of Chukha District, Bhutan. The 214-km² gewog contains 7 villages and 118 households.
