= Tading Gewog =

Tading Gewog རྟ་སྡིང་
- Gewogs
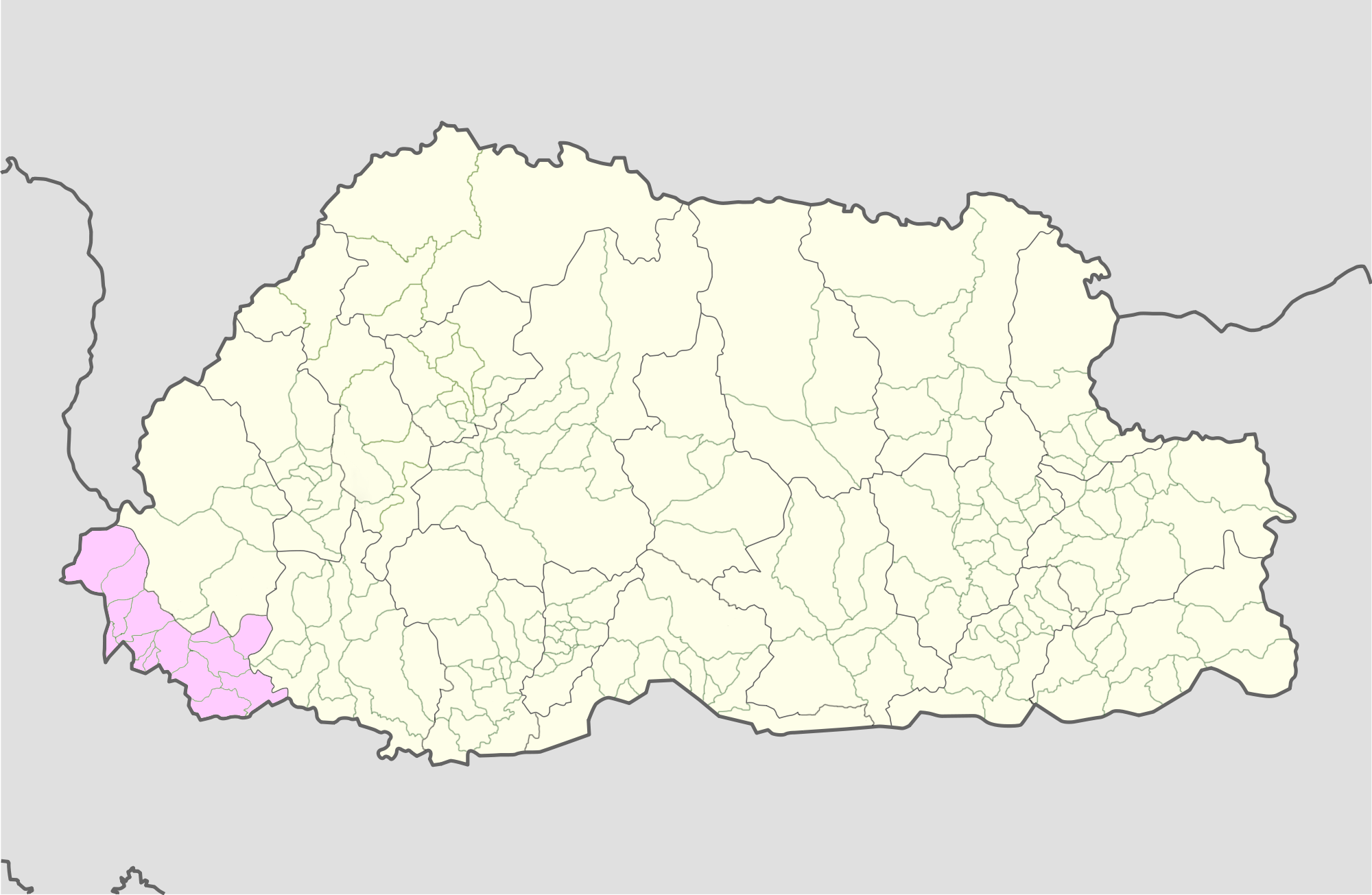
- Coordinates: 26°52′49″N 89°19′21″E
- Country: Bhutan
- District: Samtse District
- Time zone: UTC+6 (BTT)

Tading Gewog (Dzongkha: རྟ་སྡིང་) is a gewog (village block) of Samtse District, Bhutan.

Tading gewog ( Dzongkha: རྟ་ལྡིང་ རྒེད་འོག) is located to the east of Samtse Dzongkhag and lies near to Phuentsholing Dungkhag covering about 108.27 square kilometers of area. It is bordered by Dophuchen and Denchukha gewog to the north and chukha Dzongkhag to the east.
