= Geling Gewog =

Geling Gewog དགེ་གླིང་
- Gewogs
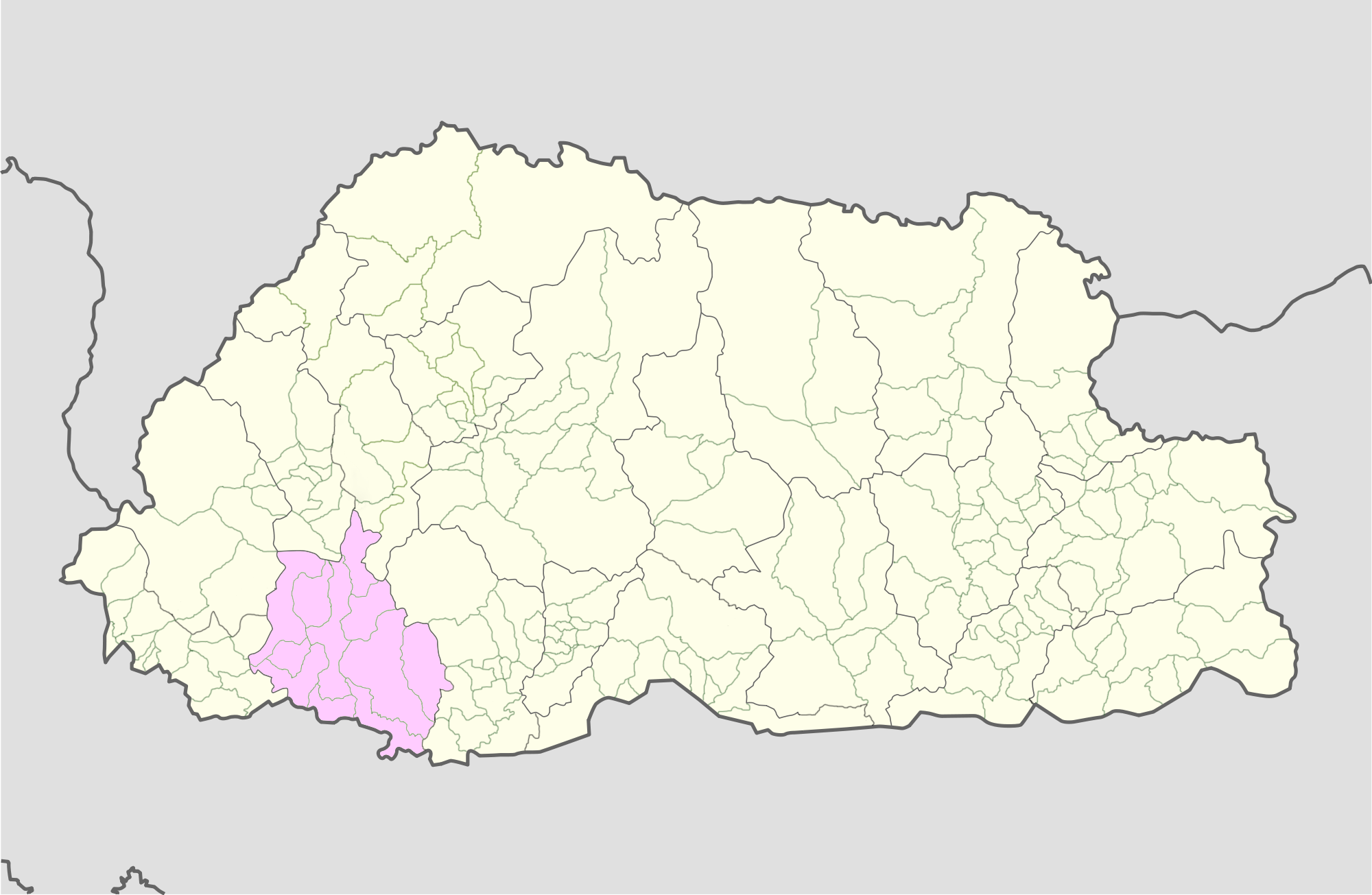
- Location within Chukha District
- Coordinates: 27°00′54″N 89°29′03″E
- Country: Bhutan
- District: Chukha District

Area
  - Total: 95 sq mi (247 km^{2})
- Time zone: UTC+6 (BTT)

Geling Gewog (Dzongkha: དགེ་གླིང་) is a gewog (village block) of Chukha District, Bhutan. The 247-km² gewog contains 11 villages.
