= Phuentshogpelri Gewog =

Phuentshogpelri Gewog ཕུན་ཚོགས་དབལ་རི་
- Gewog
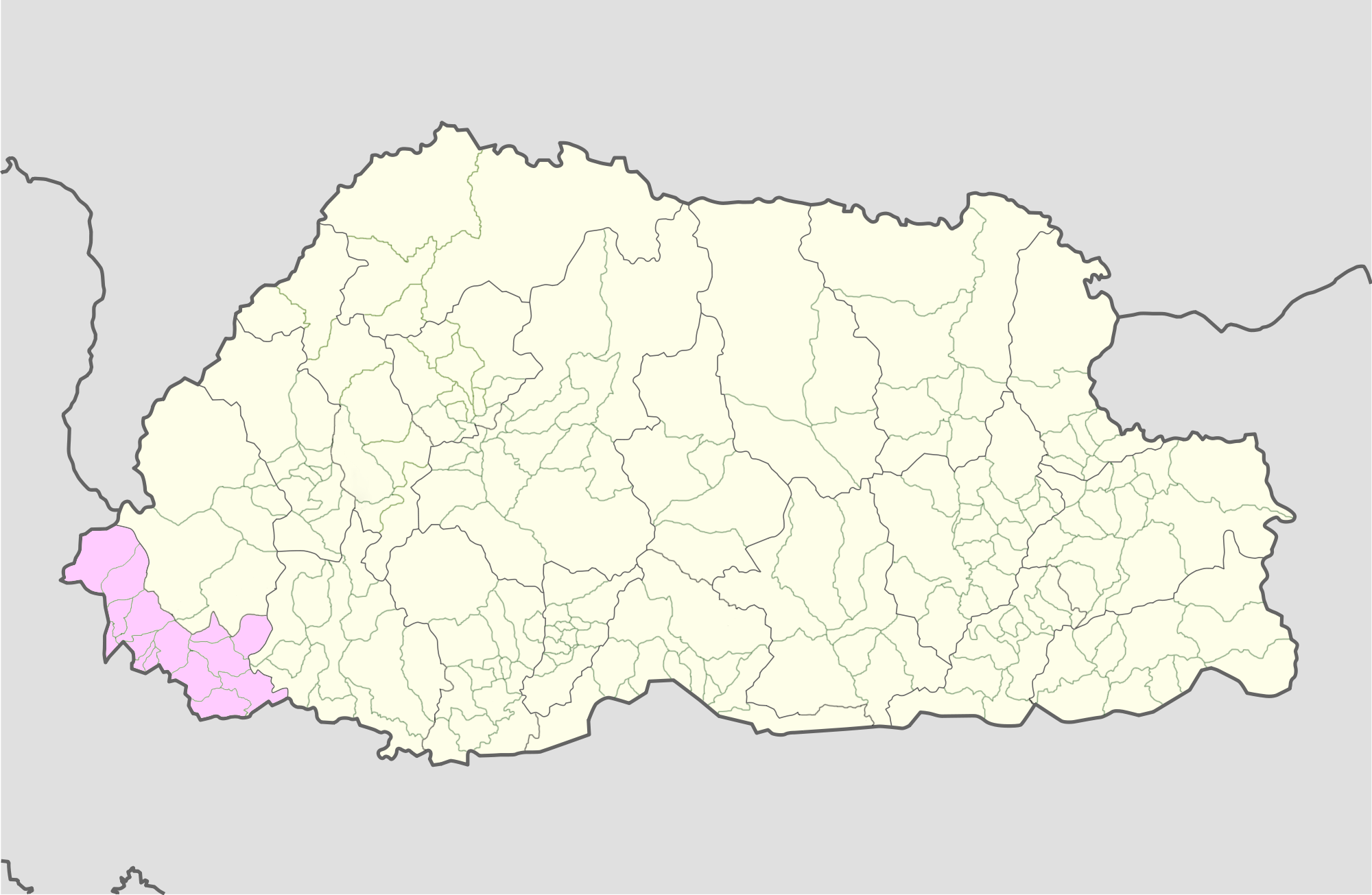
- Country: Bhutan
- District: Samtse District
- Time zone: UTC+6 (BTT)

Phuentshogpelri Gewog (Dzongkha: ཕུན་ཚོགས་དབལ་རི་) is a gewog (village block) of Samtse District, Bhutan.
