= Dungtoe Gewog =

Dungtoe Gewog གདུང་སྟོད་
- Gewogs
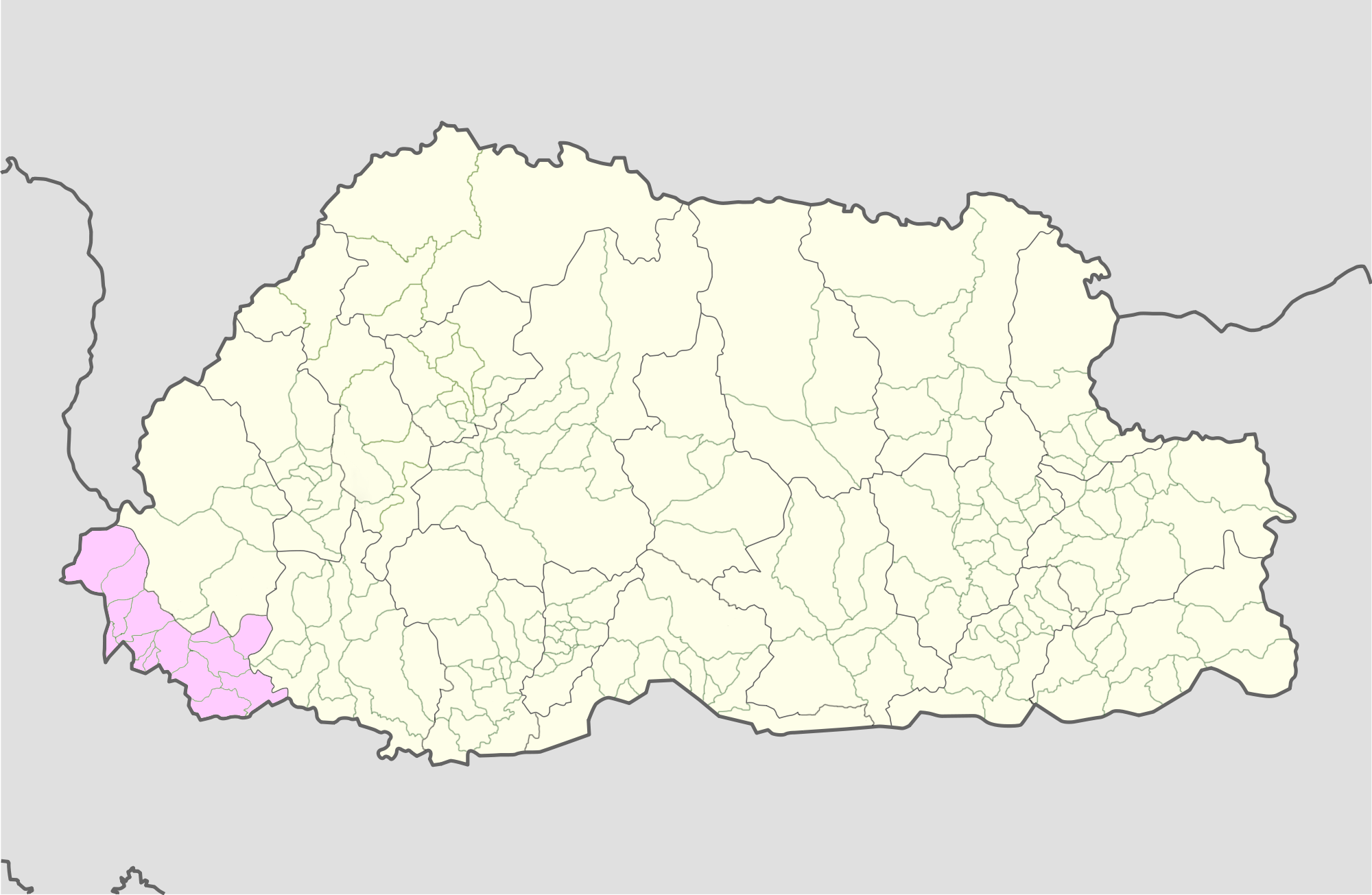
- Country: Bhutan
- District: Samtse District
- Time zone: UTC+6 (BTT)

Dungtoe Gewog (Dzongkha: གདུང་སྟོད་) is a gewog (village block) of Samtse District, Bhutan. Dungtoe Gewog is part of Dorokha Dungkhag (sub-district), together with Dorokha and Denchukha Gewogs.
