= Bongo Gewog =

Bongo Gewog སྦོང་སྒོར་
- Gewogs
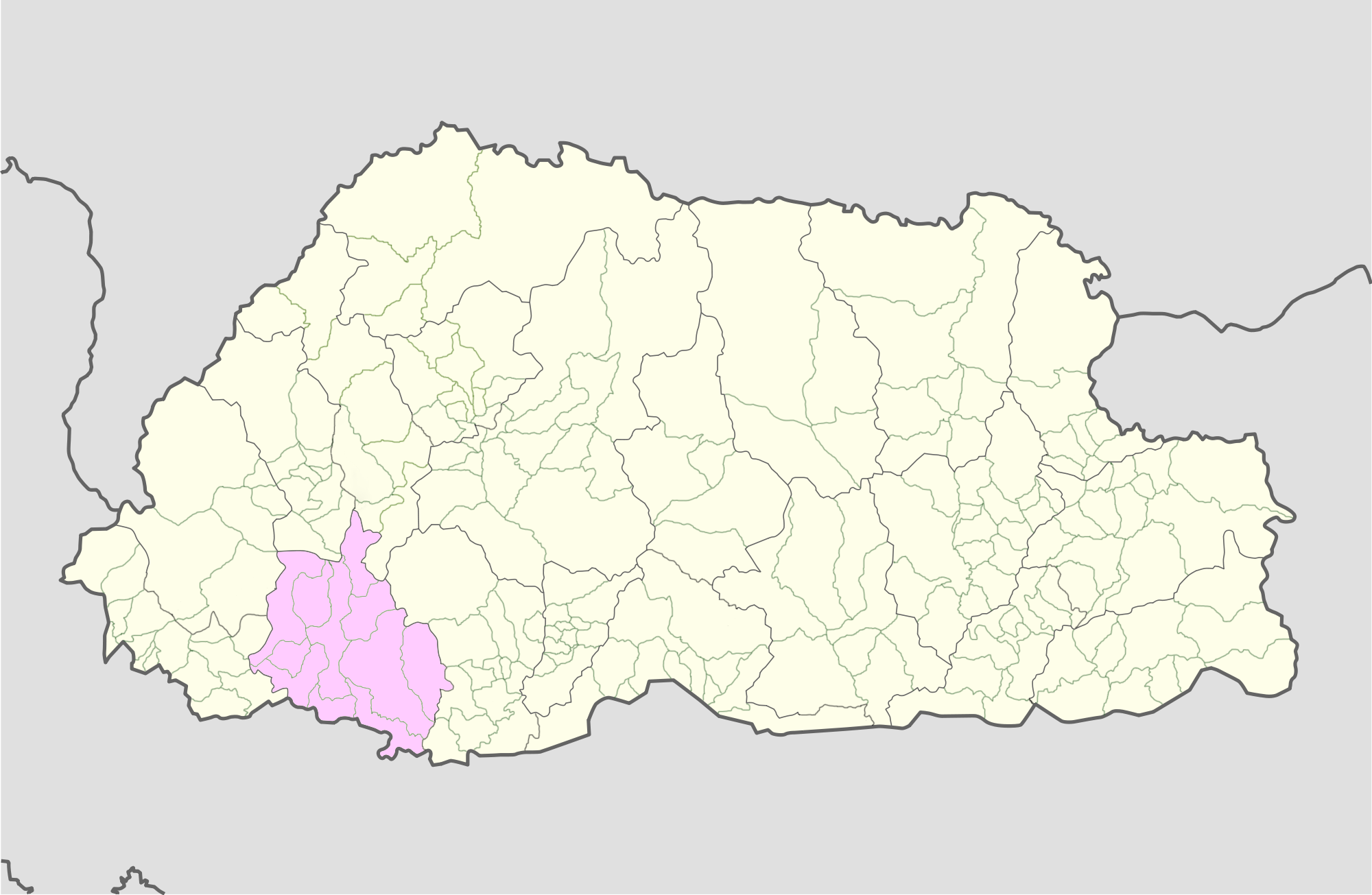
- Location within Chukha District
- Coordinates: 26°55′13″N 89°37′19″E
- Country: Bhutan
- District: Chukha District

Area
  - Total: 153 sq mi (396 km^{2})

Population (2017)
  - Total: 6,512
- Time zone: UTC+6 (BTT)

Bongo Gewog (Dzongkha: སྦོང་སྒོར་) is a gewog (village block) of Chukha District, Bhutan. The gewog is the largest in the district with an area of 396 square kilometres. It contains 15 villages, with a total population of 6,512, as of 2017.
