= Samtse College of Education =

- Samtse; Bhutan

Information
- Type: Education
- Established: 1968
- Enrolment: 350/year
- Website: http://www.sce.edu.bt/index.php

Samtse College of Education, a constituent college of the Royal University of Bhutan, is one of the two institutes in the country offering undergraduate degree programmes in education and post graduate diplomas in education. The college is in Samtse, Bhutan.

It was founded in 1968 as the Teacher Training Institute by King Jigme Dorji Wangchuck, the third king of Bhutan. It was renamed in 1983 to National Institute of Education and was changed to Samtse College of Education in 2003 when it became part of the Royal University of Bhutan.

Kaylzang Tshering became its director in 2008.
