= Samtse District =

District of Bhutan

Coordinates: 27°0′N 89°5′E

Samtse District བསམ་རྩེ་རྫོང་ཁག།
- District
- Location of Samtse district within Bhutan
- Country: Bhutan
- Headquarters: Samtse

Area
  - Total: 1,305 km^{2} (504 sq mi)

Population (2017)
  - Total: 62,590
  - Density: 47.96/km^{2} (124.2/sq mi)
- Time zone: UTC+6 (BTT)
- HDI (2019): 0.620 medium · 9th
- Website: www.samtse.gov.bt

Samtse District (Dzongkha: བསམ་རྩེ་རྫོང་ཁག།; Wylie: Bsam-rtse rdzong-khag; older spelling "Samchi") is one of the 20 dzongkhags (districts) comprising Bhutan. It comprises two subdistricts (dungkhags): Tashicholing and Dophuchen. They are further subdivided into 15 gewogs (village blocks). The Samtse district covers a total area of 1304 km^{2}. With a population of 62,590 individuals and a population density of 48 people per sq.km, Samtse is the third most populous and second most densely populated district in Bhutan.

== History and culture ==
Historically, Samtse was sparsely populated as the mountain-dwelling Bhutanese considered the low-lying district to be prone to tropical disease. During the early 20th century, the district experienced a large influx of Nepali people who were invited to the area to assist in forest-clearing. Overall, the district population has been increasing, and there have been housing shortages in Samtse as reported by Kuensel.

Samtse is also home to the Lhop (Doya) people, a little-studied ethnic group of approximately 2,500 persons. Some Bhutanese believe them to be the aboriginals of south west Bhutan. The Lhop are noted for their animistic religious beliefs, their practice of marrying cross-cousins, and their unique burial customs.

== Languages ==
The dominant language in Samtse District is Nepali, spoken by the heterogeneous Lhotshampa community, though speakers of Dzongkha, the national language, inhabit the district's eastern reaches. Samtse is also home to some of the autochthonous communities of Bhutan, pre-dating the arrival of Nepali and Dzongkha speakers. Lepcha is spoken by some 2,000 people in northeastern Samtse, and Lhokpu is spoken by some 2,500 people along the border with Chukha District.

== Economy and education ==
Samtse has an abundance of natural deposits of talc, dolomite and other resources which are exported on a regular basis. It also houses a number of industrial and manufacturing units. Cardamom, ginger, areca nut, and oranges are the predominant cash crops, although most farmers practice subsistence farming. Out of the many gewogs of Bhutan, Bara gewog has the largest cardamom growing areas. In 2010 the production is very high. 2010 prices were very high compared to past years.

Samtse is the site of one of the two campuses of the National Institute of Education, now known as Samtse College of Education, a college for teachers part of the Royal University of Bhutan system. This training Institute offers B.Ed. (for secondary as well as primary), PgDE courses, and M.Ed. in Science and Counselling.

== Geography ==
With an area of approximately 1500 sq. kilometers, Samtse District is a little more than twice the size of Singapore. It shares an international border with the Indian states of Sikkim to the west and West Bengal to the south, and internal borders with Haa and Chukha districts.

== Administrative divisions ==
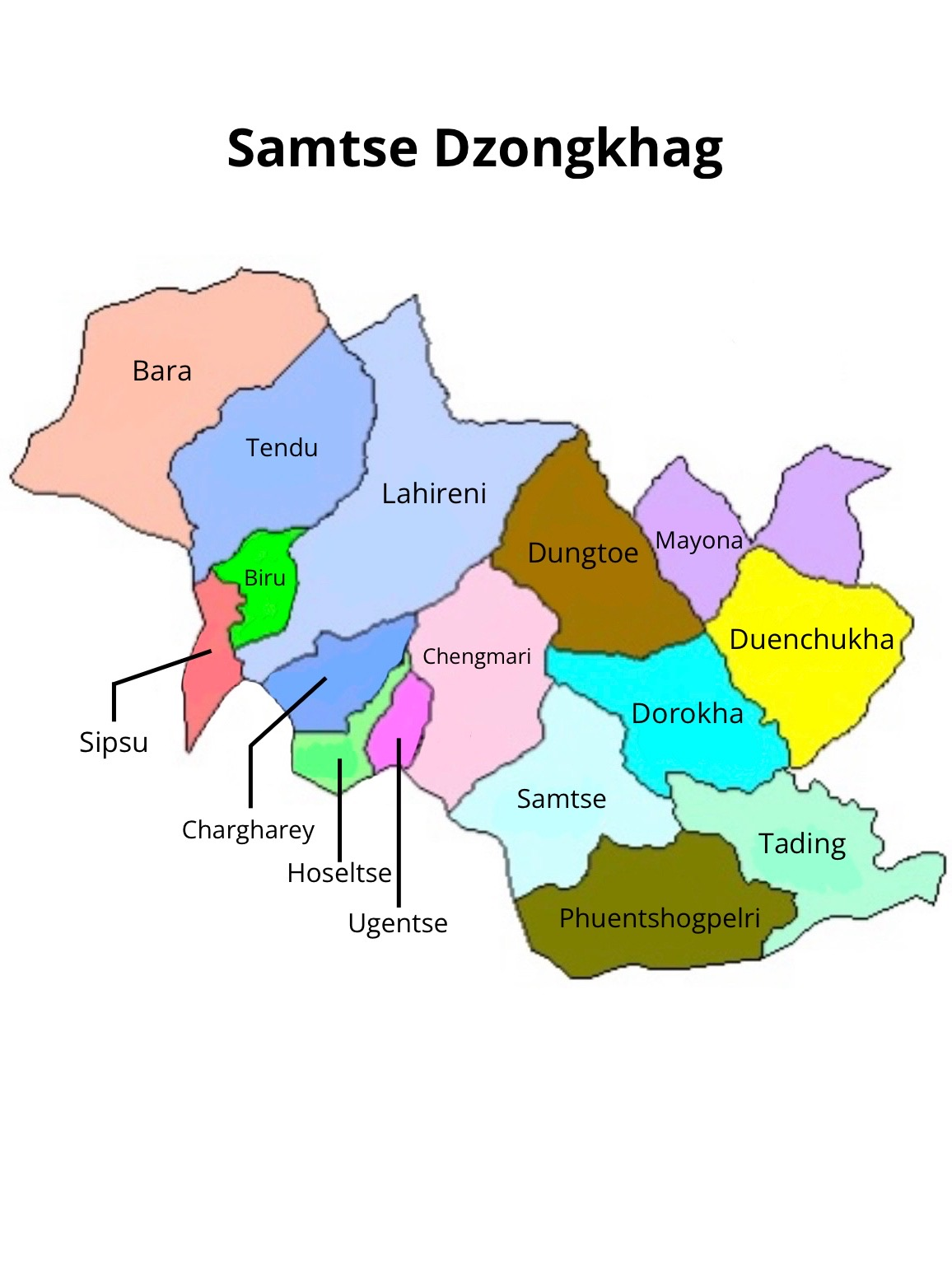
Map of Gewogs of Samtse Dzongkhag

Samtse District is divided into fifteen village blocks (or gewogs):

- Dungtoe Gewog
- Dophoogchen Gewog (also known as Dorokha Gewog)
- Duenchukha Gewog
- Namgaychhoeling Gewog (formerly Lahireni Gewog)
- Norbugang Gewog (formerly Chengmari Gewog)
- Norgaygang Gewog (formerly Bara Gewog)
- Pemaling Gewog
- Phuentshogpelri Gewog (formerly Pagli Gewog)
- Samtse Gewog
- Sangngagchhoeling Gewog (formerly Chargharey Gewog)
- Tading Gewog
- Tashicholing Gewog (also known as Sipsu Gewog, has jurisdiction over Biru Gewog)
- Tendu Gewog
- Ugentse Gewog (also spelled Ugyemtse)
- Yoeseltse Gewog (also spelled Hoseltse)

Unlike most other districts, Samtse, along with Chukha, contain no protected areas of Bhutan. Although much of southern Bhutan contained protected areas in the 1960s, park-level environmental protection became untenable.

== Climate ==
Climate data for Samtse (Sibsu), elevation 550 m (1,800 ft), (1996–2017 normals)
Month	Jan	Feb	Mar	Apr	May	Jun	Jul	Aug	Sep	Oct	Nov	Dec	Year
Record high °C (°F)	30.0 (86.0)	32.0 (89.6)	32.0 (89.6)	34.0 (93.2)	34.0 (93.2)	34.0 (93.2)	34.5 (94.1)	34.5 (94.1)	34.0 (93.2)	34.5 (94.1)	32.0 (89.6)	30.2 (86.4)	34.5 (94.1)
Mean daily maximum °C (°F)	21.2 (70.2)	23.5 (74.3)	26.6 (79.9)	28.1 (82.6)	28.8 (83.8)	29.0 (84.2)	28.6 (83.5)	29.2 (84.6)	29.2 (84.6)	28.6 (83.5)	26.0 (78.8)	23.3 (73.9)	26.8 (80.3)
Daily mean °C (°F)	17.1 (62.8)	19.4 (66.9)	22.5 (72.5)	24.3 (75.7)	25.3 (77.5)	26.2 (79.2)	26.2 (79.2)	26.6 (79.9)	26.4 (79.5)	24.9 (76.8)	21.9 (71.4)	19.0 (66.2)	23.3 (74.0)
Mean daily minimum °C (°F)	13.0 (55.4)	15.2 (59.4)	18.3 (64.9)	20.5 (68.9)	21.8 (71.2)	23.3 (73.9)	23.7 (74.7)	24.0 (75.2)	23.6 (74.5)	21.2 (70.2)	17.7 (63.9)	14.7 (58.5)	19.7 (67.6)
Record low °C (°F)	6.0 (42.8)	10.0 (50.0)	11.0 (51.8)	15.0 (59.0)	15.5 (59.9)	18.5 (65.3)	17.0 (62.6)	20.0 (68.0)	19.0 (66.2)	16.5 (61.7)	13.0 (55.4)	8.0 (46.4)	6.0 (42.8)
Average rainfall mm (inches)	20.6 (0.81)	40.4 (1.59)	102.6 (4.04)	333.4 (13.13)	631.1 (24.85)	1,069.1 (42.09)	1,216.8 (47.91)	1,075.2 (42.33)	665.9 (26.22)	213.8 (8.42)	32.9 (1.30)	14.3 (0.56)	5,416.1 (213.25)
Average rainy days (≥ 0.1 mm)	2.5	4.3	8.7	15.1	21.0	25.7	28.8	27.7	22.1	10.3	2.6	1.6	170.4
Average relative humidity (%)	57.3	59.6	59.1	65.2	72.1	81.9	85.6	83.0	80.1	68.5	60.7	57.0	69.2
Source 1: National Center for Hydrology and Meteorology
Source 2: World Meteorological Organization (rainy days 1996–2018)

Climate data for Tendru, Samtse District, elevation 1,000 m (3,300 ft), (1996–2017 normals)
Month	Jan	Feb	Mar	Apr	May	Jun	Jul	Aug	Sep	Oct	Nov	Dec	Year
Record high °C (°F)	24.0 (75.2)	28.5 (83.3)	29.0 (84.2)	30.0 (86.0)	30.0 (86.0)	31.0 (87.8)	34.5 (94.1)	33.0 (91.4)	33.0 (91.4)	32.0 (89.6)	29.7 (85.5)	27.0 (80.6)	34.5 (94.1)
Mean daily maximum °C (°F)	18.8 (65.8)	19.4 (66.9)	22.1 (71.8)	23.9 (75.0)	25.3 (77.5)	26.6 (79.9)	26.8 (80.2)	26.5 (79.7)	26.0 (78.8)	25.0 (77.0)	22.5 (72.5)	19.6 (67.3)	23.5 (74.4)
Daily mean °C (°F)	13.9 (57.0)	15.5 (59.9)	18.4 (65.1)	20.6 (69.1)	22.2 (72.0)	23.7 (74.7)	24.0 (75.2)	23.6 (74.5)	23.1 (73.6)	21.4 (70.5)	18.4 (65.1)	15.5 (59.9)	20.0 (68.1)
Mean daily minimum °C (°F)	9.8 (49.6)	11.6 (52.9)	14.7 (58.5)	17.2 (63.0)	19.0 (66.2)	20.8 (69.4)	21.2 (70.2)	20.6 (69.1)	20.2 (68.4)	17.7 (63.9)	14.3 (57.7)	11.3 (52.3)	16.5 (61.8)
Record low °C (°F)	0.0 (32.0)	4.0 (39.2)	6.0 (42.8)	10.0 (50.0)	12.0 (53.6)	15.0 (59.0)	16.0 (60.8)	13.0 (55.4)	13.0 (55.4)	12.0 (53.6)	7.5 (45.5)	4.0 (39.2)	0.0 (32.0)
Average rainfall mm (inches)	23.0 (0.91)	58.6 (2.31)	106.2 (4.18)	206.0 (8.11)	341.0 (13.43)	593.6 (23.37)	954.4 (37.57)	826.8 (32.55)	559.4 (22.02)	211.3 (8.32)	12.6 (0.50)	5.7 (0.22)	3,898.6 (153.49)
Average relative humidity (%)	69.1	68.1	67.8	70.5	78.3	83.5	86.4	85.7	82.9	76.0	69.1	63.5	75.1
Source: National Center for Hydrology and Meteorology

== See also ==
- Districts of Bhutan
- Paro Province
