= Sibsu =

Settlement in Bhutan

- Village
- Location in Bhutan
- Coordinates: 27°00′N 88°54′E
- Country: Bhutan
- District: Samtse District
- Time zone: UTC+6 (BTT)

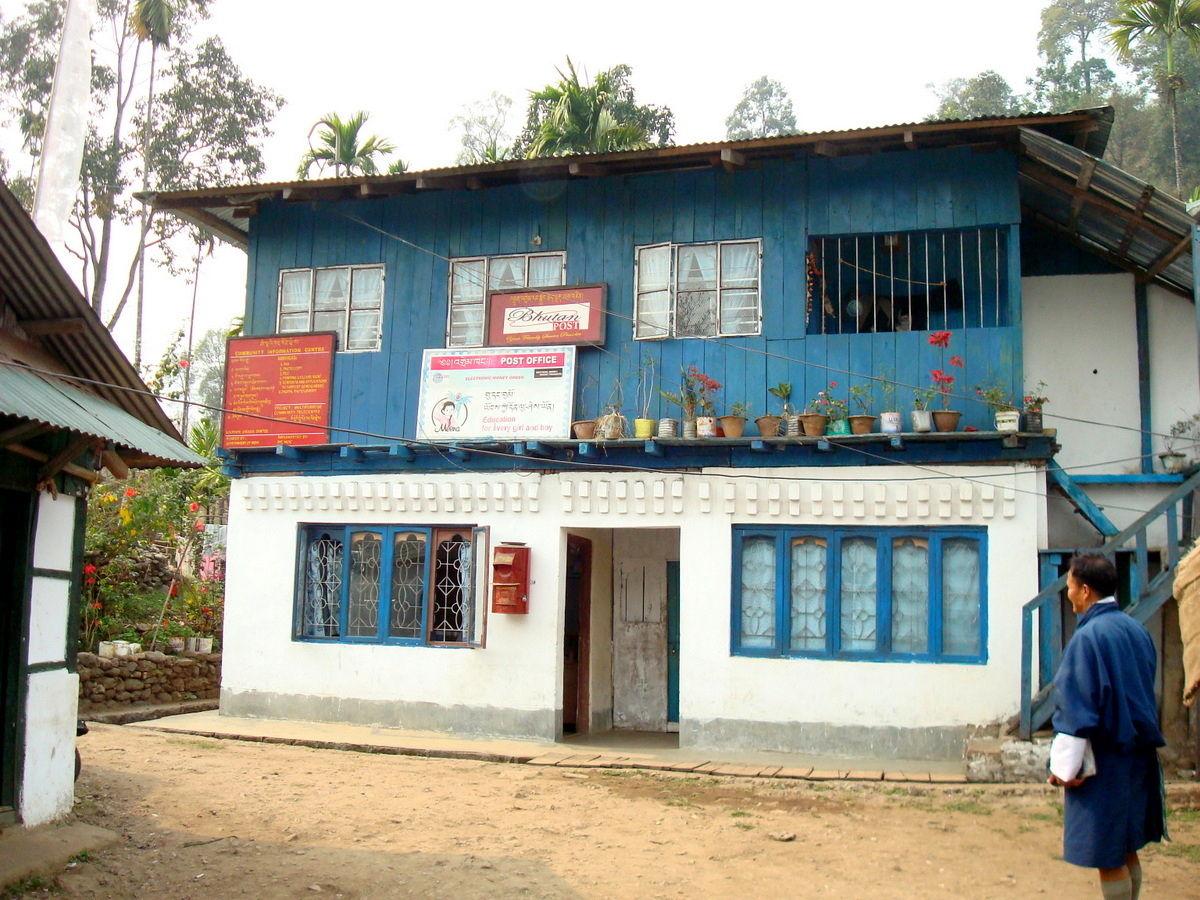
Post office in Sibsu, Bhutan, 2009

Sibsu, also spelt Sibsoo is a settlement in the far west of Bhutan. It is located in Samtse District, close to the border with India. Sibsu is home to Shivalaya Mandir Temple and Pinjuli School.

== Bibliography ==
- Armington, S. (2002) Bhutan. (2nd ed.) Melbourne: Lonely Planet.
