= Norbugang Gewog (Samtse) =

Norbugang Gewog ནོར་བུ་སྒང་
- Gewogs
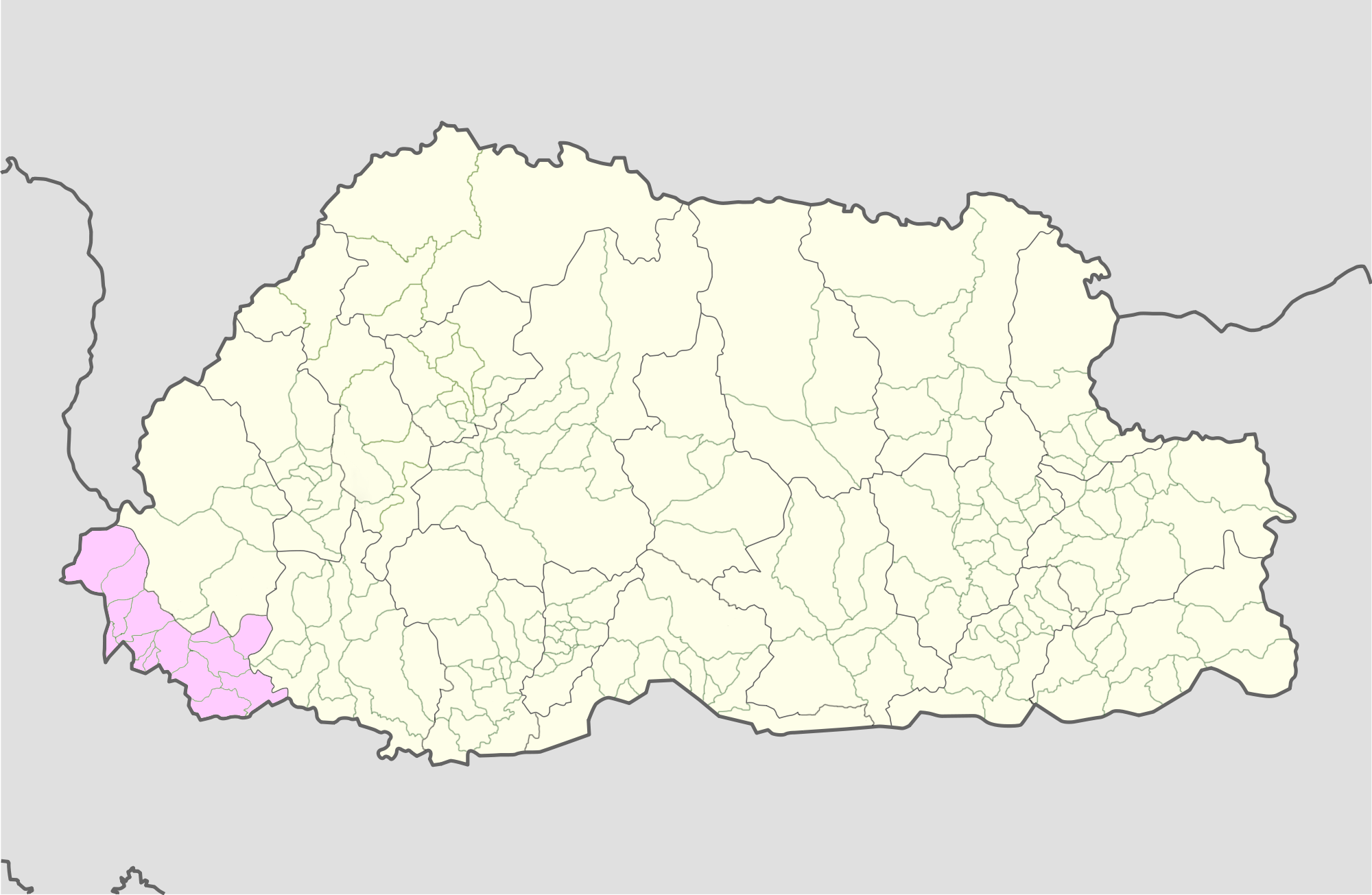
- Country: Bhutan
- District: Samtse District
- Time zone: UTC+6 (BTT)

Norbugang Gewog (Dzongkha: ནོར་བུ་སྒང་) is a gewog (village block) of Samtse District, Bhutan.
