= Samtse =

Samtse ་བསམ་རྩེ
- Town
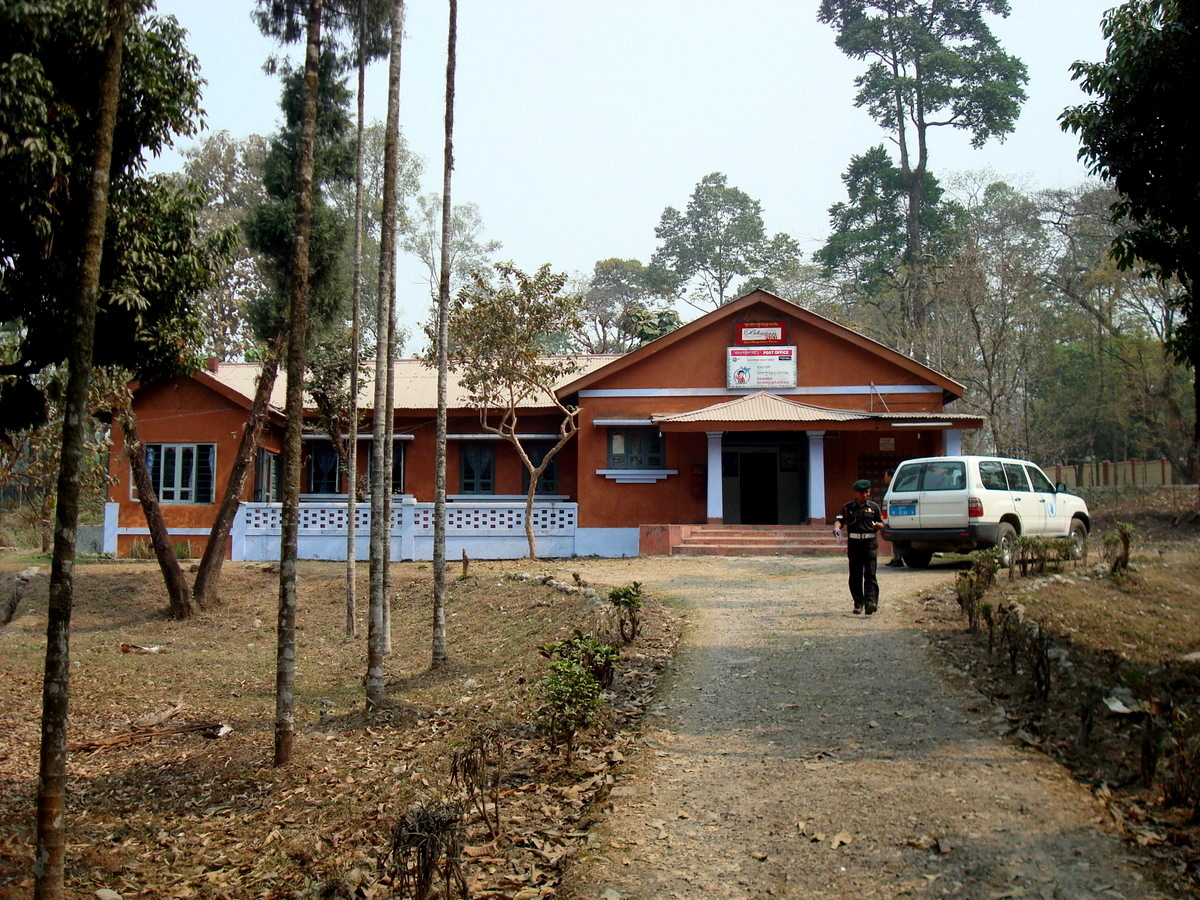
- Post office in Samtse

- Location in Bhutan
- Coordinates: 27°2′N 89°5′E
- Country: Bhutan
- District: Samtse
- Village block: Samtse Gewog
- Elevation: 417 m (1,368 ft)

Population (2017)
  - Total: 5,396
- Time zone: UTC+6 (BTT)

Samtse is a town and the headquarters of the Samtse District in Bhutan. The population of the town was 5,396 as of 2017. The population of the Samtse district was 60,100 at the 2005 census.

Samtse is close to the Bhutan–India border.

== Climate ==
Samtse features a dry-winter humid subtropical climate (Köppen Cwa) with very heavy rainfall in summer.

Climate data for Samtse (Sibsu), elevation 550 m (1,800 ft), (1996–2017 normals)
Month	Jan	Feb	Mar	Apr	May	Jun	Jul	Aug	Sep	Oct	Nov	Dec	Year
Record high °C (°F)	30.0 (86.0)	32.0 (89.6)	32.0 (89.6)	34.0 (93.2)	34.0 (93.2)	34.0 (93.2)	34.5 (94.1)	34.5 (94.1)	34.0 (93.2)	34.5 (94.1)	32.0 (89.6)	30.2 (86.4)	34.5 (94.1)
Mean daily maximum °C (°F)	21.2 (70.2)	23.5 (74.3)	26.6 (79.9)	28.1 (82.6)	28.8 (83.8)	29.0 (84.2)	28.6 (83.5)	29.2 (84.6)	29.2 (84.6)	28.6 (83.5)	26.0 (78.8)	23.3 (73.9)	26.8 (80.3)
Daily mean °C (°F)	17.1 (62.8)	19.4 (66.9)	22.5 (72.5)	24.3 (75.7)	25.3 (77.5)	26.2 (79.2)	26.2 (79.2)	26.6 (79.9)	26.4 (79.5)	24.9 (76.8)	21.9 (71.4)	19.0 (66.2)	23.3 (74.0)
Mean daily minimum °C (°F)	13.0 (55.4)	15.2 (59.4)	18.3 (64.9)	20.5 (68.9)	21.8 (71.2)	23.3 (73.9)	23.7 (74.7)	24.0 (75.2)	23.6 (74.5)	21.2 (70.2)	17.7 (63.9)	14.7 (58.5)	19.7 (67.6)
Record low °C (°F)	6.0 (42.8)	10.0 (50.0)	11.0 (51.8)	15.0 (59.0)	15.5 (59.9)	18.5 (65.3)	17.0 (62.6)	20.0 (68.0)	19.0 (66.2)	16.5 (61.7)	13.0 (55.4)	8.0 (46.4)	6.0 (42.8)
Average rainfall mm (inches)	20.6 (0.81)	40.4 (1.59)	102.6 (4.04)	333.4 (13.13)	631.1 (24.85)	1,069.1 (42.09)	1,216.8 (47.91)	1,075.2 (42.33)	665.9 (26.22)	213.8 (8.42)	32.9 (1.30)	14.3 (0.56)	5,416.1 (213.25)
Average rainy days (≥ 0.1 mm)	2.5	4.3	8.7	15.1	21.0	25.7	28.8	27.7	22.1	10.3	2.6	1.6	170.4
Average relative humidity (%)	57.3	59.6	59.1	65.2	72.1	81.9	85.6	83.0	80.1	68.5	60.7	57.0	69.2
Source 1: National Center for Hydrology and Meteorology
Source 2: World Meteorological Organization (rainy days 1996–2018)
