= Chiwogs of Bhutan =

Basic electoral precincts of Bhutan

Chiwogs of Bhutan (Dzongkha: སྤྱི་འོག; Wylie: spyi 'og) refer to the 1044 basic electoral precincts of Bhutan. Chiwogs are also former third-level administrative divisions of Bhutan below gewogs. Until 2009, they were the equivalent of municipalities or parishes, containing clusters of villages and hamlets. There are generally 5 or 6 chiwogs in each gewog, and in turn several gewogs in each dzongkha (district). To illustrate, there are 50 chiwogs in Paro District alone. The majority of chiwogs are small rural communities; more densely populated areas tend to be separate thromdes, or municipalities. A Chiwog Disaster Management Plan (CDMP) exists in some chiwogs to form an effective responsive to any local disasters. Often, participants in the CDMP are also trained at a geo level for better coordination.

== Legal status ==
Until 2009, chios were administrative divisions subordinate to geos. Under the 2008 Constitution, chios are mentioned only as electorates, defined as "under a gewog," but did not specifically repeal the administrative status of chios. Under the Election Act of 2008, chios are basic electoral constituencies within geos to elect one member of the Geo Tshokde (county committee) and Dzongkha Thromde (district council). The legal status of chios as electoral precincts is confirmed by the Local Government Act of 2009, which repeals the Local Government Act of 2007 and provides no administrative role for chios.

== List of Chiwogs ==
The following is a list of the 1,044 chiwogs of Bhutan as of 2011:

=== Bumthang District ===
Dzongkhag	Gewog	Chiwog
Bumthang བུམ་ཐང་རྫོང་ཁག	Chhoekhor ཆོས་འཁོར་རྒེད་འོག	Nangisphel Zangling Zhabjethang སྣང་སྲིད་འཕེལ་བཟང་གླིང་ཞབས་རྗེས་ཐང་་སྤྱི་འོག
Bumthang བུམ་ཐང་རྫོང་ཁག	Chhoekhor ཆོས་འཁོར་རྒེད་འོག	Dhur Lusibee དུར་ལུ་སི་བི་སྤྱི་འོག
Bumthang བུམ་ཐང་རྫོང་ཁག	Chhoekhor ཆོས་འཁོར་རྒེད་འོག	Kharsa Thangbi མཁར་ས་ཐང་སྦི་སྤྱི་འོག
Bumthang བུམ་ཐང་རྫོང་ཁག	Chhoekhor ཆོས་འཁོར་རྒེད་འོག	Dawathang Dorjibi Kashingtsawa ཟླ་བ་ཐང་རྡོ་རྗི་སྦིས་ཀ་ཤིང་རྩ་བ་སྤྱི་འོག
Bumthang བུམ་ཐང་རྫོང་ཁག	Chhoekhor ཆོས་འཁོར་རྒེད་འོག	Pedtsheling Tamshing པད་ཚལ་གླིང་གཏམ་ཞིང་སྤྱི་འོག
Bumthang བུམ་ཐང་རྫོང་ཁག	Chhume ཆུ་མིག་རྒེད་འོག	Gyaltsa རྒྱལ་རྩ་སྤྱི་འོག
Bumthang བུམ་ཐང་རྫོང་ཁག	Chhume ཆུ་མིག་རྒེད་འོག	Domkhar དོམ་མཁར་སྤྱི་འོག
Bumthang བུམ་ཐང་རྫོང་ཁག	Chhume ཆུ་མིག་རྒེད་འོག	Phurjoen ཕུར་བྱོན་སྤྱི་འོག
Bumthang བུམ་ཐང་རྫོང་ཁག	Chhume ཆུ་མིག་རྒེད་འོག	Zungngae ཅུང་འཕེལ་སྤྱི་འོག
Bumthang བུམ་ཐང་རྫོང་ཁག	Chhume ཆུ་མིག་རྒེད་འོག	Choongphel ཅུང་འཕེལ་སྤྱི་འོག
Bumthang བུམ་ཐང་རྫོང་ཁག	Tang སྟང་རྒེད་འོག	Tadingang རྟ་མཁྲི་སྒང་སྤྱི་འོག
Bumthang བུམ་ཐང་རྫོང་ཁག	Tang སྟང་རྒེད་འོག	Khangrab ཁང་རབས་སྤྱི་འོག
Bumthang བུམ་ཐང་རྫོང་ཁག	Tang སྟང་རྒེད་འོག	Kidzom Nyimalung སྐྱིད་འཛོམས་_ཉི་མ་ལུང་སྤྱི་འོག
Bumthang བུམ་ཐང་རྫོང་ཁག	Tang སྟང་རྒེད་འོག	Dazur མདའ་ཟུར་སྤྱི་འོག
Bumthang བུམ་ཐང་རྫོང་ཁག	Tang སྟང་རྒེད་འོག	Bezur Kuenzargdrag སྦས་ཟུར་ཀུན་བཟང་བྲག་སྤྱི་འོག
Bumthang བུམ་ཐང་རྫོང་ཁག	Ura ཨུ་ར་རྒེད་འོག	Beteng Pangkhar Soomthrang སྦེ་སྟེང་སྤང་མཁར་སུམ་ཕྲང་སྤྱི་འོག
Bumthang བུམ་ཐང་རྫོང་ཁག	Ura ཨུ་ར་རྒེད་འོག	Tangsibi སྟངས་སི་སྦི་སྤྱི་འོག
Bumthang བུམ་ཐང་རྫོང་ཁག	Ura ཨུ་ར་རྒེད་འོག	Shing-Nyer ཤིང་གཉེར་སྤྱི་འོག
Bumthang བུམ་ཐང་རྫོང་ཁག	Ura ཨུ་ར་རྒེད་འོག	Ura-Dozhi ཨུ་ར་མདོ་བཞི་སྤྱི་འོག
Bumthang བུམ་ཐང་རྫོང་ཁག	Ura ཨུ་ར་རྒེད་འོག	Singkhar ཤིང་མཁར་སྤྱི་འོག

=== Chukha District ===
Dzongkhag	Gewog	Chiwog
Chhukha ཆུ་ཁ་རྫོང་ཁག	Bjachho བྱག་ཕྱོགས་རྒེད་འོག	Bjagchhog བྱག་ཕྱོགས་སྤྱི་འོག
Chhukha ཆུ་ཁ་རྫོང་ཁག	Bjachho བྱག་ཕྱོགས་རྒེད་འོག	Tsimakha Tsimasham བརྩི་མ་ཁ་བརྩི་མ་གཤམ་སྤྱི་འོག
Chhukha ཆུ་ཁ་རྫོང་ཁག	Bjachho བྱག་ཕྱོགས་རྒེད་འོག	Mebisa མེ་སྦི་ས་སྤྱི་འོག
Chhukha ཆུ་ཁ་རྫོང་ཁག	Bjachho བྱག་ཕྱོགས་རྒེད་འོག	Tashi Gatshel བཀྲིས་དགའ་ཚལ་སྤྱི་འོག
Chhukha ཆུ་ཁ་རྫོང་ཁག	Bjachho བྱག་ཕྱོགས་རྒེད་འོག	Wangkha ལྦང་ཁ་སྤྱི་འོག
Chhukha ཆུ་ཁ་རྫོང་ཁག	Bongo སྦོང་སྒོར་རྒེད་འོག	Togtokha Togtogongm རྟོག་རྟོ་ཁ་རྟོག་རྟོ་གོངམ་སྤྱི་འོག
Chhukha ཆུ་ཁ་རྫོང་ཁག	Bongo སྦོང་སྒོར་རྒེད་འོག	Choongkha Chhasilakha སྐྱུང་ཁ་ཆཱ་སི་ལ་ཁ་སྤྱི་འོག
Chhukha ཆུ་ཁ་རྫོང་ཁག	Bongo སྦོང་སྒོར་རྒེད་འོག	Gedu Miritsemo དགེ་འདུ་མི་རི་རྩེ་མོ་སྤྱི་འོག
Chhukha ཆུ་ཁ་རྫོང་ཁག	Bongo སྦོང་སྒོར་རྒེད་འོག	Ketogkha སྐད་ལྟོག་ཁ་སྤྱི་འོག
Chhukha ཆུ་ཁ་རྫོང་ཁག	Bongo སྦོང་སྒོར་རྒེད་འོག	Bongo Phasooma སྦོང་སྒོར་ཕ་སུ་མ་སྤྱི་འོག
Chhukha ཆུ་ཁ་རྫོང་ཁག	Bongo སྦོང་སྒོར་རྒེད་འོག	Baeyuel Kunzang སྦས་ཡུལ་ཀུན་བཟང་སྤྱི་འོག
Chhukha ཆུ་ཁ་རྫོང་ཁག	Chapcha སྐྱབས་ཆ་རྒེད་འོག	Pagga སྤག་དགའ་སྤྱི་འོག
Chhukha ཆུ་ཁ་རྫོང་ཁག	Chapcha སྐྱབས་ཆ་རྒེད་འོག	Tshamdrag མཚམས་བྲག་སྤྱི་འོག
Chhukha ཆུ་ཁ་རྫོང་ཁག	Chapcha སྐྱབས་ཆ་རྒེད་འོག	Gangkha Shelyuel སྒང་ཁ་ཤེལ་ཡུལ་སྤྱི་འོག
Chhukha ཆུ་ཁ་རྫོང་ཁག	Chapcha སྐྱབས་ཆ་རྒེད་འོག	Dokharchhu Rimtekha རྡོ་མཁར་ཆུ་རིམ་སྟེ་ཁ་སྤྱི་འོག
Chhukha ཆུ་ཁ་རྫོང་ཁག	Chapcha སྐྱབས་ཆ་རྒེད་འོག	Lang Nyelsa གླང་ཉལ་ས་སྤྱི་འོག
Chhukha ཆུ་ཁ་རྫོང་ཁག	Chapcha སྐྱབས་ཆ་རྒེད་འོག	Bunakha སྦུ་ན་ཁ་སྤྱི་འོག
Chhukha ཆུ་ཁ་རྫོང་ཁག	Darla དར་ལ་རྒེད་འོག	Tagp-thang-boog སྟགཔ་ཐང་སྦུག་སྤྱི་འོག
Chhukha ཆུ་ཁ་རྫོང་ཁག	Darla དར་ལ་རྒེད་འོག	Nyimgang Tabji ཉིམ་སྒང་སྟབས་ཇི་སྤྱི་འོག
Chhukha ཆུ་ཁ་རྫོང་ཁག	Darla དར་ལ་རྒེད་འོག	Gengu Yagang གྱན་གུ་ཡ་སྒང་སྤྱི་འོག
Chhukha ཆུ་ཁ་རྫོང་ཁག	Darla དར་ལ་རྒེད་འོག	Samarchen Sinchula ས་དམར་ཅན་སིན་ཅུ་ལ་སྤྱི་འོག
Chhukha ཆུ་ཁ་རྫོང་ཁག	Darla དར་ལ་རྒེད་འོག	Gamanang Kalzangri དགའ་མ་ནང་སྐལ་བཟང་རི་སྤྱི་འོག
Chhukha ཆུ་ཁ་རྫོང་ཁག	Darla དར་ལ་རྒེད་འོག	Sharphug ཤར་ཕུག་སྤྱི་འོག
Chhukha ཆུ་ཁ་རྫོང་ཁག	Dungna གདུང་ན་རྒེད་འོག	Babana Papaling བ་བ་ན་པ་པ་གླིང་སྤྱི་འོག
Chhukha ཆུ་ཁ་རྫོང་ཁག	Dungna གདུང་ན་རྒེད་འོག	Chhulakha Mangdokha ཆུ་ལ་ཁ་དམངས་རྡོ་ཁསྤྱི་འོག
Chhukha ཆུ་ཁ་རྫོང་ཁག	Dungna གདུང་ན་རྒེད་འོག	Doongna Pagsellhakha གདུང་ན་དཔག་སེལ་ལྷ་ཁ་སྤྱི་འོག
Chhukha ཆུ་ཁ་རྫོང་ཁག	Dungna གདུང་ན་རྒེད་འོག	Drukdingsa Khori འབྲུག་སྡིང་ས་ཁོ་རི་སྤྱི་འོག
Chhukha ཆུ་ཁ་རྫོང་ཁག	Dungna གདུང་ན་རྒེད་འོག	Damchekha Uezhi དམ་ཆེཁ་གཡུས་བཞི་སྤྱི་འོག
Chhukha ཆུ་ཁ་རྫོང་ཁག	Geling དགེ་གླིང་རྒེད་འོག	Gelingkha Tsanglina དགེ་གླིང་གཙང་ལི་ན་སྤྱི་འོག
Chhukha ཆུ་ཁ་རྫོང་ཁག	Geling དགེ་གླིང་རྒེད་འོག	Dagpa Sorchhen དྭགས་པ་སོར་ཅན་སྤྱི་འོག
Chhukha ཆུ་ཁ་རྫོང་ཁག	Geling དགེ་གླིང་རྒེད་འོག	Geling Geygoen དགེ་གླིང་རྒས་དགོན་སྤྱི་འོག
Chhukha ཆུ་ཁ་རྫོང་ཁག	Geling དགེ་གླིང་རྒེད་འོག	Kamji Nayekha སྐམ་སྦྱིས་ན་ཡེ་ཁ་སྤྱི་འོག
Chhukha ཆུ་ཁ་རྫོང་ཁག	Geling དགེ་གླིང་རྒེད་འོག	Dilibkha Lamjokha འདི་ལིབ་ཁ་ལམ་འགྱོ་ཁ་སྤྱི་འོག
Chhukha ཆུ་ཁ་རྫོང་ཁག	Getana གད་སྟག་ན་རྒེད་འོག	Darga Tshebji དར་ག་ཚེབ་སྦྱི་སྤྱི་འོག
Chhukha ཆུ་ཁ་རྫོང་ཁག	Getana གད་སྟག་ན་རྒེད་འོག	Tashigang བཀྲིས་སྒང་སྤྱི་འོག
Chhukha ཆུ་ཁ་རྫོང་ཁག	Getana གད་སྟག་ན་རྒེད་འོག	Janamo Phootsha གདུང་ན་རྒེད་
Chhukha ཆུ་ཁ་རྫོང་ཁག	Getana གད་སྟག་ན་རྒེད་འོག	Bachhu Getana བ་ཆུ་གད་སྟག་ན་སྤྱི་འོག
Chhukha ཆུ་ཁ་རྫོང་ཁག	Getana གད་སྟག་ན་རྒེད་འོག	Chiyuel Getag སྤི་ཡུལ་གད་སྟག་སྤྱི་འོག
Chhukha ཆུ་ཁ་རྫོང་ཁག	Lokchina ལོག་ཅི་ན་རྒེད་འོག	Chagdokha Damchekha ལྕགས་རྡོ་ཁ་དམ་ཆེ་ཁ་སྤྱི་འོག
Chhukha ཆུ་ཁ་རྫོང་ཁག	Lokchina ལོག་ཅི་ན་རྒེད་འོག	Dolepchen Bjagchhu རྡོ་ལེབ་ཅན་བྱག་ཆུ་སྤྱི་འོག
Chhukha ཆུ་ཁ་རྫོང་ཁག	Lokchina ལོག་ཅི་ན་རྒེད་འོག	Aamleg Dofam ཨམ་ལེགས་རྡོ་ཕཱམ་སྤྱི་འོག
Chhukha ཆུ་ཁ་རྫོང་ཁག	Lokchina ལོག་ཅི་ན་རྒེད་འོག	Dzedokha ཛེ་རྡོ་ཁ་སྤྱི་འོག
Chhukha ཆུ་ཁ་རྫོང་ཁག	Lokchina ལོག་ཅི་ན་རྒེད་འོག	Mongna Lhasarp མོང་ན་ལྷ་གསརཔ་སྤྱི་འོག
Chhukha ཆུ་ཁ་རྫོང་ཁག	Metakha སྨད་བཏབ་ཁ་རྒེད་འོག	Pangu སྤང་འགུ་སྤྱི་འོག
Chhukha ཆུ་ཁ་རྫོང་ཁག	Metakha སྨད་བཏབ་ཁ་རྒེད་འོག	Jozhingkha Maedtab Toed ཇོ་ཞིང་ཁ་སྨད་བཏབ་སྟོད་སྤྱི་འོག
Chhukha ཆུ་ཁ་རྫོང་ཁག	Metakha སྨད་བཏབ་ཁ་རྒེད་འོག	Maedtab Maed སྨད་བཏབ་སྨད་སྤྱི་འོག
Chhukha ཆུ་ཁ་རྫོང་ཁག	Metakha སྨད་བཏབ་ཁ་རྒེད་འོག	Uekha གཡུས་ཁ་སྤྱི་འོག
Chhukha ཆུ་ཁ་རྫོང་ཁག	Metakha སྨད་བཏབ་ཁ་རྒེད་འོག	Gumina Tenchhukha མགུ་མི་ན་བསྟན་ཆུ་ཁ་སྤྱི་འོག
Chhukha ཆུ་ཁ་རྫོང་ཁག	Phuentsholing ཕུན་ཚོགས་གླིང་རྒེད་འོག	Lingdaen གླིང་ལྡན་སྤྱི་འོག
Chhukha ཆུ་ཁ་རྫོང་ཁག	Phuentsholing ཕུན་ཚོགས་གླིང་རྒེད་འོག	Pachhu སྤ་ཆུ་སྤྱི་འོག
Chhukha ཆུ་ཁ་རྫོང་ཁག	Phuentsholing ཕུན་ཚོགས་གླིང་རྒེད་འོག	Dophugchen Wangduegatshel རྡོ་ཕུག་ཅན་དབང་འདུས་དགའ་ཚལ་སྤྱི་འོག
Chhukha ཆུ་ཁ་རྫོང་ཁག	Phuentsholing ཕུན་ཚོགས་གླིང་རྒེད་འོག	Deling Marpji བདེ་གླིང་དམརཔ་སྦྱིས་སྤྱི་འོག
Chhukha ཆུ་ཁ་རྫོང་ཁག	Phuentsholing ཕུན་ཚོགས་གླིང་རྒེད་འོག	Chonggeykha Dophulakha ཅོང་གེ་ཁ་རྡོ་ཕུ་ལ་ཁ་སྤྱི་འོག
Chhukha ཆུ་ཁ་རྫོང་ཁག	Sampheling བསམ་འཕེལ་གླིང་རྒེད་འོག	Pekarling Rigzingling པད་དཀར་གླིང་རིག་འཟིན་གླིང་སྤྱི་འོག
Chhukha ཆུ་ཁ་རྫོང་ཁག	Sampheling བསམ་འཕེལ་གླིང་རྒེད་འོག	Sengyagang Tshochhoongna སེ་དྒེ་སྒང་མཚོ་ཆུང་ན་སྤྱི་འོག
Chhukha ཆུ་ཁ་རྫོང་ཁག	Sampheling བསམ་འཕེལ་གླིང་རྒེད་འོག	Khenpaithang Soramthang མཁན་པའི་ཐང་བསོད་ནམས་ཐང་སྤྱི་འོག
Chhukha ཆུ་ཁ་རྫོང་ཁག	Sampheling བསམ་འཕེལ་གླིང་རྒེད་འོག	Gorgboogang Pangna སྒོང་བུ་སྒང་སྤང་ན་སྤྱི་འོག
Chhukha ཆུ་ཁ་རྫོང་ཁག	Sampheling བསམ་འཕེལ་གླིང་རྒེད་འོག	Pedtshelnang པད་ཚལ་ནང་སྤྱི་འོག

=== Dagana District ===
Dzongkhag	Gewog	Chiwog
Dagana དར་དཀར་ན་རྫོང་ཁག	Dorona རྡོ་རོ་ན་རྒེད་འོག	Maamedthang དམའ་མེད་ཐང་སྤྱི་འོག
Dagana དར་དཀར་ན་རྫོང་ཁག	Dorona རྡོ་རོ་ན་རྒེད་འོག	Nyimtola ཉིམ་ཏོ་ལ་སྤྱི་འོག
Dagana དར་དཀར་ན་རྫོང་ཁག	Dorona རྡོ་རོ་ན་རྒེད་འོག	Dorona Chhongwa རྡོ་རོ་ན་ཆུང་བ་སྤྱི་འོག
Dagana དར་དཀར་ན་རྫོང་ཁག	Dorona རྡོ་རོ་ན་རྒེད་འོག	Dorona Chhewa རྡོ་རོ་ན་ཆེ་བ་སྤྱི་འོག
Dagana དར་དཀར་ན་རྫོང་ཁག	Dorona རྡོ་རོ་ན་རྒེད་འོག	Tshalamji ཚྭ་ལམ་སྦྱིས་སྤྱི་འོག
Dagana དར་དཀར་ན་རྫོང་ཁག	Drujegang འབྲུག་རྗེས་སྒང་རྒེད་འོག	Pangna Patala སྤང་ན་སྤྱི་འོགཔ་ཏ་ལ་སྤྱི་འོག
Dagana དར་དཀར་ན་རྫོང་ཁག	Drujegang འབྲུག་རྗེས་སྒང་རྒེད་འོག	Thangna ཐང་ན་སྤྱི་འོག
Dagana དར་དཀར་ན་རྫོང་ཁག	Drujegang འབྲུག་རྗེས་སྒང་རྒེད་འོག	Budepang Pangna སྦུ་བདེ་སྤང་སྤང་ན་སྤྱི་འོག
Dagana དར་དཀར་ན་རྫོང་ཁག	Drujegang འབྲུག་རྗེས་སྒང་རྒེད་འོག	Ambithang Pangserpo ཨམ་བི་ཐང་སྤང་སེར་པོ་སྤྱི་འོག
Dagana དར་དཀར་ན་རྫོང་ཁག	Drujegang འབྲུག་རྗེས་སྒང་རྒེད་འོག	Pangserpo སྤང་སེར་པོ་སྤྱི་འོག
Dagana དར་དཀར་ན་རྫོང་ཁག	Gesarling གེ་སར་གླིང་རྒེད་འོག	Tajoog རྟ་རྒྱུགས་སྤྱི་འོག
Dagana དར་དཀར་ན་རྫོང་ཁག	Gesarling གེ་སར་གླིང་རྒེད་འོག	Samtengang བསམ་རྟན་སྒང་སྤྱི་འོག
Dagana དར་དཀར་ན་རྫོང་ཁག	Gesarling གེ་སར་གླིང་རྒེད་འོག	Gesarling གེ་སར་གླིང་སྤྱི་འོག
Dagana དར་དཀར་ན་རྫོང་ཁག	Gesarling གེ་སར་གླིང་རྒེད་འོག	Phuensoomgang སྤུན་སུམ་སྒང་སྤྱི་འོག
Dagana དར་དཀར་ན་རྫོང་ཁག	Gesarling གེ་སར་གླིང་རྒེད་འོག	Tashithang བཀྲིས་ཐང་སྤྱི་འོག
Dagana དར་དཀར་ན་རྫོང་ཁག	Goshi སྒོ་བཞི་རྒེད་འོག	Baleggang སྦ་ལེགས་སྒང་སྤྱི་འོག
Dagana དར་དཀར་ན་རྫོང་ཁག	Goshi སྒོ་བཞི་རྒེད་འོག	Dogaag རྡོ་འགག་སྤྱི་འོག
Dagana དར་དཀར་ན་རྫོང་ཁག	Goshi སྒོ་བཞི་རྒེད་འོག	Gozhi སྒོ་བཞི་སྤྱི་འོག
Dagana དར་དཀར་ན་རྫོང་ཁག	Goshi སྒོ་བཞི་རྒེད་འོག	Gozhi Maed སྒོ་བཞི་སྨད་སྤྱི་འོག
Dagana དར་དཀར་ན་རྫོང་ཁག	Goshi སྒོ་བཞི་རྒེད་འོག	Gozhi Toed སྒོ་བཞི་སྟོད་སྤྱི་འོག
Dagana དར་དཀར་ན་རྫོང་ཁག	Kana བཀར་ན་རྒེད་འོག	Lhaling ལྷ་གླིངསྤྱི་འོག
Dagana དར་དཀར་ན་རྫོང་ཁག	Kana བཀར་ན་རྒེད་འོག	Purgzhi སྤང་གཞི་སྤྱི་འོག
Dagana དར་དཀར་ན་རྫོང་ཁག	Kana བཀར་ན་རྒེད་འོག	Dalithang Gangjab Khagochen ད་ལི་ཐང་སྒང་རྒྱབ་ཁ་སྒོ་ཅན་སྤྱི་འོག
Dagana དར་དཀར་ན་རྫོང་ཁག	Kana བཀར་ན་རྒེད་འོག	Bartsha Namgyalgang བར་ཚྭརྣམ་རྒྱལ་སྒང་སྤྱི་འོག
Dagana དར་དཀར་ན་རྫོང་ཁག	Kana བཀར་ན་རྒེད་འོག	Jurugang རྒྱུ་རུ་སྒང་སྤྱི་འོག
Dagana དར་དཀར་ན་རྫོང་ཁག	Karmaling ཀརྨ་གླིང་རྒེད་འོག	Karmaling ཀརྨ་གླིང་སྤྱི་འོག
Dagana དར་དཀར་ན་རྫོང་ཁག	Karmaling ཀརྨ་གླིང་རྒེད་འོག	Omchhu ཨོམ་ཆུ་སྤྱི་འོག
Dagana དར་དཀར་ན་རྫོང་ཁག	Karmaling ཀརྨ་གླིང་རྒེད་འོག	Labtsakha ལབ་རྩ་ཁ་སྤྱི་འོག
Dagana དར་དཀར་ན་རྫོང་ཁག	Karmaling ཀརྨ་གླིང་རྒེད་འོག	Senchumthang སྲན་ཅུམ་ཐང་སྤྱི་འོག
Dagana དར་དཀར་ན་རྫོང་ཁག	Karmaling ཀརྨ་གླིང་རྒེད་འོག	Jemathang བྱེ་མ་ཐང་སྤྱི་འོག
Dagana དར་དཀར་ན་རྫོང་ཁག	Khebisa ཁེ་སྦིས་ས་རྒེད་འོག	Pogtog སྤོག་ཏོག་སྤྱི་འོག
Dagana དར་དཀར་ན་རྫོང་ཁག	Khebisa ཁེ་སྦིས་ས་རྒེད་འོག	Pagser དཔག་གསེར་སྤྱི་འོག
Dagana དར་དཀར་ན་རྫོང་ཁག	Khebisa ཁེ་སྦིས་ས་རྒེད་འོག	Akhochen ཨ་ཁོ་ཅན་སྤྱི་འོག
Dagana དར་དཀར་ན་རྫོང་ཁག	Khebisa ཁེ་སྦིས་ས་རྒེད་འོག	Thomgang མཐོངམ་སྒང་སྤྱི་འོག
Dagana དར་དཀར་ན་རྫོང་ཁག	Khebisa ཁེ་སྦིས་ས་རྒེད་འོག	Gibsa གྱིབ་ས་སྤྱི་འོག
Dagana དར་དཀར་ན་རྫོང་ཁག	Lagyab ལ་རྒྱབ་རྒེད་འོག	Baloong བ་ལུང་སྤྱི་འོག
Dagana དར་དཀར་ན་རྫོང་ཁག	Lagyab ལ་རྒྱབ་རྒེད་འོག	Thasa ཐ་ས་སྤྱི་འོག
Dagana དར་དཀར་ན་རྫོང་ཁག	Lagyab ལ་རྒྱབ་རྒེད་འོག	Kompa སྐོན་པ་སྤྱི་འོག
Dagana དར་དཀར་ན་རྫོང་ཁག	Lagyab ལ་རྒྱབ་རྒེད་འོག	Barna བར་ན་སྤྱི་འོག
Dagana དར་དཀར་ན་རྫོང་ཁག	Lagyab ལ་རྒྱབ་རྒེད་འོག	Sidpa སྲིད་པ་སྤྱི་འོག
Dagana དར་དཀར་ན་རྫོང་ཁག	Lhamoi Zingkha ལྷ་མོའི་རྫིང་ཁ་རྒེད་འོག	Tshaemzhigosa མཚམས་བཞི་བགོ་ས་སྤྱི་འོག
Dagana དར་དཀར་ན་རྫོང་ཁག	Lhamoi Zingkha ལྷ་མོའི་རྫིང་ཁ་རྒེད་འོག	Chongsamling སྐྱོངས་བསམ་གླིང་སྤྱི་འོག
Dagana དར་དཀར་ན་རྫོང་ཁག	Lhamoi Zingkha ལྷ་མོའི་རྫིང་ཁ་རྒེད་འོག	Lhamoidzingkha ལྷ་མོའི་རྫིང་ཁ་སྤྱི་འོག
Dagana དར་དཀར་ན་རྫོང་ཁག	Lhamoi Zingkha ལྷ་མོའི་རྫིང་ཁ་རྒེད་འོག	Loongilsa རླུང་བསིལ་ས་སྤྱི་འོག
Dagana དར་དཀར་ན་རྫོང་ཁག	Lhamoi Zingkha ལྷ་མོའི་རྫིང་ཁ་རྒེད་འོག	Kuendrelthang ཀུན་འབྲལ་ཐང་སྤྱི་འོག
Dagana དར་དཀར་ན་རྫོང་ཁག	Nichula ནི་ཅུ་ལ་རྒེད་འོག	Dramzekesa བྲམ་ཟེ་སྐྱེས་ས་སྤྱི་འོག
Dagana དར་དཀར་ན་རྫོང་ཁག	Nichula ནི་ཅུ་ལ་རྒེད་འོག	Yarpheling ཡར་འཕེལ་གླིང་སྤྱི་འོག
Dagana དར་དཀར་ན་རྫོང་ཁག	Nichula ནི་ཅུ་ལ་རྒེད་འོག	Damchhunang དམ་ཆུ་ནང་སྤྱི་འོག
Dagana དར་དཀར་ན་རྫོང་ཁག	Nichula ནི་ཅུ་ལ་རྒེད་འོག	Dangreyboog དྭངས་རས་སྦུག་སྤྱི་འོག
Dagana དར་དཀར་ན་རྫོང་ཁག	Nichula ནི་ཅུ་ལ་རྒེད་འོག	Gangtogkha སྒང་ཏོག་ཁ་སྤྱི་འོག
Dagana དར་དཀར་ན་རྫོང་ཁག	Trashiding བཀྲིས་ལྡིང་རྒེད་འོག	Shamdolay གཤམ་དོ་ལེ་སྤྱི་འོག
Dagana དར་དཀར་ན་རྫོང་ཁག	Trashiding བཀྲིས་ལྡིང་རྒེད་འོག	Tashiding བཀྲིས་ལྡིང་སྤྱི་འོག
Dagana དར་དཀར་ན་རྫོང་ཁག	Trashiding བཀྲིས་ལྡིང་རྒེད་འོག	Namchagla གནམ་ལྕགས་ལ་སྤྱི་འོག
Dagana དར་དཀར་ན་རྫོང་ཁག	Trashiding བཀྲིས་ལྡིང་རྒེད་འོག	Norbuling ནོར་བུ་གླིང་སྤྱི་འོག
Dagana དར་དཀར་ན་རྫོང་ཁག	Trashiding བཀྲིས་ལྡིང་རྒེད་འོག	Gangyab སྒང་རྒྱབ་སྤྱི་འོག
Dagana དར་དཀར་ན་རྫོང་ཁག	Tsangkha གཙང་ཁ་རྒེད་འོག	Gelegchhu དགེ་ལེགས་ཆུ་སྤྱི་འོག
Dagana དར་དཀར་ན་རྫོང་ཁག	Tsangkha གཙང་ཁ་རྒེད་འོག	Tsangkha གཙང་ཁ་སྤྱི་འོག
Dagana དར་དཀར་ན་རྫོང་ཁག	Tsangkha གཙང་ཁ་རྒེད་འོག	Zinchila ཟིན་ཅི་ལ་སྤྱི་འོག
Dagana དར་དཀར་ན་རྫོང་ཁག	Tsangkha གཙང་ཁ་རྒེད་འོག	Goongpa Soomchu གུང་པ་སུམ་ཅུ་སྤྱི་འོག
Dagana དར་དཀར་ན་རྫོང་ཁག	Tsangkha གཙང་ཁ་རྒེད་འོག	Pateykha པ་ཏེ་ཁ་སྤྱི་འོག
Dagana དར་དཀར་ན་རྫོང་ཁག	Tsendagang བཙན་མདའ་སྒང་རྒེད་འོག	Tsendagang བཙན་མདའ་སྒང་སྤྱི་འོག
Dagana དར་དཀར་ན་རྫོང་ཁག	Tsendagang བཙན་མདའ་སྒང་རྒེད་འོག	Gangzur Maed སྒང་ཟུར་སྟོད་སྤྱི་འོག
Dagana དར་དཀར་ན་རྫོང་ཁག	Tsendagang བཙན་མདའ་སྒང་རྒེད་འོག	Gangzur Toed སྒང་ཟུར་སྨད་སྤྱི་འོག
Dagana དར་དཀར་ན་རྫོང་ཁག	Tsendagang བཙན་མདའ་སྒང་རྒེད་འོག	Norbuzingkha ནོར་བུ་ཞིང་ཁ་སྤྱི་འོག
Dagana དར་དཀར་ན་རྫོང་ཁག	Tsendagang བཙན་མདའ་སྒང་རྒེད་འོག	Samarchu ས་མར་ཆུ་སྤྱི་འོག
Dagana དར་དཀར་ན་རྫོང་ཁག	Tseza བརྩེ་ཟ་རྒེད་འོག	Pelling དཔལ་གླིང་སྤྱི་འོག
Dagana དར་དཀར་ན་རྫོང་ཁག	Tseza བརྩེ་ཟ་རྒེད་འོག	Tashigang བཀྲིས་སྒང་སྤྱི་འོག
Dagana དར་དཀར་ན་རྫོང་ཁག	Tseza བརྩེ་ཟ་རྒེད་འོག	Samaed ས་སྨད་སྤྱི་འོག
Dagana དར་དཀར་ན་རྫོང་ཁག	Tseza བརྩེ་ཟ་རྒེད་འོག	Karlingzingkha དཀར་གླིང་རྗིང་ཁ་སྤྱི་འོག
Dagana དར་དཀར་ན་རྫོང་ཁག	Tseza བརྩེ་ཟ་རྒེད་འོག	Tsangleykha གཙང་ལེགས་ཁ་སྤྱི་འོག

=== Gasa District ===
Dzongkhag	Gewog	Chiwog
Gasa མགར་ས་རྫོང་ཁག	Khamaed ཁ་སྨད་རྒེད་འོག	Gayza Zomina དགེ་ཟ་བཟོ་མི་ན་སྤྱི་འོག
Gasa མགར་ས་རྫོང་ཁག	Khamaed ཁ་སྨད་རྒེད་འོག	Jabisa རྒྱ་སྦིས་ས་སྤྱི་འོག
Gasa མགར་ས་རྫོང་ཁག	Khamaed ཁ་སྨད་རྒེད་འོག	Damji དྭངསམ་སྦྱིས་སྤྱི་འོག
Gasa མགར་ས་རྫོང་ཁག	Khamaed ཁ་སྨད་རྒེད་འོག	Barsha Panikong བར་ཤ་སྤ་ནི་སྐོང་སྤྱི་འོག
Gasa མགར་ས་རྫོང་ཁག	Khamaed ཁ་སྨད་རྒེད་འོག	Khailog Tashithang ཁའི་ལོག་ལྟར་ཤིང་ཐང་སྤྱི་འོག
Gasa མགར་ས་རྫོང་ཁག	Khatoed ཁ་སྟོད་རྒེད་འོག	Chhogley Phulakha ཕྱོགས་ལས་ཕུ་ལ་ཁ་སྤྱི་འོག
Gasa མགར་ས་རྫོང་ཁག	Khatoed ཁ་སྟོད་རྒེད་འོག	Mani མ་ནི་སྤྱི་འོག
Gasa མགར་ས་རྫོང་ཁག	Khatoed ཁ་སྟོད་རྒེད་འོག	Baychhu Tshedpgang སྦས་ཆུ་ཚདཔ་སྒང་སྤྱི་འོག
Gasa མགར་ས་རྫོང་ཁག	Khatoed ཁ་སྟོད་རྒེད་འོག	Tsheringkha ཚེ་རིང་ཁ་སྤྱི་འོག
Gasa མགར་ས་རྫོང་ཁག	Khatoed ཁ་སྟོད་རྒེད་འོག	Rimi རི་མི་སྤྱི་འོག
Gasa མགར་ས་རྫོང་ཁག	Laya ལ་ཡ་རྒེད་འོག	Gayza Lunggo རྒྱལ་ཟ་ལུང་སྒོ་སྤྱི་འོག
Gasa མགར་ས་རྫོང་ཁག	Laya ལ་ཡ་རྒེད་འོག	Chongra Loobcha སྐྱོང་ར་ལུབ་ལྕགས་སྤྱི་འོག
Gasa མགར་ས་རྫོང་ཁག	Laya ལ་ཡ་རྒེད་འོག	Neylug གནས་ལུགས་སྤྱི་འོག
Gasa མགར་ས་རྫོང་ཁག	Laya ལ་ཡ་རྒེད་འོག	Pazhi པ་གཞི་སྤྱི་འོག
Gasa མགར་ས་རྫོང་ཁག	Laya ལ་ཡ་རྒེད་འོག	Toedkor སྟོད་སྐོར་སྤྱི་འོག
Gasa མགར་ས་རྫོང་ཁག	Lunana ལུང་ནག་ན་རྒེད་འོག	Raminang Uesana ར་མི་ནང་དབུས་ས་ནང་སྤྱི་འོག
Gasa མགར་ས་རྫོང་ཁག	Lunana ལུང་ནག་ན་རྒེད་འོག	Shang Threlga Wachey གཤང་འཕྲལ་ག་ཝ་བཅས་སྤྱི་འོག
Gasa མགར་ས་རྫོང་ཁག	Lunana ལུང་ནག་ན་རྒེད་འོག	Lhedi ལྷད་དི་སྤྱི་འོག
Gasa མགར་ས་རྫོང་ཁག	Lunana ལུང་ནག་ན་རྒེད་འོག	Tshozhong མཚོ་གཞོང་སྤྱི་འོག
Gasa མགར་ས་རྫོང་ཁག	Lunana ལུང་ནག་ན་རྒེད་འོག	Thangza Toenchoe ཐངས་ཟ་བསྟན་བཅོས་སྤྱི་འོག

=== Haa District ===
Dzongkhag	Gewog	Chiwog
Haa ཧཱ་རྫོང་ཁག	Bji སྦྱིས་རྒེད་འོག	Choompa Jamgoen ཅུམ་པ་བྱམས་དགོན་སྤྱི་འོག
Haa ཧཱ་རྫོང་ཁག	Bji སྦྱིས་རྒེད་འོག	Gyensa Tokey རྒྱན་ས་ལྟོ་ཀེ་སྤྱི་འོག
Haa ཧཱ་རྫོང་ཁག	Bji སྦྱིས་རྒེད་འོག	Chenpa Geychhukha ཅེན་པ་དགེ་ཆུ་ཁ་སྤྱི་འོག
Haa ཧཱ་རྫོང་ཁག	Bji སྦྱིས་རྒེད་འོག	Tsenka Taloong བཙན་ཀ་རྟ་ལུང་སྤྱི་འོག
Haa ཧཱ་རྫོང་ཁག	Bji སྦྱིས་རྒེད་འོག	Yangthang ཡངས་ཐང་སྤྱི་འོག
Haa ཧཱ་རྫོང་ཁག	Gakiling དགའ་སྐྱིད་གླིང་རྒེད་འོག	Dorithasa Kowkha Yangtse རྡོ་རི་མཐའ་ས་ཀོཝ་ཁ་ཡང་རྩེ་སྤྱི་འོག
Haa ཧཱ་རྫོང་ཁག	Gakiling དགའ་སྐྱིད་གླིང་རྒེད་འོག	Rangtse Tanga Yokha རང་རྩེ་རྟ་ང་ཡོ་ཁ་སྤྱི་འོག
Haa ཧཱ་རྫོང་ཁག	Gakiling དགའ་སྐྱིད་གླིང་རྒེད་འོག	Saidzong Thangdokha སའི་རྫོང་ཐང་རྡོ་ཁ་སྤྱི་འོག
Haa ཧཱ་རྫོང་ཁག	Gakiling དགའ་སྐྱིད་གླིང་རྒེད་འོག	Phootsena Ngatse ཕུ་རྩེ་ན་ང་རྩེ་སྤྱི་འོག
Haa ཧཱ་རྫོང་ཁག	Gakiling དགའ་སྐྱིད་གླིང་རྒེད་འོག	Fentena Sertena ཕན་ཏེ་ན་སེར་ཏེ་ན་སྤྱི་འོག
Haa ཧཱ་རྫོང་ཁག	Katsho སྐར་ཚོགས་རྒེད་འོག	Bali Mombitshokha བ་ལི་མོམ་སྦི་མཚོ་ཁ་སྤྱི་འོག
Haa ཧཱ་རྫོང་ཁག	Katsho སྐར་ཚོགས་རྒེད་འོག	Kargoen Hatam སྐར་དགོན་འ་ཏམ་སྤྱི་འོག
Haa ཧཱ་རྫོང་ཁག	Katsho སྐར་ཚོགས་རྒེད་འོག	Dragding Karjena བྲག་སྡིང་དཀར་རྒྱན་ན་སྤྱི་འོག
Haa ཧཱ་རྫོང་ཁག	Katsho སྐར་ཚོགས་རྒེད་འོག	Ingo Pharikha ཨིན་སགོ་ཕ་རི་ཁ་སྤྱི་འོག
Haa ཧཱ་རྫོང་ཁག	Katsho སྐར་ཚོགས་རྒེད་འོག	Wangtsa ཝང་རྩ་སྤྱི་འོག
Haa ཧཱ་རྫོང་ཁག	Samar ས་དམར་རྒེད་འོག	Dorikha Langjogang རྡོ་རི་ཁ་གླང་འབྱོག་སྒང་སྤྱི་འོག
Haa ཧཱ་རྫོང་ཁག	Samar ས་དམར་རྒེད་འོག	Langpa Norbugang གླང་པ་ནོར་བུ་སྒང་སྤྱི་འོག
Haa ཧཱ་རྫོང་ཁག	Samar ས་དམར་རྒེད་འོག	Balamnang བ་ལམ་ནང་སྤྱི་འོག
Haa ཧཱ་རྫོང་ཁག	Samar ས་དམར་རྒེད་འོག	Jenkanang Pudunang རྒྱན་ག་ནང་སྤུ་འདུ་ནང་སྤྱི་འོག
Haa ཧཱ་རྫོང་ཁག	Samar ས་དམར་རྒེད་འོག	Sharri ཤར་རི་སྤྱི་འོག
Haa ཧཱ་རྫོང་ཁག	Sangbay གསང་སྦས་རྒེད་འོག	Mochhu མོ་ཆུ་སྤྱི་འོག
Haa ཧཱ་རྫོང་ཁག	Sangbay གསང་སྦས་རྒེད་འོག	Nakha Tashigang ན་ཀ་བཀྲིས་སྒང་སྤྱི་འོག
Haa ཧཱ་རྫོང་ཁག	Sangbay གསང་སྦས་རྒེད་འོག	Anakha Shepji ཨ་ན་ཁ་ཤེསཔ་སྦྱིས་སྤྱི་འོག
Haa ཧཱ་རྫོང་ཁག	Sangbay གསང་སྦས་རྒེད་འོག	Shema Yaba ཤེས་མ་ཡ་བཱ་སྤྱི་འོག
Haa ཧཱ་རྫོང་ཁག	Sangbay གསང་སྦས་རྒེད་འོག	Sangbay Ama གསང་སྦས་ཨ་མ་སྤྱི་འོག
Haa ཧཱ་རྫོང་ཁག	Uesu དབུས་སུ་རྒེད་འོག	Betso Doomchhog སྦས་གཙོ་དུམ་མཆོག་སྤྱི་འོག
Haa ཧཱ་རྫོང་ཁག	Uesu དབུས་སུ་རྒེད་འོག	Geyruna Karnag དགེ་རུན་དཀར་ནག་སྤྱི་འོག
Haa ཧཱ་རྫོང་ཁག	Uesu དབུས་སུ་རྒེད་འོག	Pajekha Sangkiri སྤ་རྗེ་ཁ་གསང་ཀི་རི་སྤྱི་འོག
Haa ཧཱ་རྫོང་ཁག	Uesu དབུས་སུ་རྒེད་འོག	Kipri Tagchhu སྐིདཔ་རི་སྟག་ཆུ་སྤྱི་འོག
Haa ཧཱ་རྫོང་ཁག	Uesu དབུས་སུ་རྒེད་འོག	Tshaphel Tsiloongkha ཚྭ་འཕེལ་རྩི་ལུང་ཁ་སྤྱི་འོག

=== Lhuntse District ===
Dzongkhag	Gewog	Chiwog
Lhuentse ལྷུན་རྩེ་རྫོང་ཁག	Gangzur སྒང་ཟུར་རྒེད་འོག	Ney གནས་སྤྱི་འོག
Lhuentse ལྷུན་རྩེ་རྫོང་ཁག	Gangzur སྒང་ཟུར་རྒེད་འོག	Kyidloong Somshing སྐྱིད་ལུང་སོམ་ཤིང་སྤྱི་འོག
Lhuentse ལྷུན་རྩེ་རྫོང་ཁག	Gangzur སྒང་ཟུར་རྒེད་འོག	Thrima Shawa Zhamling ཁྲི་མ་ཤ་ཝ་ཞམ་གླིང་སྤྱི་འོག
Lhuentse ལྷུན་རྩེ་རྫོང་ཁག	Gangzur སྒང་ཟུར་རྒེད་འོག	Nyimzhong Tongling ཉིམ་གཞོང་སྟོང་གླིང་སྤྱི་འོག
Lhuentse ལྷུན་རྩེ་རྫོང་ཁག	Gangzur སྒང་ཟུར་རྒེད་འོག	Jang Ngar བྱང་ངར་སྤྱི་འོག
Lhuentse ལྷུན་རྩེ་རྫོང་ཁག	Khoma མཁོ་མ་རྒེད་འོག	Rolmateng Tsangngo རོལ་མ་སྟེངས་གཙང་ངོ་སྤྱི་འོག
Lhuentse ལྷུན་རྩེ་རྫོང་ཁག	Khoma མཁོ་མ་རྒེད་འོག	Berpa Khoma བེར་པ་མཁོ་མ་སྤྱི་འོག
Lhuentse ལྷུན་རྩེ་རྫོང་ཁག	Khoma མཁོ་མ་རྒེད་འོག	Babtong Dragteng བབ་སྟོང་གྲག་སྟེང་སྤྱི་འོག
Lhuentse ལྷུན་རྩེ་རྫོང་ཁག	Khoma མཁོ་མ་རྒེད་འོག	Gangla Kholma སྒང་ལ་འཁོལ་མ་སྤྱི་འོག
Lhuentse ལྷུན་རྩེ་རྫོང་ཁག	Khoma མཁོ་མ་རྒེད་འོག	Pangkhar སབང་མཁར་སྤྱི་འོག
Lhuentse ལྷུན་རྩེ་རྫོང་ཁག	Jarey རྒྱ་རས་རྒེད་འོག	Yumchhe ཡུམ་ཆེ་སྤྱི་འོག
Lhuentse ལྷུན་རྩེ་རྫོང་ཁག	Jarey རྒྱ་རས་རྒེད་འོག	Kharchung མཁར་ཅུང་སྤྱི་འོག
Lhuentse ལྷུན་རྩེ་རྫོང་ཁག	Jarey རྒྱ་རས་རྒེད་འོག	Ladrong ལ་གྲོང་སྤྱི་འོག
Lhuentse ལྷུན་རྩེ་རྫོང་ཁག	Jarey རྒྱ་རས་རྒེད་འོག	Artobi Ngangngae ཨར་ཏོ་སྦིས་ངང་ངེས་སྤྱི་འོག
Lhuentse ལྷུན་རྩེ་རྫོང་ཁག	Jarey རྒྱ་རས་རྒེད་འོག	Yabi Zangkhar ཡ་སྦིས་བཟང་མཁར་སྤྱི་འོག
Lhuentse ལྷུན་རྩེ་རྫོང་ཁག	Kurtoed ཀུར་སྟོད་རྒེད་འོག	Jasabi Ugyenphoog རྒྱ་ས་སྦི་ཨོ་རྒྱན་ཕུག་སྤྱི་འོག
Lhuentse ལྷུན་རྩེ་རྫོང་ཁག	Kurtoed ཀུར་སྟོད་རྒེད་འོག	Chagdzom Chhusa ལྕགས་འཛོམས་ཆུ་ས་སྤྱི་འོག
Lhuentse ལྷུན་རྩེ་རྫོང་ཁག	Kurtoed ཀུར་སྟོད་རྒེད་འོག	Tangroong Wawel སྟང་རུང་ཝ་ཝལ་སྤྱི་འོག
Lhuentse ལྷུན་རྩེ་རྫོང་ཁག	Kurtoed ཀུར་སྟོད་རྒེད་འོག	Dungkar གདུང་དཀར་སྤྱི་འོག
Lhuentse ལྷུན་རྩེ་རྫོང་ཁག	Kurtoed ཀུར་སྟོད་རྒེད་འོག	Tabi རྟ་སྦིས་སྤྱི་འོག
Lhuentse ལྷུན་རྩེ་རྫོང་ཁག	Menbi སྨན་སྦིས་རྒེད་འོག	Nyaibi Zhungkhar ཉའི་སྦིས་གཞུང་མཁར་སྤྱི་འོག
Lhuentse ལྷུན་རྩེ་རྫོང་ཁག	Menbi སྨན་སྦིས་རྒེད་འོག	Maenjabi སྨན་བྱ་སྦིས་སྤྱི་འོག
Lhuentse ལྷུན་རྩེ་རྫོང་ཁག	Menbi སྨན་སྦིས་རྒེད་འོག	Tagmochhu Gorgan སྟག་མོ་ཆུ་སྒོར་སྒན་སྤྱི་འོག
Lhuentse ལྷུན་རྩེ་རྫོང་ཁག	Menbi སྨན་སྦིས་རྒེད་འོག	Phagidoong ཕག་གི་དུང་སྤྱི་འོག
Lhuentse ལྷུན་རྩེ་རྫོང་ཁག	Menbi སྨན་སྦིས་རྒེད་འོག	Kamdhar Moormo སྐམ་རྡར་མུར་མོ་སྤྱི་འོག
Lhuentse ལྷུན་རྩེ་རྫོང་ཁག	Metsho སྨད་མཚོ་རྒེད་འོག	Oonggar ཨུང་སྒར་སྤྱི་འོག
Lhuentse ལྷུན་རྩེ་རྫོང་ཁག	Metsho སྨད་མཚོ་རྒེད་འོག	Zhongmaed གཞོང་སྨད་སྤྱི་འོག
Lhuentse ལྷུན་རྩེ་རྫོང་ཁག	Metsho སྨད་མཚོ་རྒེད་འོག	Bamdhir Yurung བང་འདིར་གཡུ་རུང་སྤྱི་འོག
Lhuentse ལྷུན་རྩེ་རྫོང་ཁག	Metsho སྨད་མཚོ་རྒེད་འོག	Gortshom Tshangthromaed སྒོར་ཚོམས་ཚང་ཁྲོམ་སྨད་སྤྱི་འོག
Lhuentse ལྷུན་རྩེ་རྫོང་ཁག	Metsho སྨད་མཚོ་རྒེད་འོག	Obi Tongthrong ཨོ་སྦི་སྟོང་འཕྲོང་སྤྱི་འོག
Lhuentse ལྷུན་རྩེ་རྫོང་ཁག	Minjay སྨིན་རྒྱས་རྒེད་འོག	Amdrangchhu Zham ཨམ་བྲངས་ཆུ་ཞམ་སྤྱི་འོག
Lhuentse ལྷུན་རྩེ་རྫོང་ཁག	Minjay སྨིན་རྒྱས་རྒེད་འོག	Chusa Legshogang ཅུ་ས་ལེགས་ཤོ་སྒང་སྤྱི་འོག
Lhuentse ལྷུན་རྩེ་རྫོང་ཁག	Minjay སྨིན་རྒྱས་རྒེད་འོག	Draaggong Jalang བྲག་སྒོང་བྱ་གླང་སྤྱི་འོག
Lhuentse ལྷུན་རྩེ་རྫོང་ཁག	Minjay སྨིན་རྒྱས་རྒེད་འོག	Boodur Kupinyalsa བུ་དུར་སྐུ་པི་ཉལ་ས་སྤྱི་འོག
Lhuentse ལྷུན་རྩེ་རྫོང་ཁག	Minjay སྨིན་རྒྱས་རྒེད་འོག	Minjey Wangzhing སྨིན་རྒྱས་དབང་ཞིང་སྤྱི་འོག
Lhuentse ལྷུན་རྩེ་རྫོང་ཁག	Tsenkhar སཙན་མཁར་རྒེད་འོག	Gonyid Wambur སྒོ་ཉིད་ཝམ་བུར་སྤྱི་འོག
Lhuentse ལྷུན་རྩེ་རྫོང་ཁག	Tsenkhar སཙན་མཁར་རྒེད་འོག	Domkhar Umling དོམ་མཁར་ཨུམ་གླིང་སྤྱི་འོག
Lhuentse ལྷུན་རྩེ་རྫོང་ཁག	Tsenkhar སཙན་མཁར་རྒེད་འོག	Dekaling Tshochhen བདེ་ཀ་གླིང་མཚོ་ཆེན་སྤྱི་འོག
Lhuentse ལྷུན་རྩེ་རྫོང་ཁག	Tsenkhar སཙན་མཁར་རྒེད་འོག	Autsho Chharbi ཨའུ་མཚོ་འཆར་སྦིས་སྤྱི་འོག
Lhuentse ལྷུན་རྩེ་རྫོང་ཁག	Tsenkhar སཙན་མཁར་རྒེད་འོག	Artobadeb Guendrang ཨར་ཏོ་བ་སྡེབ་དགུན་འབྲངས་སྤྱི་འོག

=== Mongar District ===
Dzongkhag	Gewog	Chiwog
Mongar མོང་སྒར་རྫོང་ཁག	Balam བ་ལམ་རྒེད་འོག	Khebishing མཁས་སྦི་ཤིང་སྤྱི་འོག
Mongar མོང་སྒར་རྫོང་ཁག	Balam བ་ལམ་རྒེད་འོག	Balam Morphu བ་ལམ་།མོར་ཕུ་སྤྱི་འོག
Mongar མོང་སྒར་རྫོང་ཁག	Balam བ་ལམ་རྒེད་འོག	Bahkaphai བཱ་ཀ་ཕའི་པ་སྤྱི་འོག
Mongar མོང་སྒར་རྫོང་ཁག	Balam བ་ལམ་རྒེད་འོག	Doongmanma Selkhar དུང་མན་མ་།གསལ་མཁར་སྤྱི་འོག
Mongar མོང་སྒར་རྫོང་ཁག	Balam བ་ལམ་རྒེད་འོག	Jadoong Yangbari བྱ་གདུང་།ཡངས་བ་རི་སྤྱི་འོག
Mongar མོང་སྒར་རྫོང་ཁག	Chaling ཅ་གླིང་རྒེད་འོག	Chhaling Dopang ཆ་གླིང་།རྡོ་སྤང་།སྤྱི་འོག
Mongar མོང་སྒར་རྫོང་ཁག	Chaling ཅ་གླིང་རྒེད་འོག	Chulabi བཅུ་ལ་སྦི་སྤྱི་འོག
Mongar མོང་སྒར་རྫོང་ཁག	Chaling ཅ་གླིང་རྒེད་འོག	Shebchi Yangthang ཤེབ་ཅི་།ཡངས་ཐང་སྤྱི་འོག
Mongar མོང་སྒར་རྫོང་ཁག	Chaling ཅ་གླིང་རྒེད་འོག	Pangthang Thempang སྤང་ཐང་།ཐེམ་སྤང་་སྤྱི་འོག
Mongar མོང་སྒར་རྫོང་ཁག	Chaling ཅ་གླིང་རྒེད་འོག	Wangmakhar Khalangji ཝང་མ་མཁར་།ཁ་ལང་སྦྱིས་སྤྱི་འོག
Mongar མོང་སྒར་རྫོང་ཁག	Chaskhar ལྕགས་ས་མཁར་རྒེད་འོག	Yangrapoongshing གཡང་ར་སྤུང་ཤིང་སྤྱི་འོག
Mongar མོང་སྒར་རྫོང་ཁག	Chaskhar ལྕགས་ས་མཁར་རྒེད་འོག	Kharnang Kheshingra མཁར་ནང་།ཁེ་ཤིང་ར་སྤྱི་འོག
Mongar མོང་སྒར་རྫོང་ཁག	Chaskhar ལྕགས་ས་མཁར་རྒེད་འོག	Doongsingma Pam དུང་སིང་མ་།སྤམ་སྤྱི་འོག
Mongar མོང་སྒར་རྫོང་ཁག	Chaskhar ལྕགས་ས་མཁར་རྒེད་འོག	Borphai Chagsakhar སྦོར་པའི་།ལྕགས་ས་མཁར་སྤྱི་འོག
Mongar མོང་སྒར་རྫོང་ཁག	Chaskhar ལྕགས་ས་མཁར་རྒེད་འོག	Yetong Jarshingpogtor ཡེ་སྟོང་།བྱར་ཤིང་སྤོག་ཏོར་སྤྱི་འོག
Mongar མོང་སྒར་རྫོང་ཁག	Drametse དགྲ་མེད་རྩེ་རྒེད་འོག	Serkhagphoog Yengkhartshing གསེར་ཁག་ཕུག་།ཡེངས་ཁར་ཚིང་སྤྱི་འོག
Mongar མོང་སྒར་རྫོང་ཁག	Drametse དགྲ་མེད་རྩེ་རྒེད་འོག	Dramedtse Shaphangma དགྲ་མེད་རྩེ་།ཤ་ཕང་མ་སྤྱི་འོག
Mongar མོང་སྒར་རྫོང་ཁག	Drametse དགྲ་མེད་རྩེ་རྒེད་འོག	Baging Shadang སྦ་གིང་།ཤ་གདངས་སྤྱི་འོག
Mongar མོང་སྒར་རྫོང་ཁག	Drametse དགྲ་མེད་རྩེ་རྒེད་འོག	Zangkhar ཟངས་མཁར་
Mongar མོང་སྒར་རྫོང་ཁག	Drametse དགྲ་མེད་རྩེ་རྒེད་འོག	Bikhar Thoongdari སྦི་མཁར་།ཐུང་ད་རི་སྤྱི་འོག
Mongar མོང་སྒར་རྫོང་ཁག	Drepong འབྲེས་སྤུངས་རྒེད་འོག	Boompazor Drepoong བུམ་པ་ཟོར་།འབྲེས་སྤུངས་པ་སྤྱི་འོག
Mongar མོང་སྒར་རྫོང་ཁག	Drepong འབྲེས་སྤུངས་རྒེད་འོག	Labtsa Shinggar ལབ་རྩ་།ཤིང་སྒར་སྤྱི་འོག
Mongar མོང་སྒར་རྫོང་ཁག	Drepong འབྲེས་སྤུངས་རྒེད་འོག	Bainangri Nyamla སྦའི་ནང་རི་།ཉམས་ལ་སྤྱི་འོག
Mongar མོང་སྒར་རྫོང་ཁག	Drepong འབྲེས་སྤུངས་རྒེད་འོག	Chhagsuzor Tsangkhar ཕྱགས་སུ་ཟོར་།གཙང་མཁར་སྤྱི་འོག
Mongar མོང་སྒར་རྫོང་ཁག	Drepong འབྲེས་སྤུངས་རྒེད་འོག	Zunglen བཟུང་ལེན་སྤྱི་འོག
Mongar མོང་སྒར་རྫོང་ཁག	Gongdue དགོངས་འདུས་རྒེད་འོག	Damkhar Weringla སྡམ་མཁར་།ཝེ་རིང་ལ་སྤྱི་འོག
Mongar མོང་སྒར་རྫོང་ཁག	Gongdue དགོངས་འདུས་རྒེད་འོག	Phadzong ཕ་རྫོང་པ་སྤྱི་འོག
Mongar མོང་སྒར་རྫོང་ཁག	Gongdue དགོངས་འདུས་རྒེད་འོག	Daagsa Kumadzong བདག་ས་།སྐུ་མ་རྫོང་སྤྱི་འོག
Mongar མོང་སྒར་རྫོང་ཁག	Gongdue དགོངས་འདུས་རྒེད་འོག	Pikari Yangbari སྤི་ཀ་རི་།ཡངས་སྦ་རི་སྤྱི་འོག
Mongar མོང་སྒར་རྫོང་ཁག	Gongdue དགོངས་འདུས་རྒེད་འོག	Baagla Dengkaling སྦག་ལ་།སྡེང་ཀ་གླིང་སྤྱི་འོག
Mongar མོང་སྒར་རྫོང་ཁག	Jurmey འགྱུར་མེད་རྒེད་འོག	Ngamphoog Sangkama ངམ་ཕུག་།སང་ཀ་མ་སྤྱི་འོག
Mongar མོང་སྒར་རྫོང་ཁག	Jurmey འགྱུར་མེད་རྒེད་འོག	Bilam Dangkila སྦིས་ལམ་།དངས་ཀྱི་ལ་སྤྱི་འོག
Mongar མོང་སྒར་རྫོང་ཁག	Jurmey འགྱུར་མེད་རྒེད་འོག	Moogtangkhar Tsangkhazor མུག་བསྟང་མཁར་།བཙང་ཁ་ཟོར་སྤྱི་འོག
Mongar མོང་སྒར་རྫོང་ཁག	Jurmey འགྱུར་མེད་རྒེད་འོག	Moodoongkhar Tselam མུ་དུང་མཁར་།རྩེ་ལམ་སྤྱི་འོག
Mongar མོང་སྒར་རྫོང་ཁག	Jurmey འགྱུར་མེད་རྒེད་འོག	Kognala Yaragla སྐོག་ན་ལ་།ཡ་རག་ལ་སྤྱི་འོག
Mongar མོང་སྒར་རྫོང་ཁག	Kengkhar སྐྱེངས་མཁར་རྒེད་འོག	Tongla Zitsibi སྟོང་ལ་།གཟི་རྩི་སྦིས་པ་སྤྱི་འོག
Mongar མོང་སྒར་རྫོང་ཁག	Kengkhar སྐྱེངས་མཁར་རྒེད་འོག	Dogtang Mooroong དོག་སྟང་།མུ་རུང་སྤྱི་འོག
Mongar མོང་སྒར་རྫོང་ཁག	Kengkhar སྐྱེངས་མཁར་རྒེད་འོག	Kyidpari Yuldarig སྐྱིད་པ་རི་།ཡུལ་ད་རིགས་པ་སྤྱི་འོག
Mongar མོང་སྒར་རྫོང་ཁག	Kengkhar སྐྱེངས་མཁར་རྒེད་འོག	Neykolog Warongborang གནས་ཀོ་ལོག་།ཝ་རོང་བོ་རང་སྤྱི་འོག
Mongar མོང་སྒར་རྫོང་ཁག	Kengkhar སྐྱེངས་མཁར་རྒེད་འོག	Olokid Tsalabi ཨོ་ལོ་སྐྱིད་།རྩལ་སྦིས་པ་སྤྱི་འོག
Mongar མོང་སྒར་རྫོང་ཁག	Kengkhar སྐྱེངས་མཁར་རྒེད་འོག	Phosothong Shingchongri ཕྭོ་སོ་མཐོང་།ཤིང་ལྕོང་རི་སྤྱི་འོག
Mongar མོང་སྒར་རྫོང་ཁག	Mongar མོང་སྒར་རྒེད་འོག	Themnangbi Kentongri ཐེམ་ནང་སྦིས་།ཀེ་སྟོང་རི་སྤྱི་འོག
Mongar མོང་སྒར་རྫོང་ཁག	Mongar མོང་སྒར་རྒེད་འོག	Koenbar Tagchhu ཀོན་བར་།ལྟག་ཆུ་སྤྱི་འོག
Mongar མོང་སྒར་རྫོང་ཁག	Mongar མོང་སྒར་རྒེད་འོག	Wengkhar Yagpoogang ཝེང་མཁར་།གཡག་སྤུ་བསྒང་པ་སྤྱི་འོག
Mongar མོང་སྒར་རྫོང་ཁག	Mongar མོང་སྒར་རྒེད་འོག	Kidekhar སྐྱིད་བདེ་མཁར་སྤྱི་འོག
Mongar མོང་སྒར་རྫོང་ཁག	Mongar མོང་སྒར་རྒེད་འོག	Phosorong ཕོ་སོ་རོང་སྤྱི་འོག
Mongar མོང་སྒར་རྫོང་ཁག	Mongar མོང་སྒར་རྒེད་འོག	Gyalpoizhing Wangling རྒྱལ་པོའི་ཞིང་།ཝང་གླིང་སྤྱི་འོག
Mongar མོང་སྒར་རྫོང་ཁག	Narang ན་རང་རྒེད་འོག	Khalong ཁ་ཀློང་སྤྱི་འོག
Mongar མོང་སྒར་རྫོང་ཁག	Narang ན་རང་རྒེད་འོག	Thrinangphu ཁྲི་ནང་ཕུ་སྤྱི་འོག
Mongar མོང་སྒར་རྫོང་ཁག	Narang ན་རང་རྒེད་འོག	Gomchhu སྒོམ་ཆུ་སྤྱི་འོག
Mongar མོང་སྒར་རྫོང་ཁག	Narang ན་རང་རྒེད་འོག	Narang Pangthang ན་རང་།སྤང་ཐང་སྤྱི་འོག
Mongar མོང་སྒར་རྫོང་ཁག	Narang ན་རང་རྒེད་འོག	Dongshoom Pangkhang གདོང་ཤུམ་།སྤང་ཁང་སྤྱི་འོག
Mongar མོང་སྒར་རྫོང་ཁག	Ngatshang སྔ་ཚང་རྒེད་འོག	Ngatshaang སྔ་ཚང་སྤྱི་འོག
Mongar མོང་སྒར་རྫོང་ཁག	Ngatshang སྔ་ཚང་རྒེད་འོག	Nyingala Phanasi སྙིང་དགའ་ལ་།ཕ་ན་སི་སྤྱི་འོག
Mongar མོང་སྒར་རྫོང་ཁག	Ngatshang སྔ་ཚང་རྒེད་འོག	Thoombari Zangdari ཐུམ་བ་རི་།ཟངས་ད་རི་སྤྱི་འོག
Mongar མོང་སྒར་རྫོང་ཁག	Ngatshang སྔ་ཚང་རྒེད་འོག	Phelshoob སྤེལ་ཤུབས་པ་སྤྱི་འོག
Mongar མོང་སྒར་རྫོང་ཁག	Ngatshang སྔ་ཚང་རྒེད་འོག	Yadi Yekhar ཡ་དི་།ཡེ་མཁར་སྤྱི་འོག
Mongar མོང་སྒར་རྫོང་ཁག	Saling ས་གླིང་རྒེད་འོག	Senggor གསེང་སྒོར་སྤྱི་འོག
Mongar མོང་སྒར་རྫོང་ཁག	Saling ས་གླིང་རྒེད་འོག	Saling ས་གླིང་སྤྱི་འོག
Mongar མོང་སྒར་རྫོང་ཁག	Saling ས་གླིང་རྒེད་འོག	Thridangbi ཁྲི་དང་སྦི་སྤྱི་འོག
Mongar མོང་སྒར་རྫོང་ཁག	Saling ས་གླིང་རྒེད་འོག	Tsenzabi Masangdaza བཙན་ཟ་སྦི་།མ་སྲང་ད་ཟ་སྤྱི་འོག
Mongar མོང་སྒར་རྫོང་ཁག	Saling ས་གླིང་རྒེད་འོག	Drogsar འབྲོག་གསར་སྤྱི་འོག
Mongar མོང་སྒར་རྫོང་ཁག	Saling ས་གླིང་རྒེད་འོག	Kalapang Resa ཀ་ལ་སྤང་།རེ་ས་པ་སྤྱི་འོག
Mongar མོང་སྒར་རྫོང་ཁག	Shermuhoong ཤེར་མུ་ཧཱུྃ་རྒེད་འོག	Soenakhar Yarab བསོད་ན་མཁར་།ཡ་རབ་སྤྱི་འོག
Mongar མོང་སྒར་རྫོང་ཁག	Shermuhoong ཤེར་མུ་ཧཱུྃ་རྒེད་འོག	Jabang Thueling རྒྱབ་སྒང་།མཐུ་གླིང་སྤྱི་འོག
Mongar མོང་སྒར་རྫོང་ཁག	Shermuhoong ཤེར་མུ་ཧཱུྃ་རྒེད་འོག	Malang Serzhong མ་ལང་།གསེར་གཞོང་སྤྱི་འོག
Mongar མོང་སྒར་རྫོང་ཁག	Shermuhoong ཤེར་མུ་ཧཱུྃ་རྒེད་འོག	Muhoong Shiling མུ་ཧཱུྃ་ཤི་གླིང་པ་སྤྱི་འོག
Mongar མོང་སྒར་རྫོང་ཁག	Shermuhoong ཤེར་མུ་ཧཱུྃ་རྒེད་འོག	Gangmoong སྒང་མུང་སྤྱི་འོག
Mongar མོང་སྒར་རྫོང་ཁག	Silambi སི་ལམ་སྦི་རྒེད་འོག	Wama ཝ་མ་སྤྱི་འོག
Mongar མོང་སྒར་རྫོང་ཁག	Silambi སི་ལམ་སྦི་རྒེད་འོག	Daag དག་སྤྱི་འོག
Mongar མོང་སྒར་རྫོང་ཁག	Silambi སི་ལམ་སྦི་རྒེད་འོག	Kadag Silambi ཀ་དག་།སི་ལམ་སྦི་སྤྱི་འོག
Mongar མོང་སྒར་རྫོང་ཁག	Silambi སི་ལམ་སྦི་རྒེད་འོག	Gyalong རྒྱལ་གོང་པ་སྤྱི་འོག
Mongar མོང་སྒར་རྫོང་ཁག	Silambi སི་ལམ་སྦི་རྒེད་འོག	Pang Nagor སྤང་།ན་སྒོར་སྤྱི་འོག
Mongar མོང་སྒར་རྫོང་ཁག	Thangrong ཐང་རོང་རྒེད་འོག	Changshing ལྕང་ཤིང་སྤྱི་འོག
Mongar མོང་སྒར་རྫོང་ཁག	Thangrong ཐང་རོང་རྒེད་འོག	Bauchhoeling Panglen སྦའུ་ཆོས་གླིང་།སྤང་ལེན་པ་སྤྱི་འོག
Mongar མོང་སྒར་རྫོང་ཁག	Thangrong ཐང་རོང་རྒེད་འོག	Atola ཨ་ཏོ་ལ་སྤྱི་འོག
Mongar མོང་སྒར་རྫོང་ཁག	Thangrong ཐང་རོང་རྒེད་འོག	Lingkhar གླིང་མཁར་པ་སྤྱི་འོག
Mongar མོང་སྒར་རྫོང་ཁག	Thangrong ཐང་རོང་རྒེད་འོག	Ngaru Pongtang ངར་རུ་།སྤོང་སྟང་
Mongar མོང་སྒར་རྫོང་ཁག	Tsakaling ཙ་ཀ་གླིང་རྒེད་འོག	Tagkhambi སྟག་ཁམས་སྦི་སྤྱི་འོག
Mongar མོང་སྒར་རྫོང་ཁག	Tsakaling ཙ་ཀ་གླིང་རྒེད་འོག	Kaling Thoomling ཀ་གླིང་།ཐུམ་གླིང་སྤྱི་འོག
Mongar མོང་སྒར་རྫོང་ཁག	Tsakaling ཙ་ཀ་གླིང་རྒེད་འོག	Nyartsi Tsakaling ཉར་རྩི་།ཙ་ཀ་གླིང་སྤྱི་འོག
Mongar མོང་སྒར་རྫོང་ཁག	Tsakaling ཙ་ཀ་གླིང་རྒེད་འོག	Drengling Horong དྲེང་གླིང་།ཧོ་རོང་སྤྱི་འོག
Mongar མོང་སྒར་རྫོང་ཁག	Tsakaling ཙ་ཀ་གླིང་རྒེད་འོག	Drongtoed Tormazhong གྲོང་སྟོད་།སྟོར་མ་གཞོང་སྤྱི་འོག
Mongar མོང་སྒར་རྫོང་ཁག	Tsamang རྩ་མང་རྒེད་འོག	Ganglapong Maed སྒང་ལ་སྤོངས་སྨད་
Mongar མོང་སྒར་རྫོང་ཁག	Tsamang རྩ་མང་རྒེད་འོག	Ganglapong Toed སྒང་ལ་སྤོངས་སྟོད་སྤྱི་འོག
Mongar མོང་སྒར་རྫོང་ཁག	Tsamang རྩ་མང་རྒེད་འོག	Baanjar བན་སྦྱར་སྤྱི་འོག
Mongar མོང་སྒར་རྫོང་ཁག	Tsamang རྩ་མང་རྒེད་འོག	Thuenmong Tokari མཐུན་མོང་།ཏོ་ཀ་རི་སྤྱི་འོག
Mongar མོང་སྒར་རྫོང་ཁག	Tsamang རྩ་མང་རྒེད་འོག	Drangmaling Nanggor དྲངམ་གླིང་།ནང་སྒོར་སྤྱི་འོག

=== Paro District ===
Dzongkhag	Gewog	Chiwog
Paro སྤ་རོ་རྫོང་ཁག	Dokar རྡོ་དཀར་རྒེད་འོག	Tenchhekha Tsiphoog བསྟན་ཆེ་ཁ་།རྕིས་ཕུག་སྤྱི་འོག
Paro སྤ་རོ་རྫོང་ཁག	Dokar རྡོ་དཀར་རྒེད་འོག	Goensakha Phuchhekha དགོན་ས་ཁ་།ཕུ་ཆེ་ཁ་སྤྱི་འོག
Paro སྤ་རོ་རྫོང་ཁག	Dokar རྡོ་དཀར་རྒེད་འོག	Mendrel Uesuna མན་དྲལ་།དབུས་སུ་ན་སྤྱི་འོག
Paro སྤ་རོ་རྫོང་ཁག	Dokar རྡོ་དཀར་རྒེད་འོག	Dawakha Tshongkha ཟླ་བ་ཁ་།ཚོང་ཁ་སྤྱི་འོག
Paro སྤ་རོ་རྫོང་ཁག	Dokar རྡོ་དཀར་རྒེད་འོག	Khamdraag Sali ཁམས་བྲག་།ས་ལི་སྤྱི་འོག
Paro སྤ་རོ་རྫོང་ཁག	Dopshari རྡོབ་ཤར་རི་རྒེད་འོག	Duezhi Jipa དུས་གཞི་།སྦྱིས་པ་སྤྱི་འོག
Paro སྤ་རོ་རྫོང་ཁག	Dopshari རྡོབ་ཤར་རི་རྒེད་འོག	Rinchhending Sharri རིན་ཆེན་ལྡིང་།ཤར་རི་སྤྱི་འོག
Paro སྤ་རོ་རྫོང་ཁག	Dopshari རྡོབ་ཤར་རི་རྒེད་འོག	Kempa Kuduphoog སྐྱེམ་པ་།སྐུ་འདུ་ཕུག་སྤྱི་འོག
Paro སྤ་རོ་རྫོང་ཁག	Dopshari རྡོབ་ཤར་རི་རྒེད་འོག	Jangsa Jooka བྱང་ས་།འཇུ་ཀ་སྤྱི་འོག
Paro སྤ་རོ་རྫོང་ཁག	Dopshari རྡོབ་ཤར་རི་རྒེད་འོག	Jizhigang སྦྱིས་གཞི་སྒང་སྤྱི་འོག
Paro སྤ་རོ་རྫོང་ཁག	Doteng རྡོ་སྟེང་རྒེད་འོག	Phooshar ཕུ་ཤར་སྤྱི་འོག
Paro སྤ་རོ་རྫོང་ཁག	Doteng རྡོ་སྟེང་རྒེད་འོག	Aatsho Phunoob ཨ་ཚོ་།ཕུ་ནུབ་སྤྱི་འོག
Paro སྤ་རོ་རྫོང་ཁག	Doteng རྡོ་སྟེང་རྒེད་འོག	Chhubar ཆུ་བར་སྤྱི་འོག
Paro སྤ་རོ་རྫོང་ཁག	Doteng རྡོ་སྟེང་རྒེད་འོག	Jabji Loogchhoed བྱག་སྦྱིས་།ལུག་མཆོད་སྤྱི་འོག
Paro སྤ་རོ་རྫོང་ཁག	Doteng རྡོ་སྟེང་རྒེད་འོག	Joogar Pachhu མཇུག་སྒར་།སྤ་ཆུ་སྤྱི་འོག
Paro སྤ་རོ་རྫོང་ཁག	Hungrel ཧཱུྃ་རལ་རྒེད་འོག	Gaupel དགའུ་སྤལ་སྤྱི་འོག
Paro སྤ་རོ་རྫོང་ཁག	Hungrel ཧཱུྃ་རལ་རྒེད་འོག	Hoongrelkha Jangsarbu ཧཱུྃ་རལ་ཁ་།བྱང་གསར་བུ་སྤྱི་འོག
Paro སྤ་རོ་རྫོང་ཁག	Hungrel ཧཱུྃ་རལ་རྒེད་འོག	Loongchhungna ལུང་ཆུང་ན་སྤྱི་འོག
Paro སྤ་རོ་རྫོང་ཁག	Hungrel ཧཱུྃ་རལ་རྒེད་འོག	Chhubjagkha ཆུ་བྱག་ཁ་སྤྱི་འོག
Paro སྤ་རོ་རྫོང་ཁག	Hungrel ཧཱུྃ་རལ་རྒེད་འོག	Goenkha དགོན་ཁ་སྤྱི་འོག
Paro སྤ་རོ་རྫོང་ཁག	Lamgong (Note: Nubri Chiwog was merged with other chios in Lamgong Gewog for election purposes.) ལམ་གོང་རྒེད་འོག	Chhukha ཆུ་ཁ་སྤྱི་འོག
Paro སྤ་རོ་རྫོང་ཁག	Lamgong ལམ་གོང་རྒེད་འོག	Tsendonang བཙན་དོ་ནང་སྤྱི་འོག
Paro སྤ་རོ་རྫོང་ཁག	Lamgong ལམ་གོང་རྒེད་འོག	Jagarthang རྒྱ་གར་ཐང་སྤྱི་འོག
Paro སྤ་རོ་རྫོང་ཁག	Lamgong ལམ་གོང་རྒེད་འོག	Gangjoog Kyidchhu སྒང་མཇུག་།སྐྱིད་ཆུ་སྤྱི་འོག
Paro སྤ་རོ་རྫོང་ཁག	Lamgong ལམ་གོང་རྒེད་འོག	Ngopa Shomo སྔོ་པ་།ཤོ་མོ་སྤྱི་འོག
Paro སྤ་རོ་རྫོང་ཁག	Lungnyi ལུང་གཉིས་རྒེད་འོག	Naemjog གནསམ་འབྱོག་སྤྱི་འོག
Paro སྤ་རོ་རྫོང་ཁག	Lungnyi ལུང་གཉིས་རྒེད་འོག	Jieu Woochhu བྱིའུ་།འུ་ཆུ་སྤྱི་འོག
Paro སྤ་རོ་རྫོང་ཁག	Lungnyi ལུང་གཉིས་རྒེད་འོག	Dzongdraag Gadraag རྫོང་བྲག་།དགའ་བྲག་སྤྱི་འོག
Paro སྤ་རོ་རྫོང་ཁག	Lungnyi ལུང་གཉིས་རྒེད་འོག	Baangdey བང་སྡེ་སྤྱི་འོག
Paro སྤ་རོ་རྫོང་ཁག	Lungnyi ལུང་གཉིས་རྒེད་འོག	Pangbisa སྤང་སྦིས་ས་སྤྱི་འོག
Paro སྤ་རོ་རྫོང་ཁག	Naja ན་རྒྱ་རྒེད་འོག	Bemphu Lingzhi Nagu བེམ་ཕུ་།གླིང་གཞི་།ན་དགུ་སྤྱི་འོག
Paro སྤ་རོ་རྫོང་ཁག	Naja ན་རྒྱ་རྒེད་འོག	Bueltikha Jagoen སྦུལ་ཏི་ཁ་།བྱ་དགོན་སྤྱི་འོག
Paro སྤ་རོ་རྫོང་ཁག	Naja ན་རྒྱ་རྒེད་འོག	Rangzhingang Tshebji རང་བཞིན་སྒང་།ཚེབས་སྦྱིས་སྤྱི་འོག
Paro སྤ་རོ་རྫོང་ཁག	Naja ན་རྒྱ་རྒེད་འོག	Wanakha Zursuna ཝ་ན་ཁ་།གྷཟུར་སུ་ན་སྤྱི་འོག
Paro སྤ་རོ་རྫོང་ཁག	Naja ན་རྒྱ་རྒེད་འོག	Jazhina Tsuengoen རྒྱ་གཞི་ན་།བཙུན་དགོན་སྤྱི་འོག
Paro སྤ་རོ་རྫོང་ཁག	Shapa ཤར་པ་རྒེད་འོག	Dochhoeten Neyphu རྡོ་མཆོད་རྟེན་།གནས་ཕུ་སྤྱི་འོག
Paro སྤ་རོ་རྫོང་ཁག	Shapa ཤར་པ་རྒེད་འོག	Drugyaldingkha Zhelngo འབྲུག་རྒྱལ་ལྡིང་ཁ་།ཞལ་ངོ་སྤྱི་འོག
Paro སྤ་རོ་རྫོང་ཁག	Shapa ཤར་པ་རྒེད་འོག	Bara Zhunggar བཱ་ར་།གཞུང་སྒར་སྤྱི་འོག
Paro སྤ་རོ་རྫོང་ཁག	Shapa ཤར་པ་རྒེད་འོག	Bjizhikha Phubarna སྦྱིས་གཞི་ཁ་།ཕུ་བར་ན་སྤྱི་འོག
Paro སྤ་རོ་རྫོང་ཁག	Shapa ཤར་པ་རྒེད་འོག	Chhukha Gangjoogkha ཆུ་ཁ་།སྒང་མཇུག་ཁ་སྤྱི་འོག
Paro སྤ་རོ་རྫོང་ཁག	Tsento བཙན་ཏོ་རྒེད་འོག	Soe Yagsa སྲོལ་།གཡག་ས་སྤྱི་འོག
Paro སྤ་རོ་རྫོང་ཁག	Tsento བཙན་ཏོ་རྒེད་འོག	Mitshig Shana མི་ཚིག་།ཤ་ན་སྤྱི་འོག
Paro སྤ་རོ་རྫོང་ཁག	Tsento བཙན་ཏོ་རྒེད་འོག	Chhungjey Zamsar ཆུང་རྗེས་།ཟམ་སར་སྤྱི་འོག
Paro སྤ་རོ་རྫོང་ཁག	Tsento བཙན་ཏོ་རྒེད་འོག	Nyamjey Phangdo ཉམས་རྗེས་།འཕང་དོག་སྤྱི་འོག
Paro སྤ་རོ་རྫོང་ཁག	Tsento བཙན་ཏོ་རྒེད་འོག	Nyechhu Shari ཉེས་ཆུ་།ཤར་རི་སྤྱི་འོག
Paro སྤ་རོ་རྫོང་ཁག	Wangchang ཝང་ལྕང་རྒེད་འོག	Gebtoed Olathang Tajoog གེབ་སྟོད་།ཨོ་ལ་ཐང་།རྟ་འཇུག་སྤྱི་འོག
Paro སྤ་རོ་རྫོང་ཁག	Wangchang ཝང་ལྕང་རྒེད་འོག	Changmedthangka Khangkhu སྤྱང་མེད་ཐང་ཁ་།ཁང་ཁུ་སྤྱི་འོག
Paro སྤ་རོ་རྫོང་ཁག	Wangchang ཝང་ལྕང་རྒེད་འོག	Dungkhar Namkhar དུང་དཀར་།གནམ་དཀར་སྤྱི་འོག
Paro སྤ་རོ་རྫོང་ཁག	Wangchang ཝང་ལྕང་རྒེད་འོག	Mendrel Nakha མན་དྲལ་།སྣ་ཁ་སྤྱི་འོག
Paro སྤ་རོ་རྫོང་ཁག	Wangchang ཝང་ལྕང་རྒེད་འོག	Changkhar Jangteyina ཅང་དཀར་།བྱང་སྟེ་ན་སྤྱི་འོག

=== Pemagatshel District ===
Dzongkhag	Gewog	Chiwog
Pema Gatshel པད་མ་དགའ་ཚལ་རྫོང་ཁག	Chhimoong ཕྱི་མུང་རྒེད་འོག	Chhimoong ཕྱི་མུང་སྤྱི་འོག
Pema Gatshel པད་མ་དགའ་ཚལ་རྫོང་ཁག	Chhimoong ཕྱི་མུང་རྒེད་འོག	Pangthang Redingla སྦང་ཐང་།རེ་སྡིང་ལ་སྤྱི་འོག
Pema Gatshel པད་མ་དགའ་ཚལ་རྫོང་ཁག	Chhimoong ཕྱི་མུང་རྒེད་འོག	Loongkholom ལུང་མཁོ་ལོམ་སྤྱི་འོག
Pema Gatshel པད་མ་དགའ་ཚལ་རྫོང་ཁག	Chhimoong ཕྱི་མུང་རྒེད་འོག	Nyasikhar ཉ་སི་མཁར་སྤྱི་འོག
Pema Gatshel པད་མ་དགའ་ཚལ་རྫོང་ཁག	Chhimoong ཕྱི་མུང་རྒེད་འོག	Chhiphoong ཕྱི་ཕུངས་པ་སྤྱི་འོག
Pema Gatshel པད་མ་དགའ་ཚལ་རྫོང་ཁག	Chokhorling ཆོས་འཁོར་གླིང་རྒེད་འོག	Kerong སྐྱེས་རོང་སྤྱི་འོག
Pema Gatshel པད་མ་དགའ་ཚལ་རྫོང་ཁག	Chokhorling ཆོས་འཁོར་གླིང་རྒེད་འོག	Dizama Shoguri དྲི་ཟ་མ་།ཤོ་གུ་རི་སྤྱི་འོག
Pema Gatshel པད་མ་དགའ་ཚལ་རྫོང་ཁག	Chokhorling ཆོས་འཁོར་གླིང་རྒེད་འོག	Yargyewoong ཡར་རྒྱས་འུང་སྤྱི་འོག
Pema Gatshel པད་མ་དགའ་ཚལ་རྫོང་ཁག	Chokhorling ཆོས་འཁོར་གླིང་རྒེད་འོག	Chhoekhorling Gazawong ཆོས་འཁོར་གླིང་།དགའ་ཟ་འོང་སྤྱི་འོག
Pema Gatshel པད་མ་དགའ་ཚལ་རྫོང་ཁག	Chokhorling ཆོས་འཁོར་གླིང་རྒེད་འོག	Arden ཨར་དྲན་སྤྱི་འོག
Pema Gatshel པད་མ་དགའ་ཚལ་རྫོང་ཁག	Chongshing ལྕོང་ཤིང་རྒེད་འོག	Guyoom Lanangzor མགུ་ཡུམ་།ལ་ནང་ཟོར་སྤྱི་འོག
Pema Gatshel པད་མ་དགའ་ཚལ་རྫོང་ཁག	Chongshing ལྕོང་ཤིང་རྒེད་འོག	Thongsa ཐོང་ས་སྤྱི་འོག
Pema Gatshel པད་མ་དགའ་ཚལ་རྫོང་ཁག	Chongshing ལྕོང་ཤིང་རྒེད་འོག	Maendi སྨན་དྲི་སྤྱི་འོག
Pema Gatshel པད་མ་དགའ་ཚལ་རྫོང་ཁག	Chongshing ལྕོང་ཤིང་རྒེད་འོག	Chongshing Jorphoong ལྕོང་ཤིང་།འབྲོར་ཕུང་སྤྱི་འོག
Pema Gatshel པད་མ་དགའ་ཚལ་རྫོང་ཁག	Chongshing ལྕོང་ཤིང་རྒེད་འོག	Kamri Yomzor སྐམ་རི་།གཡོམ་ཟོར་སྤྱི་འོག
Pema Gatshel པད་མ་དགའ་ཚལ་རྫོང་ཁག	Dechheling བདེ་ཆེན་གླིང་རྒེད་འོག	Doongchhilo Kholomri གདུང་ཆི་ལོ་།མཁོ་ལོམ་རི་སྤྱི་འོག
Pema Gatshel པད་མ་དགའ་ཚལ་རྫོང་ཁག	Dechheling བདེ་ཆེན་གླིང་རྒེད་འོག	Doongphu Shingchongri གདུང་ཕུ་།ཤིང་ལྕོང་རི་སྤྱི་འོག
Pema Gatshel པད་མ་དགའ་ཚལ་རྫོང་ཁག	Dechheling བདེ་ཆེན་གླིང་རྒེད་འོག	Namdagling རྣམ་དག་གླིང་སྤྱི་འོག
Pema Gatshel པད་མ་དགའ་ཚལ་རྫོང་ཁག	Dechheling བདེ་ཆེན་གླིང་རྒེད་འོག	Dechhenling Goenpawoong བདེ་ཆེན་གླིང་།དགོན་པ་འུང་པ་སྤྱི་འོག
Pema Gatshel པད་མ་དགའ་ཚལ་རྫོང་ཁག	Dechheling བདེ་ཆེན་གླིང་རྒེད་འོག	Goishing Ridzommo སགོའི་ཤིང་རི་འཛོམས་མོ་སྤྱི་འོག
Pema Gatshel པད་མ་དགའ་ཚལ་རྫོང་ཁག	Dechheling བདེ་ཆེན་གླིང་རྒེད་འོག	Bidoongri Yangmalashing སྦི་གབུང་རི་།གཡང་མ་ལ་ཤིང་སྤྱི་འོག
Pema Gatshel པད་མ་དགའ་ཚལ་རྫོང་ཁག	Dungmaed གདུང་སྨད་རྒེད་འོག	Serduwa གསེར་བསྡུ་ཝ་སྤྱི་འོག
Pema Gatshel པད་མ་དགའ་ཚལ་རྫོང་ཁག	Dungmaed གདུང་སྨད་རྒེད་འོག	Bangyuel འབངས་ཡུལ་སྤྱི་འོག
Pema Gatshel པད་མ་དགའ་ཚལ་རྫོང་ཁག	Dungmaed གདུང་སྨད་རྒེད་འོག	Lanyiri Thrumchoong ལ་ཉི་རི་།ཁྲུམས་ཅུང་སྤྱི་འོག
Pema Gatshel པད་མ་དགའ་ཚལ་རྫོང་ཁག	Dungmaed གདུང་སྨད་རྒེད་འོག	Dungmaed Zimzor གདུང་སྨད་གཟིམ་ཟོར་སྤྱི་འོག
Pema Gatshel པད་མ་དགའ་ཚལ་རྫོང་ཁག	Dungmaed གདུང་སྨད་རྒེད་འོག	Woongborang འུང་སྦོ་རང་སྤྱི་འོག
Pema Gatshel པད་མ་དགའ་ཚལ་རྫོང་ཁག	Khar མཁར་རྒེད་འོག	Khar Yagyur མཁར་།ཡ་འགྱུར་སྤྱི་འོག
Pema Gatshel པད་མ་དགའ་ཚལ་རྫོང་ཁག	Khar མཁར་རྒེད་འོག	Bongmaan སྦོང་མན་སྤྱི་འོག
Pema Gatshel པད་མ་དགའ་ཚལ་རྫོང་ཁག	Khar མཁར་རྒེད་འོག	Shinangri སི་ནང་རི་སྤྱི་འོག
Pema Gatshel པད་མ་དགའ་ཚལ་རྫོང་ཁག	Khar མཁར་རྒེད་འོག	Nagtseri Shemshem Tsebar གནག་རྩེ་རི་།ཤེམ་ཤེམ་།རྩེ་བར་སྤྱི་འོག
Pema Gatshel པད་མ་དགའ་ཚལ་རྫོང་ཁག	Khar མཁར་རྒེད་འོག	Khengzor Labar ཁེངས་ཟོར་།ལ་འབར་སྤྱི་འོག
Pema Gatshel པད་མ་དགའ་ཚལ་རྫོང་ཁག	Nanong ན་ནོང་རྒེད་འོག	Gashigkhar Tshatshi སྒ་ཤིག་མཁར་།ཚྭ་ཆི་སྤྱི་འོག
Pema Gatshel པད་མ་དགའ་ཚལ་རྫོང་ཁག	Nanong ན་ནོང་རྒེད་འོག	Nanong ན་ནོང་སྤྱི་འོག
Pema Gatshel པད་མ་དགའ་ཚལ་རྫོང་ཁག	Nanong ན་ནོང་རྒེད་འོག	Raling ར་གླིང་སྤྱི་འོག
Pema Gatshel པད་མ་དགའ་ཚལ་རྫོང་ཁག	Nanong ན་ནོང་རྒེད་འོག	Tokari ལྟོ་ཀ་རི་སྤྱི་འོག
Pema Gatshel པད་མ་དགའ་ཚལ་རྫོང་ཁག	Nanong ན་ནོང་རྒེད་འོག	Terphug Woongchhiloo གཏེར་ཕུག་།འུང་ཆི་ལུ་སྤྱི་འོག
Pema Gatshel པད་མ་དགའ་ཚལ་རྫོང་ཁག	Norbugang ནོར་བུ་སྒང་རྒེད་འོག	Norboogang Rinchhenzor ནོར་བུ་སྒང་།རིན་ཆེན་ཟོར་སྤྱི་འོག
Pema Gatshel པད་མ་དགའ་ཚལ་རྫོང་ཁག	Norbugang ནོར་བུ་སྒང་རྒེད་འོག	Nyingshingborang ཉིང་ཤིང་སྦོ་རང་སྤྱི་འོག
Pema Gatshel པད་མ་དགའ་ཚལ་རྫོང་ཁག	Norbugang ནོར་བུ་སྒང་རྒེད་འོག	Tshaelshingzor ཚལ་ཤིང་ཟོར་སྤྱི་འོག
Pema Gatshel པད་མ་དགའ་ཚལ་རྫོང་ཁག	Norbugang ནོར་བུ་སྒང་རྒེད་འོག	Gashari ག་ཤ་རི་སྤྱི་འོག
Pema Gatshel པད་མ་དགའ་ཚལ་རྫོང་ཁག	Norbugang ནོར་བུ་སྒང་རྒེད་འོག	Maenchhu Nganglam སྨན་ཆུ་།ངང་ལམ་སྤྱི་འོག
Pema Gatshel པད་མ་དགའ་ཚལ་རྫོང་ཁག	Shumar ཤུ་མར་རྒེད་འོག	Chongmashing Dagor ལྕོང་མ་ཤིང་།ཟླ་སྒོར་སྤྱི་འོག
Pema Gatshel པད་མ་དགའ་ཚལ་རྫོང་ཁག	Shumar ཤུ་མར་རྒེད་འོག	Goenpoong Shali དགོན་སྤུངས་།ཤ་ལི་སྤྱི་འོག
Pema Gatshel པད་མ་དགའ་ཚལ་རྫོང་ཁག	Shumar ཤུ་མར་རྒེད་འོག	Nangkor ནང་སྐོར་པ་སྤྱི་འོག
Pema Gatshel པད་མ་དགའ་ཚལ་རྫོང་ཁག	Shumar ཤུ་མར་རྒེད་འོག	Bartseri བར་རྩེ་རི་སྤྱི་འོག
Pema Gatshel པད་མ་དགའ་ཚལ་རྫོང་ཁག	Shumar ཤུ་མར་རྒེད་འོག	Khothagpa Yalang མགོ་འཐག་པ་།ཡ་ལང་པ་སྤྱི་འོག
Pema Gatshel པད་མ་དགའ་ཚལ་རྫོང་ཁག	Yurung ཡུ་རུང་རྒེད་འོག	Khangma ཁང་མ་སྤྱི་འོག
Pema Gatshel པད་མ་དགའ་ཚལ་རྫོང་ཁག	Yurung ཡུ་རུང་རྒེད་འོག	Bangdala སྦང་ད་ལ་སྤྱི་འོག
Pema Gatshel པད་མ་དགའ་ཚལ་རྫོང་ཁག	Yurung ཡུ་རུང་རྒེད་འོག	Wanglakho Thoonggo ཝང་ལ་མཁོ་།མཐང་སྒོ་སྤྱི་འོག
Pema Gatshel པད་མ་དགའ་ཚལ་རྫོང་ཁག	Yurung ཡུ་རུང་རྒེད་འོག	Doongsingma Thoongkhar གདུང་སིང་མ་།མཐུང་མཁར་སྤྱི་འོག
Pema Gatshel པད་མ་དགའ་ཚལ་རྫོང་ཁག	Yurung ཡུ་རུང་རྒེད་འོག	Khominang Yangkhar མཁོ་མི་ནང་།ཡང་མཁར་སྤྱི་འོག
Pema Gatshel པད་མ་དགའ་ཚལ་རྫོང་ཁག	Zobel བཟོ་སྦལ་རྒེད་འོག	Choongkhar Pangthangdaza ཁྱང་མཁར་།སྤང་ཐང་ད་ཟ་སྤྱི་འོག
Pema Gatshel པད་མ་དགའ་ཚལ་རྫོང་ཁག	Zobel བཟོ་སྦལ་རྒེད་འོག	Zobel བཟོ་སྦལ་སྤྱི་འོག
Pema Gatshel པད་མ་དགའ་ཚལ་རྫོང་ཁག	Zobel བཟོ་སྦལ་རྒེད་འོག	Ngangmalang Zorjoog ངང་མ་ལང་།ཟོར་འཇུག་སྤྱི་འོག
Pema Gatshel པད་མ་དགའ་ཚལ་རྫོང་ཁག	Zobel བཟོ་སྦལ་རྒེད་འོག	Raysinang རས་སི་ནང་པ་སྤྱི་འོག
Pema Gatshel པད་མ་དགའ་ཚལ་རྫོང་ཁག	Zobel བཟོ་སྦལ་རྒེད་འོག	Maan Tshelinggor མཱན་།ཚེ་གླིང་སྒོར་སྤྱི་འོག

=== Punakha District ===
Dzongkhag	Gewog	Chiwog
Punakha སྤུ་ན་ཁ་རྫོང་ཁག	Barp བརཔ་རྒེད་འོག	Chagsa ལྕགས་ས་སྤྱི་འོག
Punakha སྤུ་ན་ཁ་རྫོང་ཁག	Barp བརཔ་རྒེད་འོག	Sobsokha Yuwakha Zhikha སོབ་སོ་ཁ་གཡུ་བ་ཁ་གཞི་ཁ་སྤྱི་འོག
Punakha སྤུ་ན་ཁ་རྫོང་ཁག	Barp བརཔ་རྒེད་འོག	Usakha དབུ་ས་ཁ་སྤྱི་འོག
Punakha སྤུ་ན་ཁ་རྫོང་ཁག	Barp བརཔ་རྒེད་འོག	Tshogkorna ཚོགས་སྐོར་ན་སྤྱི་འོག
Punakha སྤུ་ན་ཁ་རྫོང་ཁག	Barp བརཔ་རྒེད་འོག	Gamakha Sebtokha སྒ་མ་ཁ་སེབ་རྟོ་ཁ་སྤྱི་འོག
Punakha སྤུ་ན་ཁ་རྫོང་ཁག	Chhubug ཆུ་སྦུག་རྒེད་འོག	Ngoedroobchhu དངོས་གྲུབ་ཅུ་སྤྱི་འོག
Punakha སྤུ་ན་ཁ་རྫོང་ཁག	Chhubug ཆུ་སྦུག་རྒེད་འོག	Bumtakha Tenpakha བུམ་ཏ་ཁ་བསྟན་པ་ཁ་སྤྱི་འོག
Punakha སྤུ་ན་ཁ་རྫོང་ཁག	Chhubug ཆུ་སྦུག་རྒེད་འོག	Jangwakha Sewala བྱང་བ་ཁ་སེ་བ་ལ་སྤྱི་འོག
Punakha སྤུ་ན་ཁ་རྫོང་ཁག	Chhubug ཆུ་སྦུག་རྒེད་འོག	Bali བ་ལི་སྤྱི་འོག
Punakha སྤུ་ན་ཁ་རྫོང་ཁག	Chhubug ཆུ་སྦུག་རྒེད་འོག	Yebisa ཡས་སྦིས་ས་སྤྱི་འོག
Punakha སྤུ་ན་ཁ་རྫོང་ཁག	Dzomi འཅོམས་མི་རྒེད་འོག	Gubji Tseykakha གུབ་ཇི་རྩེ་ཀ་ཁ་སྤྱི་འོག
Punakha སྤུ་ན་ཁ་རྫོང་ཁག	Dzomi འཅོམས་མི་རྒེད་འོག	Khilikhar Loongkha ཁྱིལ་ལི་ཁར་ལུང་ཁ་སྤྱི་འོག
Punakha སྤུ་ན་ཁ་རྫོང་ཁག	Dzomi འཅོམས་མི་རྒེད་འོག	Tanag Uesa རྟ་ནག་དབུ་ས་སྤྱི་འོག
Punakha སྤུ་ན་ཁ་རྫོང་ཁག	Dzomi འཅོམས་མི་རྒེད་འོག	Dzomisa Mendagang འཛོམས་མི་ས་མེ་མདའ་སྒང་སྤྱི་འོག
Punakha སྤུ་ན་ཁ་རྫོང་ཁག	Dzomi འཅོམས་མི་རྒེད་འོག	Jimithang སྦྱིས་མི་ཐང་སྤྱི་འོག
Punakha སྤུ་ན་ཁ་རྫོང་ཁག	Goenshari དགོམ་ཤ་རི་རྒེད་འོག	Goomgang སྒུམ་སྒང་སྤྱི་འོག
Punakha སྤུ་ན་ཁ་རྫོང་ཁག	Goenshari དགོམ་ཤ་རི་རྒེད་འོག	Yorbo ཡོར་སྦོ་སྤྱི་འོག
Punakha སྤུ་ན་ཁ་རྫོང་ཁག	Goenshari དགོམ་ཤ་རི་རྒེད་འོག	Draagchhukha བྲག་ཆུ་ཁ་སྤྱི་འོག
Punakha སྤུ་ན་ཁ་རྫོང་ཁག	Goenshari དགོམ་ཤ་རི་རྒེད་འོག	Sechaednang ས་བཅད་ནང་སྤྱི་འོག
Punakha སྤུ་ན་ཁ་རྫོང་ཁག	Goenshari དགོམ་ཤ་རི་རྒེད་འོག	Zhelngoesa གཞལ་ངོས་ས་སྤྱི་འོག
Punakha སྤུ་ན་ཁ་རྫོང་ཁག	Guma གུ་མ་རྒེད་འོག	Dochhukha Dzomlingthang Ritsa རྡོ་ཆུ་ག་འཛོམས་གླིང་ཐང་རི་རྩ་སྤྱི་འོག
Punakha སྤུ་ན་ཁ་རྫོང་ཁག	Guma གུ་མ་རྒེད་འོག	Lakhu Tshowogm ལ་ཁུ་མཚོ་འོགམ་སྤྱི་འོག
Punakha སྤུ་ན་ཁ་རྫོང་ཁག	Guma གུ་མ་རྒེད་འོག	Baymenang Phulingsoom Wangwakha སབེ་མི་ནང་པུ་ཕུ་གླིང་གསུམ་།ཝང་ཝ་ཁ་སྤྱི་འོག
Punakha སྤུ་ན་ཁ་རྫོང་ཁག	Guma གུ་མ་རྒེད་འོག	Changyuel Loongsilgang Tashijong ལྕང་ཡུལ་ལུང་བསིལ་སྒང་།བཀྲིས་ལྗོངས་སྤྱི་འོག
Punakha སྤུ་ན་ཁ་རྫོང་ཁག	Guma གུ་མ་རྒེད་འོག	Guma Wolakha གུ་མ་།ཝོ་ལ་ཁ་སྤྱི་འོག
Punakha སྤུ་ན་ཁ་རྫོང་ཁག	Kabisa དཀར་སྦི་ས་རྒེད་འོག	Chhoetennyingpo Uesarkha མཆོད་རྟེན་རྙིང་པོ་།གཡུས་གསར་ཁ་སྤྱི་འོག
Punakha སྤུ་ན་ཁ་རྫོང་ཁག	Kabisa དཀར་སྦི་ས་རྒེད་འོག	Heyloog Tongzhoognang ཧེ་ལུག་།སྟོང་བཞུགས་ནང་སྤྱི་འོག
Punakha སྤུ་ན་ཁ་རྫོང་ཁག	Kabisa དཀར་སྦི་ས་རྒེད་འོག	Agonang Zarbisa ཨ་སྒོ་ནང་།ཟར་སྦིས་ས་སྤྱི་འོག
Punakha སྤུ་ན་ཁ་རྫོང་ཁག	Kabisa དཀར་སྦི་ས་རྒེད་འོག	Peltari དཔལ་ལྟ་རི་སྤྱི་འོག
Punakha སྤུ་ན་ཁ་རྫོང་ཁག	Kabisa དཀར་སྦི་ས་རྒེད་འོག	Sirang Wakoodamchhi སི་རི་སྒང་།ཝ་རྐུ་འདམ་ཕྱི་སྤྱི་འོག
Punakha སྤུ་ན་ཁ་རྫོང་ཁག	Lingmukha གླིང་མུ་ཁ་རྒེད་འོག	Lingmukha གླིང་མུ་ཁ་སྤྱི་འོག
Punakha སྤུ་ན་ཁ་རྫོང་ཁག	Lingmukha གླིང་མུ་ཁ་རྒེད་འོག	Nabchhed ནགས་ཕྱད་སྤྱི་འོག
Punakha སྤུ་ན་ཁ་རྫོང་ཁག	Lingmukha གླིང་མུ་ཁ་རྒེད་འོག	Dompala དོམ་པ་ལ་སྤྱི་འོག
Punakha སྤུ་ན་ཁ་རྫོང་ཁག	Lingmukha གླིང་མུ་ཁ་རྒེད་འོག	Goomkarmo གུམ་སྐར་མོ་སྤྱི་འོག
Punakha སྤུ་ན་ཁ་རྫོང་ཁག	Lingmukha གླིང་མུ་ཁ་རྒེད་འོག	Oomtekha ཨུམ་ཏེ་ཁ་སྤྱི་འོག
Punakha སྤུ་ན་ཁ་རྫོང་ཁག	Shelnga Bjemi ཤེལ་རྔ་སྦྱེ་མི་རྒེད་འོག	Datong མདའ་སྟོང་སྤྱི་འོག
Punakha སྤུ་ན་ཁ་རྫོང་ཁག	Shelnga Bjemi ཤེལ་རྔ་སྦྱེ་མི་རྒེད་འོག	Thongbji མཐོང་སྦྱིས་པ་སྤྱི་འོག
Punakha སྤུ་ན་ཁ་རྫོང་ཁག	Shelnga Bjemi ཤེལ་རྔ་སྦྱེ་མི་རྒེད་འོག	Gangkha སྒང་ཁ་སྤྱི་འོག
Punakha སྤུ་ན་ཁ་རྫོང་ཁག	Shelnga Bjemi ཤེལ་རྔ་སྦྱེ་མི་རྒེད་འོག	Khubji Tshosa ཁུབ་ཇི་།མཚོ་ས་སྤྱི་འོག
Punakha སྤུ་ན་ཁ་རྫོང་ཁག	Shelnga Bjemi ཤེལ་རྔ་སྦྱེ་མི་རྒེད་འོག	Chongzhi Jarigang Jazhikha སྐྱོང་ཞི་།བྱ་རི་གང་།བྱ་ཞི་ཁ་སྤྱི་འོག
Punakha སྤུ་ན་ཁ་རྫོང་ཁག	Talog རྟ་ལོག་རྒེད་འོག	Loongnangkha ལུང་ནང་ཁ་སྤྱི་འོག
Punakha སྤུ་ན་ཁ་རྫོང་ཁག	Talog རྟ་ལོག་རྒེད་འོག	Dongkokhar Yonggu གདོང་ཀོ་ཁར་།ཡོངས་གུ་སྤྱི་འོག
Punakha སྤུ་ན་ཁ་རྫོང་ཁག	Talog རྟ་ལོག་རྒེད་འོག	Norbugang ནོར་བུ་སྒང་པ་སྤྱི་འོག
Punakha སྤུ་ན་ཁ་རྫོང་ཁག	Talog རྟ་ལོག་རྒེད་འོག	Talog རྟ་ལོག་སྤྱི་འོག
Punakha སྤུ་ན་ཁ་རྫོང་ཁག	Talog རྟ་ལོག་རྒེད་འོག	Gangthramo Labtsakha Soelwadrangsa སྒང་ཕྲ་མོ་།ལབ་རྩ་ཁ་།གསོལ་བ་དྲང་ས་སྤྱི་འོག
Punakha སྤུ་ན་ཁ་རྫོང་ཁག	Toepaisa སཏོད་པའི་ས་རྒེད་འོག	Bichhekha Yuelhamo སྦིས་ཆེ་ཁ་།ཡུལ་འ་མོ་སྤྱི་འོག
Punakha སྤུ་ན་ཁ་རྫོང་ཁག	Toepaisa སཏོད་པའི་ས་རྒེད་འོག	Damkhyi Rinakha དམ་ཁྱི་།རི་ན་ཁ་སྤྱི་འོག
Punakha སྤུ་ན་ཁ་རྫོང་ཁག	Toepaisa སཏོད་པའི་ས་རྒེད་འོག	Dochogla Maenchhuna རྡོ་ཅོག་ལ་།སྨན་ཆུ་ན་སྤྱི་འོག
Punakha སྤུ་ན་ཁ་རྫོང་ཁག	Toepaisa སཏོད་པའི་ས་རྒེད་འོག	Lemjakha Thinleygang ལེམ་བྱ་ཁ་།འཕྲིས་སྒང་སྤྱི་འོག
Punakha སྤུ་ན་ཁ་རྫོང་ཁག	Toepaisa སཏོད་པའི་ས་རྒེད་འོག	Goenmkha Mendrelgang དགོནམ་ཁ་།མན་དྲལ་སྒང་སྤྱི་འོག
Punakha སྤུ་ན་ཁ་རྫོང་ཁག	Toewang སྟོད་ཝང་རྒེད་འོག	Kewanang Tsachhuphu ཀེ་བ་ནང་།ཚྭ་ཆུ་ཕུ་སྤྱི་འོག
Punakha སྤུ་ན་ཁ་རྫོང་ཁག	Toewang སྟོད་ཝང་རྒེད་འོག	Tamigdamchhu Thangbji རྟ་མིག་དམ་ཆུ་།ཐང་སྦྱིས་པ་སྤྱི་འོག
Punakha སྤུ་ན་ཁ་རྫོང་ཁག	Toewang སྟོད་ཝང་རྒེད་འོག	Dawakha ཟླ་བ་ཁ་སྤྱི་འོག
Punakha སྤུ་ན་ཁ་རྫོང་ཁག	Toewang སྟོད་ཝང་རྒེད་འོག	Jibjo Yuesakha སྦྱིབ་ཇོ་།གཡུས་གསར་ཁ་སྤྱི་འོག
Punakha སྤུ་ན་ཁ་རྫོང་ཁག	Toewang སྟོད་ཝང་རྒེད་འོག	Tsephug Khawakha རྩེ་ཕུག་།ཁ་ཝ་ཁ་སྤྱི་འོག

=== Samdrup Jongkhar District ===
Dzongkhag	Gewog	Chiwog
Samdrup Jongkhar བསམ་གྲུབ་ལྗོངས་མཁར་རྫོང་ཁག	Dewathang དབེ་བ་ཐང་རྒེད་འོག	Martang མར་སྟངས་སྤྱི་འོག
Samdrup Jongkhar བསམ་གྲུབ་ལྗོངས་མཁར་རྫོང་ཁག	Dewathang དབེ་བ་ཐང་རྒེད་འོག	Domphoog Dungkharchhoeling སྡོམས་ཕུག་གདུང་དཀར་ཆོས་གླིང་སྤྱི་འོག
Samdrup Jongkhar བསམ་གྲུབ་ལྗོངས་མཁར་རྫོང་ཁག	Dewathang དབེ་བ་ཐང་རྒེད་འོག	Bangtsho བང་འཚོ་སྤྱི་འོག
Samdrup Jongkhar བསམ་གྲུབ་ལྗོངས་མཁར་རྫོང་ཁག	Dewathang དབེ་བ་ཐང་རྒེད་འོག	Chhenangri Rishor ཆེ་ནང་རི་རི་ཤོར་སྤྱི་འོག
Samdrup Jongkhar བསམ་གྲུབ་ལྗོངས་མཁར་རྫོང་ཁག	Dewathang དབེ་བ་ཐང་རྒེད་འོག	Rikhey རི་མཁས་སྤྱི་འོག
Samdrup Jongkhar བསམ་གྲུབ་ལྗོངས་མཁར་རྫོང་ཁག	Gomdar སྒམ་དར་རྒེད་འོག	Narphoong ནར་དཕུང་སྤྱི་འོག
Samdrup Jongkhar བསམ་གྲུབ་ལྗོངས་མཁར་རྫོང་ཁག	Gomdar སྒམ་དར་རྒེད་འོག	Gomdar Richhanglu སྒོམ་དར་རི་ཆང་ལུ་སྤྱི་འོག
Samdrup Jongkhar བསམ་གྲུབ་ལྗོངས་མཁར་རྫོང་ཁག	Gomdar སྒམ་དར་རྒེད་འོག	Khoyarpangthang Palroong མཁོ་གཡར་སྤང་ཐངས་དཔལ་རུང་སྤྱི་འོག
Samdrup Jongkhar བསམ་གྲུབ་ལྗོངས་མཁར་རྫོང་ཁག	Gomdar སྒམ་དར་རྒེད་འོག	Denchhi བདེན་ཕྱི་སྤྱི་འོག
Samdrup Jongkhar བསམ་གྲུབ་ལྗོངས་མཁར་རྫོང་ཁག	Gomdar སྒམ་དར་རྒེད་འོག	Broomi Chidoongkhar སྦྲུམ་མི་སྤྱི་གདུང་མཁར་སྤྱི་འོག
Samdrup Jongkhar བསམ་གྲུབ་ལྗོངས་མཁར་རྫོང་ཁག	Langchenphu གླང་ཅན་ཕུ་རྒེད་འོག	Rongchhuthang རོང་ཆུ་ཐང་སྤྱི་འོག
Samdrup Jongkhar བསམ་གྲུབ་ལྗོངས་མཁར་རྫོང་ཁག	Langchenphu གླང་ཅན་ཕུ་རྒེད་འོག	Agoorthang ཨ་གུར་ཐང་སྤྱི་འོག
Samdrup Jongkhar བསམ་གྲུབ་ལྗོངས་མཁར་རྫོང་ཁག	Langchenphu གླང་ཅན་ཕུ་རྒེད་འོག	Jampani འཇམ་དཔའ་ཎི་སྤྱི་འོག
Samdrup Jongkhar བསམ་གྲུབ་ལྗོངས་མཁར་རྫོང་ཁག	Langchenphu གླང་ཅན་ཕུ་རྒེད་འོག	Langchenphu གླང་ཅན་ཕུ་སྤྱི་འོག
Samdrup Jongkhar བསམ་གྲུབ་ལྗོངས་མཁར་རྫོང་ཁག	Langchenphu གླང་ཅན་ཕུ་རྒེད་འོག	Jangsa བྱང་ས་སྤྱི་འོག
Samdrup Jongkhar བསམ་གྲུབ་ལྗོངས་མཁར་རྫོང་ཁག	Lauri ལའུ་རི་རྒེད་འོག	Momring Rolnang མོམ་རིང་རོལ་ནང་སྤྱི་འོག
Samdrup Jongkhar བསམ་གྲུབ་ལྗོངས་མཁར་རྫོང་ཁག	Lauri ལའུ་རི་རྒེད་འོག	Lauri ལའུ་རི་སྤྱི་འོག
Samdrup Jongkhar བསམ་གྲུབ་ལྗོངས་མཁར་རྫོང་ཁག	Lauri ལའུ་རི་རྒེད་འོག	Betseling Doongmanma སྦས་རྩ་གླིང་གདུང་མན་མ་སྤྱི་འོག
Samdrup Jongkhar བསམ་གྲུབ་ལྗོངས་མཁར་རྫོང་ཁག	Lauri ལའུ་རི་རྒེད་འོག	Gonong Zangthig སྒོ་ནོང་ཟངས་ཐིག་སྤྱི་འོག
Samdrup Jongkhar བསམ་གྲུབ་ལྗོངས་མཁར་རྫོང་ཁག	Lauri ལའུ་རི་རྒེད་འོག	Tshothang མཚོ་ཐངས་སྤྱི་འོག
Samdrup Jongkhar བསམ་གྲུབ་ལྗོངས་མཁར་རྫོང་ཁག	Martshala མར་ཚྭ་ལ་རྒེད་འོག	Chhoedoong Kakani ཆོས་དུང་ཀ་ཀ་ནི་སྤྱི་འོག
Samdrup Jongkhar བསམ་གྲུབ་ལྗོངས་མཁར་རྫོང་ཁག	Martshala མར་ཚྭ་ལ་རྒེད་འོག	Sarjoong གསར་འབྱུང་སྤྱི་འོག
Samdrup Jongkhar བསམ་གྲུབ་ལྗོངས་མཁར་རྫོང་ཁག	Martshala མར་ཚྭ་ལ་རྒེད་འོག	Martshala མར་ཚྭ་ལ་སྤྱི་འོག
Samdrup Jongkhar བསམ་གྲུབ་ལྗོངས་མཁར་རྫོང་ཁག	Martshala མར་ཚྭ་ལ་རྒེད་འོག	Galingkhar Wangphoog དགའ་གླིང་མཁར་ཝང་ཕུག་སྤྱི་འོག
Samdrup Jongkhar བསམ་གྲུབ་ལྗོངས་མཁར་རྫོང་ཁག	Martshala མར་ཚྭ་ལ་རྒེད་འོག	Kaeptang Tsholingkhar ཀེབ་སྟང་མཚོ་གླིང་མཁར་སྤྱི་འོག
Samdrup Jongkhar བསམ་གྲུབ་ལྗོངས་མཁར་རྫོང་ཁག	Martshala མར་ཚྭ་ལ་རྒེད་འོག	Suzor Tshotsalu སུ་ཟོར་མཚོ་ཙ་ལུ་སྤྱི་འོག
Samdrup Jongkhar བསམ་གྲུབ་ལྗོངས་མཁར་རྫོང་ཁག	Orong ཨོ་རོང་རྒེད་འོག	Rimoong རི་མུང་སྤྱི་འོག
Samdrup Jongkhar བསམ་གྲུབ་ལྗོངས་མཁར་རྫོང་ཁག	Orong ཨོ་རོང་རྒེད་འོག	Jangchhubling བྱང་ཆུབ་གླིང་སྤྱི་འོག
Samdrup Jongkhar བསམ་གྲུབ་ལྗོངས་མཁར་རྫོང་ཁག	Orong ཨོ་རོང་རྒེད་འོག	Nabar Philooma ན་སྦར་ཕི་ལུ་མ་སྤྱི་འོག
Samdrup Jongkhar བསམ་གྲུབ་ལྗོངས་མཁར་རྫོང་ཁག	Orong ཨོ་རོང་རྒེད་འོག	Bilam Orong Suzoong སྦིས་ལམ་ཨོ་རོང་བསུ་གཟོངས་སྤྱི་འོག
Samdrup Jongkhar བསམ་གྲུབ་ལྗོངས་མཁར་རྫོང་ཁག	Orong ཨོ་རོང་རྒེད་འོག	Nagzor Wooling གནག་ཟོར་འུ་གླིང་སྤྱི་འོག
Samdrup Jongkhar བསམ་གྲུབ་ལྗོངས་མཁར་རྫོང་ཁག	Orong ཨོ་རོང་རྒེད་འོག	Morong མོ་རོང་སྤྱི་འོག
Samdrup Jongkhar བསམ་གྲུབ་ལྗོངས་མཁར་རྫོང་ཁག	Pemathang པདྨ་ཐང་རྒེད་འོག	Uesarna Warong གཡུ་གསར་ན་ཝ་རོང་སྤྱི་འོག
Samdrup Jongkhar བསམ་གྲུབ་ལྗོངས་མཁར་རྫོང་ཁག	Pemathang པདྨ་ཐང་རྒེད་འོག	Raling ར་གླིང་སྤྱི་འོག
Samdrup Jongkhar བསམ་གྲུབ་ལྗོངས་མཁར་རྫོང་ཁག	Pemathang པདྨ་ཐང་རྒེད་འོག	Pemathang པདྨ་ཐང་སྤྱི་འོག
Samdrup Jongkhar བསམ་གྲུབ་ལྗོངས་མཁར་རྫོང་ཁག	Pemathang པདྨ་ཐང་རྒེད་འོག	Chirtshosa Loongminang སྤྱིར་འཚོ་ས་ལུང་མི་ནང་སྤྱི་འོག
Samdrup Jongkhar བསམ་གྲུབ་ལྗོངས་མཁར་རྫོང་ཁག	Pemathang པདྨ་ཐང་རྒེད་འོག	Kathoobdrang Shilinggye དཀའ་ཐུབ་ཀྲང་ཤི་གླིང་རྒྱས་སྤྱི་འོག
Samdrup Jongkhar བསམ་གྲུབ་ལྗོངས་མཁར་རྫོང་ཁག	Phuntshothang ཕུན་ཚོགས་ཐང་རྒེད་འོག	Minjigang སྨིན་ཇི་སྒང་སྤྱི་འོག
Samdrup Jongkhar བསམ་གྲུབ་ལྗོངས་མཁར་རྫོང་ཁག	Phuntshothang ཕུན་ཚོགས་ཐང་རྒེད་འོག	Samdrupchhoeling བསམ་གྲུབ་ཆོས་གླིང་སྤྱི་འོག
Samdrup Jongkhar བསམ་གྲུབ་ལྗོངས་མཁར་རྫོང་ཁག	Phuntshothang ཕུན་ཚོགས་ཐང་རྒེད་འོག	Phuentshogthang ཕུན་ཚོགས་ཐང་སྤྱི་འོག
Samdrup Jongkhar བསམ་གྲུབ་ལྗོངས་མཁར་རྫོང་ཁག	Phuntshothang ཕུན་ཚོགས་ཐང་རྒེད་འོག	Baylamsharang སྦེ་ལམ་ཤ་རང་སྤྱི་འོག
Samdrup Jongkhar བསམ་གྲུབ་ལྗོངས་མཁར་རྫོང་ཁག	Phuntshothang ཕུན་ཚོགས་ཐང་རྒེད་འོག	Khamaedthang ཁ་སྨད་ཐང་སྤྱི་འོག
Samdrup Jongkhar བསམ་གྲུབ་ལྗོངས་མཁར་རྫོང་ཁག	Phuntshothang ཕུན་ཚོགས་ཐང་རྒེད་འོག	Doongkarling གདུང་དཀར་གླིང་སྤྱི་འོག
Samdrup Jongkhar བསམ་གྲུབ་ལྗོངས་མཁར་རྫོང་ཁག	Samrang བསམ་རང་རྒེད་འོག	Ngangtshothang Toed ངང་མཚོ་ཐང་སྟོད་སྤྱི་འོག
Samdrup Jongkhar བསམ་གྲུབ་ལྗོངས་མཁར་རྫོང་ཁག	Samrang བསམ་རང་རྒེད་འོག	Ngangtshothang Maed ངང་མཚོ་ཐང་སྨད་སྤྱི་འོག
Samdrup Jongkhar བསམ་གྲུབ་ལྗོངས་མཁར་རྫོང་ཁག	Samrang བསམ་རང་རྒེད་འོག	Damsagang Toed འདམ་ས་སྒང་སྟོད་སྤྱི་འོག
Samdrup Jongkhar བསམ་གྲུབ་ལྗོངས་མཁར་རྫོང་ཁག	Samrang བསམ་རང་རྒེད་འོག	Damsagang Maed འདམ་ས་སྒང་སྨད་སྤྱི་འོག
Samdrup Jongkhar བསམ་གྲུབ་ལྗོངས་མཁར་རྫོང་ཁག	Samrang བསམ་རང་རྒེད་འོག	Tshoduen མཚོ་བདུན་སྤྱི་འོག
Samdrup Jongkhar བསམ་གྲུབ་ལྗོངས་མཁར་རྫོང་ཁག	Serthi གསེར་ཐིག་རྒེད་འོག	Khandophoog Maenjiwoong མཁའ་འགྲོ་ཐུག་མན་ཇི་འུང་སྤྱི་འོག
Samdrup Jongkhar བསམ་གྲུབ་ལྗོངས་མཁར་རྫོང་ཁག	Serthi གསེར་ཐིག་རྒེད་འོག	Drenphoog དྲེན་ཕུག་སྤྱི་འོག
Samdrup Jongkhar བསམ་གྲུབ་ལྗོངས་མཁར་རྫོང་ཁག	Serthi གསེར་ཐིག་རྒེད་འོག	Phagchhog Suskar འཕགས་མཆོག་སུས་དཀར་སྤྱི་འོག
Samdrup Jongkhar བསམ་གྲུབ་ལྗོངས་མཁར་རྫོང་ཁག	Serthi གསེར་ཐིག་རྒེད་འོག	Dangtsho Serthig དངས་མཚོ་གསེར་ཐིག་སྤྱི་འོག
Samdrup Jongkhar བསམ་གྲུབ་ལྗོངས་མཁར་རྫོང་ཁག	Serthi གསེར་ཐིག་རྒེད་འོག	Monmola Tashithanggyed མོན་མོ་ལ་བཀྲིས་ཐང་བརྒྱད་སྤྱི་འོག
Samdrup Jongkhar བསམ་གྲུབ་ལྗོངས་མཁར་རྫོང་ཁག	Wangphu ཝང་ཕུག་རྒེད་འོག	Sacchilo ས་ཆི་ལོ་སྤྱི་འོག
Samdrup Jongkhar བསམ་གྲུབ་ལྗོངས་མཁར་རྫོང་ཁག	Wangphu ཝང་ཕུག་རྒེད་འོག	Bayuel Pangthang སྦ་གཡུལ་སྦང་ཐང་སྤྱི་འོག
Samdrup Jongkhar བསམ་གྲུབ་ལྗོངས་མཁར་རྫོང་ཁག	Wangphu ཝང་ཕུག་རྒེད་འོག	Shogshi ཤོག་ཤི་སྤྱི་འོག
Samdrup Jongkhar བསམ་གྲུབ་ལྗོངས་མཁར་རྫོང་ཁག	Wangphu ཝང་ཕུག་རྒེད་འོག	Serchhenmo Wangphoog གསེར་ཆེན་མོ་ཝང་ཕུག་སྤྱི་འོག
Samdrup Jongkhar བསམ་གྲུབ་ལྗོངས་མཁར་རྫོང་ཁག	Wangphu ཝང་ཕུག་རྒེད་འོག	Benporong Yarphoog བེན་པོ་རོང་ཡར་ཐུག་སྤྱི་འོག

=== Samtse District ===
Dzongkhag	Gewog	Chiwog
Samtse བསམ་རྩེ་རྫོང་ཁག	Dungtoe གདུང་སྟོད་རྒེད་འོག	Doongtoed Chhewa གདུང་སྟོད་ཆེ་བ་སྤྱི་འོག
Samtse བསམ་རྩེ་རྫོང་ཁག	Dungtoe གདུང་སྟོད་རྒེད་འོག	Doongtoed Chhungwa Jarikha གདུང་སྟོད་ཆུང་བ་འཇའ་རི་ཁ་སྤྱི་འོག
Samtse བསམ་རྩེ་རྫོང་ཁག	Dungtoe གདུང་སྟོད་རྒེད་འོག	Maedgang སྨད་སྒང་སྤྱི་འོག
Samtse བསམ་རྩེ་རྫོང་ཁག	Dungtoe གདུང་སྟོད་རྒེད་འོག	Doongtoed Khaling གདུང་སྟོད་ཁ་གླིང་སྤྱི་འོག
Samtse བསམ་རྩེ་རྫོང་ཁག	Dungtoe གདུང་སྟོད་རྒེད་འོག	Gebji Kuzhuggang གྱེབ་སྦྱི་སྐུ་བཞུགས་སྒང་སྤྱི་འོག
Samtse བསམ་རྩེ་རྫོང་ཁག	Dophoogchen རྡོ་ཕུག་ཅན་རྒེད་འོག	Aringgang Midzomsa ཨ་རིང་སྒང་མི་འཛོམས་ས་སྤྱི་འོག
Samtse བསམ་རྩེ་རྫོང་ཁག	Dophoogchen རྡོ་ཕུག་ཅན་རྒེད་འོག	Dangreyboog Ngagang དྭངས་རས་སྦུག་རྔ་སྒང་སྤྱི་འོག
Samtse བསམ་རྩེ་རྫོང་ཁག	Dophoogchen རྡོ་ཕུག་ཅན་རྒེད་འོག	Manigang Thingyersa མ་ཎི་སྒང་ཐིང་གཡེར་ས་སྤྱི་འོག
Samtse བསམ་རྩེ་རྫོང་ཁག	Dophoogchen རྡོ་ཕུག་ཅན་རྒེད་འོག	Melonggang Thuloonggang མེ་ལོང་སྒང་མཐུ་ལུང་སྒང་སྤྱི་འོག
Samtse བསམ་རྩེ་རྫོང་ཁག	Dophoogchen རྡོ་ཕུག་ཅན་རྒེད་འོག	Sangloong Senteng གསང་ལུང་སེང་སྟེང་སྤྱི་འོག
Samtse བསམ་རྩེ་རྫོང་ཁག	Dophoogchen རྡོ་ཕུག་ཅན་རྒེད་འོག	Singye སེ་དྒེ་སྤྱི་འོག
Samtse བསམ་རྩེ་རྫོང་ཁག	Duenchukha བདུམ་ཅུ་ཁ་རྒེད་འོག	Biloong Pongthra བི་ལུང་སྤུངས་ཁྲ་སྤྱི་འོག
Samtse བསམ་རྩེ་རྫོང་ཁག	Duenchukha བདུམ་ཅུ་ཁ་རྒེད་འོག	Gesarling Yomdeling གེ་སར་གླིང་གཡོ་མེད་གླིང་སྤྱི་འོག
Samtse བསམ་རྩེ་རྫོང་ཁག	Duenchukha བདུམ་ཅུ་ཁ་རྒེད་འོག	Dhuenchhukha Gabji བདུན་ཅུ་ཁ་དགའ་སྦྱིས་སྤྱི་འོག
Samtse བསམ་རྩེ་རྫོང་ཁག	Duenchukha བདུམ་ཅུ་ཁ་རྒེད་འོག	Domchhukha Shitakha དོམ་ཆུ་ཁ་ཤི་ཏ་ཁ་སྤྱི་འོག
Samtse བསམ་རྩེ་རྫོང་ཁག	Duenchukha བདུམ་ཅུ་ཁ་རྒེད་འོག	Gawaling Karzhing དགའ་བ་གླིང་དཀར་ཞིང་སྤྱི་འོག
Samtse བསམ་རྩེ་རྫོང་ཁག	Namgaychhoeling རྣམ་རྒྱས་ཆོས་གླིང་རྒེད་འོག	Gyalposhing Satsangsa རྒྱལ་པོ་ཤིང་ས་གཙང་ས་སྤྱི་འོག
Samtse བསམ་རྩེ་རྫོང་ཁག	Namgaychhoeling རྣམ་རྒྱས་ཆོས་གླིང་རྒེད་འོག	Sernyagang Tsholingkhar གསེར་ཉ་སྒང་མཚོ་གླིང་མཁར་སྤྱི་འོག
Samtse བསམ་རྩེ་རྫོང་ཁག	Namgaychhoeling རྣམ་རྒྱས་ཆོས་གླིང་རྒེད་འོག	Chhunaggang Chhoedleling ཆུ་ནག་སྒང་ཆོས་སྡེ་གླིང་སྤྱི་འོག
Samtse བསམ་རྩེ་རྫོང་ཁག	Namgaychhoeling རྣམ་རྒྱས་ཆོས་གླིང་རྒེད་འོག	Pagshingkha Tshachhugang སྤག་ཤིང་ཁ་ཚྭ་ཆུ་སྒང་སྤྱི་འོག
Samtse བསམ་རྩེ་རྫོང་ཁག	Namgaychhoeling རྣམ་རྒྱས་ཆོས་གླིང་རྒེད་འོག	Namgaychhoeling རྣམ་རྒྱས་ཆོས་གླིང་སྤྱི་འོག
Samtse བསམ་རྩེ་རྫོང་ཁག	Norbugang ནོར་བུ་སྒང་རྒེད་འོག	Lambi Lamjosa ལམ་སྦིས་ལམ་འགྱོ་ས་སྤྱི་འོག
Samtse བསམ་རྩེ་རྫོང་ཁག	Norbugang ནོར་བུ་སྒང་རྒེད་འོག	Dramzedgang Maedgang བྲམ་ཟེ་སྒང་སྨད་སྒང་སྤྱི་འོག
Samtse བསམ་རྩེ་རྫོང་ཁག	Norbugang ནོར་བུ་སྒང་རྒེད་འོག	Khangduzhi Kyidsa ཁང་གྲུ་བཞི་སྐྱིང་ས་སྤྱི་འོག
Samtse བསམ་རྩེ་རྫོང་ཁག	Norbugang ནོར་བུ་སྒང་རྒེད་འོག	Dawaling Yangphelthang ཟླ་བ་གླིང་གཡང་འཕེལ་ཐང་སྤྱི་འོག
Samtse བསམ་རྩེ་རྫོང་ཁག	Norbugang ནོར་བུ་སྒང་རྒེད་འོག	Damzhagsa Tsaphelthang བསྡང་བཞག་ས་ཙྭ་འཕེལ་ཐང་སྤྱི་འོག
Samtse བསམ་རྩེ་རྫོང་ཁག	Norgaygang ནོར་རྒྱས་སྒང་རྒེད་འོག	Chongzhu Tshachhu བཅོང་བཞག་ཚྭ་ཆུ་སྤྱི་འོག
Samtse བསམ་རྩེ་རྫོང་ཁག	Norgaygang ནོར་རྒྱས་སྒང་རྒེད་འོག	Chhugoo Phendegang ཆུ་འགུ་ཕན་སྡེ་སྒང་སྤྱི་འོག
Samtse བསམ་རྩེ་རྫོང་ཁག	Norgaygang ནོར་རྒྱས་སྒང་རྒེད་འོག	Khabaabgang Noryog ཁ་འབབ་སྒང་ནོར་གཡོག་སྤྱི་འོག
Samtse བསམ་རྩེ་རྫོང་ཁག	Norgaygang ནོར་རྒྱས་སྒང་རྒེད་འོག	Joenpang Lingarnang མགྱོན་སྤང་གླིང་གར་ནང་སྤྱི་འོག
Samtse བསམ་རྩེ་རྫོང་ཁག	Norgaygang ནོར་རྒྱས་སྒང་རྒེད་འོག	Dangreyboog Patshaling དྭངས་རས་སྦུག་སྤ་ཚ་གླིང་སྤྱི་འོག
Samtse བསམ་རྩེ་རྫོང་ཁག	Norgaygang ནོར་རྒྱས་སྒང་རྒེད་འོག	Miphelgang Samphelgang མི་འཕེལ་སྒང་མསམ་འཕེལ་སྒང་སྤྱི་འོག
Samtse བསམ་རྩེ་རྫོང་ཁག	Pemaling པདྨ་གླིང་རྒེད་འོག	Thangchhennang Damtshangna ཐང་ཆེན་ནང་དམ་ཚང་ན་སྤྱི་འོག
Samtse བསམ་རྩེ་རྫོང་ཁག	Pemaling པདྨ་གླིང་རྒེད་འོག	Chhusilgang Dramedsa ཆུ་བསིལ་སྒང་དགྲ་མེད་ས་སྤྱི་འོག
Samtse བསམ་རྩེ་རྫོང་ཁག	Pemaling པདྨ་གླིང་རྒེད་འོག	Norgeyling Singdregang ནོར་རྒྱལ་གླིང་ཤིང་འབྲས་སྒང་སྤྱི་འོག
Samtse བསམ་རྩེ་རྫོང་ཁག	Pemaling པདྨ་གླིང་རྒེད་འོག	Dizanggang Nakeyling དྲི་བཟང་སྒང་ནགས་སྐྱེས་གླིང་སྤྱི་འོག
Samtse བསམ་རྩེ་རྫོང་ཁག	Pemaling པདྨ་གླིང་རྒེད་འོག	Manigang Tashithang མ་ཎི་སྒང་བཀྲ་ཤིས་ཐང་སྤྱི་འོག
Samtse བསམ་རྩེ་རྫོང་ཁག	Phuentshogpelri ཕུན་ཚོགས་དབལ་རི་རྒེད་འོག	Gashingma Ketshaelgang Thongjabi དགའ་ཤིང་མ་སྐྱེད་ཚལ་སྐང་མཐོང་རྒྱ་སྦི་སྤྱི་འོག
Samtse བསམ་རྩེ་རྫོང་ཁག	Phuentshogpelri ཕུན་ཚོགས་དབལ་རི་རྒེད་འོག	Tashilakha Uelgyalling བཀྲ་ཤིས་ལ་ཁ་གཡུལ་རྐྱལ་གླིང་སྤྱི་འོག
Samtse བསམ་རྩེ་རྫོང་ཁག	Phuentshogpelri ཕུན་ཚོགས་དབལ་རི་རྒེད་འོག	Jangchhogling Lachhungthang བྱང་ཕྱོགས་གླིང་ལ་ཆུང་ཐང་སྤྱི་འོག
Samtse བསམ་རྩེ་རྫོང་ཁག	Phuentshogpelri ཕུན་ཚོགས་དབལ་རི་རྒེད་འོག	Chhunag Doomshinggang ཆུ་གནག་དུམ་ཤིང་སྒང་སྤྱི་འོག
Samtse བསམ་རྩེ་རྫོང་ཁག	Phuentshogpelri ཕུན་ཚོགས་དབལ་རི་རྒེད་འོག	Nyoenpaling Tingtingma སྨྱོན་པ་གླིང་ཏིང་ཏིང་མ་སྤྱི་འོག
Samtse བསམ་རྩེ་རྫོང་ཁག	Sangngagchhoeling གསང་སྔགས་ཆོས་གླིང་རྒེད་འོག	Ngoedroobling དངོས་གྲུབ་གླིང་སྤྱི་འོག
Samtse བསམ་རྩེ་རྫོང་ཁག	Sangngagchhoeling གསང་སྔགས་ཆོས་གླིང་རྒེད་འོག	Chhuchhungsa Karseling ཆུ་ཆུང་ས་དཀར་སེལ་གླིང་སྤྱི་འོག
Samtse བསམ་རྩེ་རྫོང་ཁག	Sangngagchhoeling གསང་སྔགས་ཆོས་གླིང་རྒེད་འོག	Joenlegsa Sangngangchhoeling བྱོན་ལེགས་ས་གསང་སྔགས་ཆོས་གླིང་སྤྱི་འོག
Samtse བསམ་རྩེ་རྫོང་ཁག	Sangngagchhoeling གསང་སྔགས་ཆོས་གླིང་རྒེད་འོག	Dephellingtoed Namseling བདེ་འཕེལ་གླིང་རྣམ་གསལ་གླིང་སྤྱི་འོག
Samtse བསམ་རྩེ་རྫོང་ཁག	Sangngagchhoeling གསང་སྔགས་ཆོས་གླིང་རྒེད་འོག	Dephellingmaed Khangzangling བདེ་འཕེལ་གླིང་སྨད་ཁང་བཟང་གླིང་སྤྱི་འོག
Samtse བསམ་རྩེ་རྫོང་ཁག	Samtse བསམ་རྩེ་རྒེད་འོག	Dewathang Lamaithang བདེ་བ་ཐང་བླ་མའི་ཐང་སྤྱི་འོག
Samtse བསམ་རྩེ་རྫོང་ཁག	Samtse བསམ་རྩེ་རྒེད་འོག	Nyimaling Chhirlogsa ཉི་མ་གླིང་ཕྱིར་ལོག་ས་སྤྱི་འོག
Samtse བསམ་རྩེ་རྫོང་ཁག	Samtse བསམ་རྩེ་རྒེད་འོག	Damtshangma Khandothang དམ་ཚང་མ་མཁའ་འགྲོ་ཐང་སྤྱི་འོག
Samtse བསམ་རྩེ་རྫོང་ཁག	Samtse བསམ་རྩེ་རྒེད་འོག	Satshamchhu Tshongdzonm ས་མཚམས་ཆུ་ཚོང་འཛོམས་སྤྱི་འོག
Samtse བསམ་རྩེ་རྫོང་ཁག	Samtse བསམ་རྩེ་རྒེད་འོག	Lingmaithang Taserpo གླིང་མའི་ཐང་རྟ་སེར་པོ་སྤྱི་འོག
Samtse བསམ་རྩེ་རྫོང་ཁག	Tading རྟ་སྡིང་རྒེད་འོག	Dangreyboong Nyindooglakha དྭངས་རས་སྦུག་ཉིན་གདུགས་ལ་ཁ་སྤྱི་འོག
Samtse བསམ་རྩེ་རྫོང་ཁག	Tading རྟ་སྡིང་རྒེད་འོག	Khempagang Panzhing ཁེམ་པ་སྒང་བཱན་ཞིང་སྤྱི་འོག
Samtse བསམ་རྩེ་རྫོང་ཁག	Tading རྟ་སྡིང་རྒེད་འོག	Thongsa Tobchhenthang མཐོང་ས་སྟོབས་ཆེནཐང་སྤྱི་འོག
Samtse བསམ་རྩེ་རྫོང་ཁག	Tading རྟ་སྡིང་རྒེད་འོག	Norjangsa Zochhaling ནོར་བྱང་ས་ཟོ་ཆ་གླིང་སྤྱི་འོག
Samtse བསམ་རྩེ་རྫོང་ཁག	Tading རྟ་སྡིང་རྒེད་འོག	Tading Tenpaling རྟ་སྡིང་བསྟེན་པ་གླིང་སྤྱི་འོག
Samtse བསམ་རྩེ་རྫོང་ཁག	Tashicholing བཀྲིས་ཙོས་གླིང་རྒེད་འོག	Daaling Gangjoog དངས་གླིང་གངས་འཇུག་སྤྱི་འོག
Samtse བསམ་རྩེ་རྫོང་ཁག	Tashicholing བཀྲིས་ཙོས་གླིང་རྒེད་འོག	Dewachen Zhiwaling བདེ་བ་ཅན་ཞི་བ་གླིང་སྤྱི་འོག
Samtse བསམ་རྩེ་རྫོང་ཁག	Tashicholing བཀྲིས་ཙོས་གླིང་རྒེད་འོག	Baepoteng Kangdoongphug སྦས་པོ་སྟེང་རྐང་དུང་ཕུག་སྤྱི་འོག
Samtse བསམ་རྩེ་རྫོང་ཁག	Tashicholing བཀྲིས་ཙོས་གླིང་རྒེད་འོག	Norjangsa Peljorling ནོར་བྱང་ས་དཔལ་འབྱོར་གླིང་སྤྱི་འོག
Samtse བསམ་རྩེ་རྫོང་ཁག	Tashicholing བཀྲིས་ཙོས་གླིང་རྒེད་འོག	Tashichhoeling བཀྲིས་ཆོས་གླིང་སྤྱི་འོག
Samtse བསམ་རྩེ་རྫོང་ཁག	Tendruk བསྟང་འབྲུག་རྒེད་འོག	Miglamthang Thagpzosa མིག་ལམ་ཐང་ཐགཔ་བཟོ་ས་སྤྱི་འོག
Samtse བསམ་རྩེ་རྫོང་ཁག	Tendruk བསྟང་འབྲུག་རྒེད་འོག	Khengtong Targothang ཁེང་སྟོང་སྟར་གོ་ཐང་སྤྱི་འོག
Samtse བསམ་རྩེ་རྫོང་ཁག	Tendruk བསྟང་འབྲུག་རྒེད་འོག	Nyizergang Tendruk ཉི་ཟེར་སྒང་བསྟན་འབརུག་སྤྱི་འོག
Samtse བསམ་རྩེ་རྫོང་ཁག	Tendruk བསྟང་འབྲུག་རྒེད་འོག	Kachhen Kuchhen ཀ་ཆེན་སྐུ་ཆེན་སྤྱི་འོག
Samtse བསམ་རྩེ་རྫོང་ཁག	Tendruk བསྟང་འབྲུག་རྒེད་འོག	Dawathang Kuengaling ཟླ་བ་ཐང་ཀུན་དགའ་གླིང་སྤྱི་འོག
Samtse བསམ་རྩེ་རྫོང་ཁག	Ugentse ཨྱོན་རྩེ་རྒེད་འོག	Nyimalung Tharpaling ཉི་མ་ལུང་ཐར་པ་གླིང་སྤྱི་འོག
Samtse བསམ་རྩེ་རྫོང་ཁག	Ugentse ཨྱོན་རྩེ་རྒེད་འོག	Dangkarling Dechhengang དངས་དཀར་གླིང་བདེ་ཆེན་སྒང་སྤྱི་འོག
Samtse བསམ་རྩེ་རྫོང་ཁག	Ugentse ཨྱོན་རྩེ་རྒེད་འོག	Kardog དཀར་མདོག་སྤྱི་འོག
Samtse བསམ་རྩེ་རྫོང་ཁག	Ugentse ཨྱོན་རྩེ་རྒེད་འོག	Dangreyboog Rigpailing དྭངས་རས་སྦུག་རིག་པའི་གླིང་སྤྱི་འོག
Samtse བསམ་རྩེ་རྫོང་ཁག	Ugentse ཨྱོན་རྩེ་རྒེད་འོག	Jarithang རྒྱ་རི་ཐང་སྤྱི་འོག
Samtse བསམ་རྩེ་རྫོང་ཁག	Yoeseltse འོད་གསལ་རྩེ་རྒེད་འོག	Zurigang Jigmedthang ཟུར་རི་སྒང་འཇིགས་མེད་ཐང་སྤྱི་འོག
Samtse བསམ་རྩེ་རྫོང་ཁག	Yoeseltse འོད་གསལ་རྩེ་རྒེད་འོག	Pelkithang Rangjoongling དཔལ་སྐྱིད་ཐང་རང་འབྱུང་གླིང་སྤྱི་འོག
Samtse བསམ་རྩེ་རྫོང་ཁག	Yoeseltse འོད་གསལ་རྩེ་རྒེད་འོག	Dungkar དུང་དཀར་སྤྱི་འོག
Samtse བསམ་རྩེ་རྫོང་ཁག	Yoeseltse འོད་གསལ་རྩེ་རྒེད་འོག	Koenchhogling Soenakha དཀོན་མཆོག་གླིང་བསོད་ན་མཁར་སྤྱི་འོག
Samtse བསམ་རྩེ་རྫོང་ཁག	Yoeseltse འོད་གསལ་རྩེ་རྒེད་འོག	Rinchhenphoog Samtenchhu རིན་ཆེན་ཕུག་བསམ་གཏན་ཆུ་སྤྱི་འོག

=== Sarpang District ===
Dzongkhag	Gewog	Chiwog
Sarpang གསར་སྤང་རྫོང་ཁག	Chhuzagang ཆུ་འཛག་སྒང་རྒེད་འོག	Chagsakhar ལྕགས་ས་མཁར་སྤྱི་འོག
Sarpang གསར་སྤང་རྫོང་ཁག	Chhuzagang ཆུ་འཛག་སྒང་རྒེད་འོག	Pangzor སྤང་ཟོར་སྤྱི་འོག
Sarpang གསར་སྤང་རྫོང་ཁག	Chhuzagang ཆུ་འཛག་སྒང་རྒེད་འོག	Thongjabi Yueling མཐོང་རྒྱ་སྦིས་ཡུལ་གླིང་སྤྱི་འོག
Sarpang གསར་སྤང་རྫོང་ཁག	Chhuzagang ཆུ་འཛག་སྒང་རྒེད་འོག	Nyimaling Shawapong ཉི་མ་གླིང་ཤ་ཝ་སྤོང་སྤྱི་འོག
Sarpang གསར་སྤང་རྫོང་ཁག	Chhuzagang ཆུ་འཛག་སྒང་རྒེད་འོག	Barthang བར་ཐང་སྤྱི་འོག
Sarpang གསར་སྤང་རྫོང་ཁག	Chhudzom ཆུ་འཛོམས་རྒེད་འོག	Sherabling ཤེས་རབ་གླིང་སྤྱི་འོག
Sarpang གསར་སྤང་རྫོང་ཁག	Chhudzom ཆུ་འཛོམས་རྒེད་འོག	Gaalegthang དགའ་ལེགས་ཐང་སྤྱི་འོག
Sarpang གསར་སྤང་རྫོང་ཁག	Chhudzom ཆུ་འཛོམས་རྒེད་འོག	Jangchhubling བྱང་ཆུབ་གླིང་སྤྱི་འོག
Sarpang གསར་སྤང་རྫོང་ཁག	Chhudzom ཆུ་འཛོམས་རྒེད་འོག	Dragchhu བྲག་ཆུ་སྤྱི་འོག
Sarpang གསར་སྤང་རྫོང་ཁག	Chhudzom ཆུ་འཛོམས་རྒེད་འོག	Lhayuel ལྷ་གཡུལ་སྤྱི་འོག
Sarpang གསར་སྤང་རྫོང་ཁག	Dekiling བདེ་སྐྱིད་གླིང་རྒེད་འོག	Jigmedling འཇིགས་མེད་གླིང་སྤྱི་འོག
Sarpang གསར་སྤང་རྫོང་ཁག	Dekiling བདེ་སྐྱིད་གླིང་རྒེད་འོག	Nubgang ནུབ་སྒང་སྤྱི་འོག
Sarpang གསར་སྤང་རྫོང་ཁག	Dekiling བདེ་སྐྱིད་གླིང་རྒེད་འོག	Dekidling བདེ་སྐྱིད་གླིང་སྤྱི་འོག
Sarpang གསར་སྤང་རྫོང་ཁག	Dekiling བདེ་སྐྱིད་གླིང་རྒེད་འོག	Gawaithang དགའ་བའི་ཐང་སྤྱི་འོག
Sarpang གསར་སྤང་རྫོང་ཁག	Dekiling བདེ་སྐྱིད་གླིང་རྒེད་འོག	Chhoekhorling ཆོས་འཁོར་གླིང་སྤྱི་འོག
Sarpang གསར་སྤང་རྫོང་ཁག	Gakiling དགའ་སྐྱིད་གླིང་རྒེད་འོག	Maenchhulam སྨན་ཆུ་ལམ་སྤྱི་འོག
Sarpang གསར་སྤང་རྫོང་ཁག	Gakiling དགའ་སྐྱིད་གླིང་རྒེད་འོག	Sangkha སང་ཁ་སྤྱི་འོག
Sarpang གསར་སྤང་རྫོང་ཁག	Gakiling དགའ་སྐྱིད་གླིང་རྒེད་འོག	Rilangthang རི་གླང་ཐང་སྤྱི་འོག
Sarpang གསར་སྤང་རྫོང་ཁག	Gakiling དགའ་སྐྱིད་གླིང་རྒེད་འོག	Getemkha དགེ་སྟེམ་ཁ་སྤྱི་འོག
Sarpang གསར་སྤང་རྫོང་ཁག	Gakiling དགའ་སྐྱིད་གླིང་རྒེད་འོག	Gakidling དགའ་སྐྱིད་གླིང་སྤྱི་འོག
Sarpang གསར་སྤང་རྫོང་ཁག	Gelephu དགེ་ལེགས་ཕུ་རྒེད་འོག	Pelrithangkha Toed དཔལ་རི་ཐང་ཁ་སྟོད་སྤྱི་འོག
Sarpang གསར་སྤང་རྫོང་ཁག	Gelephu དགེ་ལེགས་ཕུ་རྒེད་འོག	Pelrithangkha Maed དཔལ་རི་ཐང་ཁ་སྨད་སྤྱི་འོག
Sarpang གསར་སྤང་རྫོང་ཁག	Gelephu དགེ་ལེགས་ཕུ་རྒེད་འོག	Dzamlingthang འཛམ་གླིང་ཐང་སྤྱི་འོག
Sarpang གསར་སྤང་རྫོང་ཁག	Gelephu དགེ་ལེགས་ཕུ་རྒེད་འོག	Pemathang པདྨ་ཐང་སྤྱི་འོག
Sarpang གསར་སྤང་རྫོང་ཁག	Gelephu དགེ་ལེགས་ཕུ་རྒེད་འོག	Lekidthang ལས་སྐྱིད་ཐང་སྤྱི་འོག
Sarpang གསར་སྤང་རྫོང་ཁག	Jigmechholing འཇིགས་མེད་ཆོས་གླིང་རྒེད་འོག	Gongtsekha གོང་རྩེ་ཁ་སྤྱི་འོག
Sarpang གསར་སྤང་རྫོང་ཁག	Jigmechholing འཇིགས་མེད་ཆོས་གླིང་རྒེད་འོག	Gongduegang དགོངས་འདུས་སྒང་སྤྱི་འོག
Sarpang གསར་སྤང་རྫོང་ཁག	Jigmechholing འཇིགས་མེད་ཆོས་གླིང་རྒེད་འོག	Chhoetenkhar ཆོས་རྟེན་མཁར་སྤྱི་འོག
Sarpang གསར་སྤང་རྫོང་ཁག	Jigmechholing འཇིགས་མེད་ཆོས་གླིང་རྒེད་འོག	Khamaed ཁ་སྨད་སྤྱི་འོག
Sarpang གསར་སྤང་རྫོང་ཁག	Jigmechholing འཇིགས་མེད་ཆོས་གླིང་རྒེད་འོག	Khatoed ཁ་སྟོད་སྤྱི་འོག
Sarpang གསར་སྤང་རྫོང་ཁག	Jigmechholing འཇིགས་མེད་ཆོས་གླིང་རྒེད་འོག	Samkhar བསམ་ཁར་སྤྱི་འོག
Sarpang གསར་སྤང་རྫོང་ཁག	Samtenling བསམ་གཏན་གླིང་རྒེད་འོག	Samteling བསམ་གྷཏན་གླིང་སྤྱི་འོག
Sarpang གསར་སྤང་རྫོང་ཁག	Samtenling བསམ་གཏན་གླིང་རྒེད་འོག	Khenpagang མཁན་པ་སྒང་སྤྱི་འོག
Sarpang གསར་སྤང་རྫོང་ཁག	Samtenling བསམ་གཏན་གླིང་རྒེད་འོག	Samthenthang བསམ་གཏན་ཐང་སྤྱི་འོག
Sarpang གསར་སྤང་རྫོང་ཁག	Samtenling བསམ་གཏན་གླིང་རྒེད་འོག	Dechhenpelri བདེ་ཆེན་དཔལ་རི་སྤྱི་འོག
Sarpang གསར་སྤང་རྫོང་ཁག	Samtenling བསམ་གཏན་གླིང་རྒེད་འོག	Chhoekhorling Dechhenpelri ཆོས་འཁོར་གླིང་བདེ་ཆེན་དཔལ་རི་སྤྱི་འོག
Sarpang གསར་སྤང་རྫོང་ཁག	Senggey སེ་ངྒེ་རྒེད་འོག	Rishong རི་ཤོང་སྤྱི་འོག
Sarpang གསར་སྤང་རྫོང་ཁག	Senggey སེ་ངྒེ་རྒེད་འོག	Nyenyul སྙན་ཡུལ་སྤྱི་འོག
Sarpang གསར་སྤང་རྫོང་ཁག	Senggey སེ་ངྒེ་རྒེད་འོག	Labtsakha ལབ་རྩ་ཁ་སྤྱི་འོག
Sarpang གསར་སྤང་རྫོང་ཁག	Senggey སེ་ངྒེ་རྒེད་འོག	Yarpheling ཡར་འཕེལ་གླིང་སྤྱི་འོག
Sarpang གསར་སྤང་རྫོང་ཁག	Senggey སེ་ངྒེ་རྒེད་འོག	Sangyethang སངས་རྒྱས་ཐང་སྤྱི་འོག
Sarpang གསར་སྤང་རྫོང་ཁག	Sherzhong གསེར་གཞོང་རྒེད་འོག	Sherzhong གསེར་གཞོང་སྤྱི་འོག
Sarpang གསར་སྤང་རྫོང་ཁག	Sherzhong གསེར་གཞོང་རྒེད་འོག	Barshong བར་གཤོང་སྤྱི་འོག
Sarpang གསར་སྤང་རྫོང་ཁག	Sherzhong གསེར་གཞོང་རྒེད་འོག	Pemayoedling པདྨ་འོད་གླིང་སྤྱི་འོག
Sarpang གསར་སྤང་རྫོང་ཁག	Sherzhong གསེར་གཞོང་རྒེད་འོག	Norbuling ནོར་བུ་གླིང་སྤྱི་འོག
Sarpang གསར་སྤང་རྫོང་ཁག	Sherzhong གསེར་གཞོང་རྒེད་འོག	Tashiphoog བཀྲིས་ཕུག་སྤྱི་འོག
Sarpang གསར་སྤང་རྫོང་ཁག	Shompangkha ཤོམ་སྤང་ཁ་རྒེད་འོག	Shompangkha ཤོམ་སྤང་ཁ་སྤྱི་འོག
Sarpang གསར་སྤང་རྫོང་ཁག	Shompangkha ཤོམ་སྤང་ཁ་རྒེད་འོག	Dargyethang དར་རྒྱས་ཐང་སྤྱི་འོག
Sarpang གསར་སྤང་རྫོང་ཁག	Shompangkha ཤོམ་སྤང་ཁ་རྒེད་འོག	Koenchhogling དཀོན་མཆོག་གླིང་སྤྱི་འོག
Sarpang གསར་སྤང་རྫོང་ཁག	Shompangkha ཤོམ་སྤང་ཁ་རྒེད་འོག	Gomchola སྒོམ་ལྕོ་ལ་སྤྱི་འོག
Sarpang གསར་སྤང་རྫོང་ཁག	Shompangkha ཤོམ་སྤང་ཁ་རྒེད་འོག	Risoomgang རི་གསུམ་སྒང་སྤྱི་འོག
Sarpang གསར་སྤང་རྫོང་ཁག	Tareythang རྟ་རས་ཐང་རྒེད་འོག	Tashichhoeling བཀྲིས་ཆོས་གླིང་སྤྱི་འོག
Sarpang གསར་སྤང་རྫོང་ཁག	Tareythang རྟ་རས་ཐང་རྒེད་འོག	Yoedzergang འོད་ཟེར་སྒང་སྤྱི་འོག
Sarpang གསར་སྤང་རྫོང་ཁག	Tareythang རྟ་རས་ཐང་རྒེད་འོག	Pemahhoeling པདྨ་ཆོས་གླིང་སྤྱི་འོག
Sarpang གསར་སྤང་རྫོང་ཁག	Tareythang རྟ་རས་ཐང་རྒེད་འོག	Dorjitse རྡོ་རྗེ་རྩེ་སྤྱི་འོག
Sarpang གསར་སྤང་རྫོང་ཁག	Tareythang རྟ་རས་ཐང་རྒེད་འོག	Woongchhiloo འུང་ཆི་ལུ་སྤྱི་འོག
Sarpang གསར་སྤང་རྫོང་ཁག	Umling ཨུམ་གླིང་རྒེད་འོག	Tashithang བཀྲིས་ཐང་སྤྱི་འོག
Sarpang གསར་སྤང་རྫོང་ཁག	Umling ཨུམ་གླིང་རྒེད་འོག	Daangling དང་གླིང་སྤྱི་འོག
Sarpang གསར་སྤང་རྫོང་ཁག	Umling ཨུམ་གླིང་རྒེད་འོག	Doongmin དུང་མིན་སྤྱི་འོག
Sarpang གསར་སྤང་རྫོང་ཁག	Umling ཨུམ་གླིང་རྒེད་འོག	Rijoog རི་འཇུག་སྤྱི་འོག
Sarpang གསར་སྤང་རྫོང་ཁག	Umling ཨུམ་གླིང་རྒེད་འོག	Gaden དགའ་ལྡན་སྤྱི་འོག

=== Thimphu District ===
Dzongkhag	Gewog	Chiwog
Thimphu ཐིམ་ཕུ་རྫོང་ཁག	Chang ལྕང་རྒེད་འོག	Lhoongtsho Tashigang ལྷུང་འཚོ་བཀྲིས་སྒང་སྤྱི་འོག
Thimphu ཐིམ་ཕུ་རྫོང་ཁག	Chang ལྕང་རྒེད་འོག	Yoedselpang འོད་གསལ་སྤང་སྤྱི་འོག
Thimphu ཐིམ་ཕུ་རྫོང་ཁག	Chang ལྕང་རྒེད་འོག	Changyokha Debsid ལྕང་ཡོ་ཁ་སྡེབ་སྲིད་སྤྱི་འོག
Thimphu ཐིམ་ཕུ་རྫོང་ཁག	Chang ལྕང་རྒེད་འོག	Ramtogtog Tsangrina རམ་རྟོག་རྟོག་གཙང་རི་ན་སྤྱི་འོག
Thimphu ཐིམ་ཕུ་རྫོང་ཁག	Chang ལྕང་རྒེད་འོག	Gangchhe Talakha སྒང་ཆེ་རྟ་ལ་ཁ་སྤྱི་འོག
Thimphu ཐིམ་ཕུ་རྫོང་ཁག	Darkala དར་དཀར་ལ་རྒེད་འོག	Chamgang Maed ལྕམ་སྒང་སྨད་སྤྱི་འོག
Thimphu ཐིམ་ཕུ་རྫོང་ཁག	Darkala དར་དཀར་ལ་རྒེད་འོག	Chamgang Toed ལྕམ་སྒང་སྟོད་སྤྱི་འོག
Thimphu ཐིམ་ཕུ་རྫོང་ཁག	Darkala དར་དཀར་ལ་རྒེད་འོག	Doongdrog འདུང་འབྲོག་སྤྱི་འོག
Thimphu ཐིམ་ཕུ་རྫོང་ཁག	Darkala དར་དཀར་ལ་རྒེད་འོག	Wangdrog ཝང་འབྲོག་སྤྱི་འོག
Thimphu ཐིམ་ཕུ་རྫོང་ཁག	Darkala དར་དཀར་ལ་རྒེད་འོག	Gyaltala རྒྱལ་བལྟ་ལ་སྤྱི་འོག
Thimphu ཐིམ་ཕུ་རྫོང་ཁག	Genye དགེ་བསྙེན་རྒེད་འོག	Wangbama ཝང་བ་མ་སྤྱི་འོག
Thimphu ཐིམ་ཕུ་རྫོང་ཁག	Genye དགེ་བསྙེན་རྒེད་འོག	Chizhi སྤྱི་གཞི་སྤྱི་འོག
Thimphu ཐིམ་ཕུ་རྫོང་ཁག	Genye དགེ་བསྙེན་རྒེད་འོག	Zhanglegkha ཟངས་ལེགས་ཁ་སྤྱི་འོག
Thimphu ཐིམ་ཕུ་རྫོང་ཁག	Genye དགེ་བསྙེན་རྒེད་འོག	Genyenkha དགེ་བསྙེན་ཁ་སྤྱི་འོག
Thimphu ཐིམ་ཕུ་རྫོང་ཁག	Genye དགེ་བསྙེན་རྒེད་འོག	Tshochhenkha Zamtog མཚོ་ཆེན་ཁ་ཟམ་ཏོག་སྤྱི་འོག
Thimphu ཐིམ་ཕུ་རྫོང་ཁག	Kawang ཀ་ཝང་རྒེད་འོག	Boegarna Dodennang བོད་སྒར་ན་_རྡོ་གདན་ནང་སྤྱི་འོག
Thimphu ཐིམ་ཕུ་རྫོང་ཁག	Kawang ཀ་ཝང་རྒེད་འོག	Kuzhugchen སྐུ་བཞུགས་ཅན་སྤྱི་འོག
Thimphu ཐིམ་ཕུ་རྫོང་ཁག	Kawang ཀ་ཝང་རྒེད་འོག	Chhandagang Chhoekortse Phajoding ཕྱག་མདའ་སྒང་_ཆོས་འཁོར་ཙེ_ཕ་ཇོ་སྡིང་སྤྱི་འོག
Thimphu ཐིམ་ཕུ་རྫོང་ཁག	Kawang ཀ་ཝང་རྒེད་འོག	Chhagminang Chhoekhor ཕྱག་མི་ནང་_ཆོས་འཁོར་སྤྱི་འོག
Thimphu ཐིམ་ཕུ་རྫོང་ཁག	Kawang ཀ་ཝང་རྒེད་འོག	Dashi Zhoshuel མདའ་གཞི་ཞོ་ཤུལ་སྤྱི་འོག
Thimphu ཐིམ་ཕུ་རྫོང་ཁག	Lingzhi གླིང་གཞི་རྒེད་འོག	Chhuzarkha ཆུ་ཟར་ཁ་སྤྱི་འོག
Thimphu ཐིམ་ཕུ་རྫོང་ཁག	Lingzhi གླིང་གཞི་རྒེད་འོག	Khangkidyuel ཁང་སྐྱིད་ཡུལ་སྤྱི་འོག
Thimphu ཐིམ་ཕུ་རྫོང་ཁག	Lingzhi གླིང་གཞི་རྒེད་འོག	Gangyuel སྒང་ཡུལ་སྤྱི་འོག
Thimphu ཐིམ་ཕུ་རྫོང་ཁག	Lingzhi གླིང་གཞི་རྒེད་འོག	Shayuel ཤ་ཡུལ་སྤྱི་འོག
Thimphu ཐིམ་ཕུ་རྫོང་ཁག	Lingzhi གླིང་གཞི་རྒེད་འོག	Chagphu ལྕགས་ཕུ་སྤྱི་འོག
Thimphu ཐིམ་ཕུ་རྫོང་ཁག	Mewang སྨད་ཝང་རྒེད་འོག	Tshaloongna ཚ་ལུང་ན་སྤྱི་འོག
Thimphu ཐིམ་ཕུ་རྫོང་ཁག	Mewang སྨད་ཝང་རྒེད་འོག	Jiminang སྦྱིས་མི་ནང་སྤྱི་འོག
Thimphu ཐིམ་ཕུ་རྫོང་ཁག	Mewang སྨད་ཝང་རྒེད་འོག	Danglo Namsaeling དངས་ལོ་རྣམ་སྲས་གླིང་སྤྱི་འོག
Thimphu ཐིམ་ཕུ་རྫོང་ཁག	Mewang སྨད་ཝང་རྒེད་འོག	Khasdrapchu ཁ་ས་ཁྲབ་ཅུ་སྤྱི་འོག
Thimphu ཐིམ་ཕུ་རྫོང་ཁག	Mewang སྨད་ཝང་རྒེད་འོག	Sisinang སི་སི་ནང་སྤྱི་འོག
Thimphu ཐིམ་ཕུ་རྫོང་ཁག	Naro ན་རོ་རྒེད་འོག	Moentsiphoog སྨོན་རྕི་ཕུག་སྤྱི་འོག
Thimphu ཐིམ་ཕུ་རྫོང་ཁག	Naro ན་རོ་རྒེད་འོག	Barshong Nango བར་ཤོང་ནང་སྒོ་སྤྱི་འོག
Thimphu ཐིམ་ཕུ་རྫོང་ཁག	Naro ན་རོ་རྒེད་འོག	Zhomthang ཞོམ་ཐང་སྤྱི་འོག
Thimphu ཐིམ་ཕུ་རྫོང་ཁག	Naro ན་རོ་རྒེད་འོག	Pagoed པ་རྒོད་སྤྱི་འོག
Thimphu ཐིམ་ཕུ་རྫོང་ཁག	Naro ན་རོ་རྒེད་འོག	Tagsidthang སྟག་སྲིད་ཐང་སྤྱི་འོག
Thimphu ཐིམ་ཕུ་རྫོང་ཁག	Soe སྲོས་རྒེད་འོག	Jangothang བྱང་སྒོ་ཐང་སྤྱི་འོག
Thimphu ཐིམ་ཕུ་རྫོང་ཁག	Soe སྲོས་རྒེད་འོག	Damgochong གདམ་སྒོ་སྐྱོང་སྤྱི་འོག
Thimphu ཐིམ་ཕུ་རྫོང་ཁག	Soe སྲོས་རྒེད་འོག	Dotaapaithang རྡོ་སྟབས་པའི་ཐང་སྤྱི་འོག
Thimphu ཐིམ་ཕུ་རྫོང་ཁག	Soe སྲོས་རྒེད་འོག	Tozotoen རྟོ་བཟོ་སྟོན་སྤྱི་འོག
Thimphu ཐིམ་ཕུ་རྫོང་ཁག	Soe སྲོས་རྒེད་འོག	Jomphu འཇོམ་ཕུ་སྤྱི་འོག

=== Trashigang District ===
Dzongkhag	Gewog	Chiwog
Trashigang བཀྲ་ཤིས་སྒང་རྫོང་ཁག	Bartsham བར་མཚམས་རྒེད་འོག	Trashang བཀྲ་ཤང་སྤྱི་འོག
Trashigang བཀྲ་ཤིས་སྒང་རྫོང་ཁག	Bartsham བར་མཚམས་རྒེད་འོག	Bainangkhar Nangkhar བའི་ནང་མཁར་སྣངས་མཁར་སྤྱི་འོག
Trashigang བཀྲ་ཤིས་སྒང་རྫོང་ཁག	Bartsham བར་མཚམས་རྒེད་འོག	Jamoong Kumoong ཇ་མུང་སྐུ་མུང་སྤྱི་འོག
Trashigang བཀྲ་ཤིས་སྒང་རྫོང་ཁག	Bartsham བར་མཚམས་རྒེད་འོག	Dzongthong Menchhari རྫོང་མཐོང་མེན་ཆ་རི་སྤྱི་འོག
Trashigang བཀྲ་ཤིས་སྒང་རྫོང་ཁག	Bartsham བར་མཚམས་རྒེད་འོག	Moogtangkhar མུག་སྟངས་མཁར་སྤྱི་འོག
Trashigang བཀྲ་ཤིས་སྒང་རྫོང་ཁག	Bidung སྦིས་གདུང་རྒེད་འོག	Khairi Saling ཁའི་རི་ས་གླིང་སྤྱི་འོག
Trashigang བཀྲ་ཤིས་སྒང་རྫོང་ཁག	Bidung སྦིས་གདུང་རྒེད་འོག	Lemphang ལེམ་ཕང་སྤྱི་འོག
Trashigang བཀྲ་ཤིས་སྒང་རྫོང་ཁག	Bidung སྦིས་གདུང་རྒེད་འོག	Tsigtoom ཙིག་སྟུང་སྤྱི་འོག
Trashigang བཀྲ་ཤིས་སྒང་རྫོང་ཁག	Bidung སྦིས་གདུང་རྒེད་འོག	Tsekhar ཚེ་མཁར་སྤྱི་འོག
Trashigang བཀྲ་ཤིས་སྒང་རྫོང་ཁག	Bidung སྦིས་གདུང་རྒེད་འོག	Kakaniwog ཀ་ཀ་ནི་འོག་སྤྱི་འོག
Trashigang བཀྲ་ཤིས་སྒང་རྫོང་ཁག	Kanglung བཀང་ལུང་རྒེད་འོག	Pangthang Ritsangdoong སྤང་ཐང་རི་གཙང་གདུང་སྤྱི་འོག
Trashigang བཀྲ་ཤིས་སྒང་རྫོང་ཁག	Kanglung བཀང་ལུང་རྒེད་འོག	Maanthong སྨན་འཐོང་སྤྱི་འོག
Trashigang བཀྲ་ཤིས་སྒང་རྫོང་ཁག	Kanglung བཀང་ལུང་རྒེད་འོག	Mertsham Thragom མེར་མཚམས་ཁྲ་སྒོམ་སྤྱི་འོག
Trashigang བཀྲ་ཤིས་སྒང་རྫོང་ཁག	Kanglung བཀང་ལུང་རྒེད་འོག	Yonphoogla ཡོན་ཕུག་ལ་སྤྱི་འོག
Trashigang བཀྲ་ཤིས་སྒང་རྫོང་ཁག	Kanglung བཀང་ལུང་རྒེད་འོག	Rongthoong Shingchen རོང་ཐུང་ཤིང་ཅན་སྤྱི་འོག
Trashigang བཀྲ་ཤིས་སྒང་རྫོང་ཁག	Kangpar རྐང་པར་རྒེད་འོག	Kangpar Lamyong རྐང་པར་ལམ་ཡོངས་སྤྱི་འོག
Trashigang བཀྲ་ཤིས་སྒང་རྫོང་ཁག	Kangpar རྐང་པར་རྒེད་འོག	Passaphoog Peydoong སྤས་ས་ཕུག་དཔེ་རྡུང་སྤྱི་འོག
Trashigang བཀྲ་ཤིས་སྒང་རྫོང་ཁག	Kangpar རྐང་པར་རྒེད་འོག	Zordoong ཟོར་གདུང་སྤྱི་འོག
Trashigang བཀྲ་ཤིས་སྒང་རྫོང་ཁག	Kangpar རྐང་པར་རྒེད་འོག	Threlphoog ཐྲལ་ཕུག་སྤྱི་འོག
Trashigang བཀྲ་ཤིས་སྒང་རྫོང་ཁག	Kangpar རྐང་པར་རྒེད་འོག	Bedengphoog Merdag སྦེ་སྡེང་ཐུག་མེར་བདག་སྤྱི་འོག
Trashigang བཀྲ་ཤིས་སྒང་རྫོང་ཁག	Khaling ཁ་གླིང་རྒེད་འོག	Khaling ཁ་གླིང་སྤྱི་འོག
Trashigang བཀྲ་ཤིས་སྒང་རྫོང་ཁག	Khaling ཁ་གླིང་རྒེད་འོག	Brekha Meringzor བྲེ་ཁ་མེ་རིང་ཟོར་སྤྱི་འོག
Trashigang བཀྲ་ཤིས་སྒང་རྫོང་ཁག	Khaling ཁ་གླིང་རྒེད་འོག	Bayphoog Togkaphu སྦས་ཕུག་རྟོགས་ཀ་ཕུ་སྤྱི་འོག
Trashigang བཀྲ་ཤིས་སྒང་རྫོང་ཁག	Khaling ཁ་གླིང་རྒེད་འོག	Gomchhu Kholdoong སྒོམ་ཆུ་འཁོལ་གདུང་སྤྱི་འོག
Trashigang བཀྲ་ཤིས་སྒང་རྫོང་ཁག	Khaling ཁ་གླིང་རྒེད་འོག	Barshong བར་ཤོང་སྤྱི་འོག
Trashigang བཀྲ་ཤིས་སྒང་རྫོང་ཁག	Khaling ཁ་གླིང་རྒེད་འོག	Jiri Lemi ཇི་རི་ལེ་མི་སྤྱི་འོག
Trashigang བཀྲ་ཤིས་སྒང་རྫོང་ཁག	Lumang ཀླུ་མང་རྒེད་འོག	Drubkhang Lumang གྲུབ་ཁང་ཀླུ་རྨང་སྤྱི་འོག
Trashigang བཀྲ་ཤིས་སྒང་རྫོང་ཁག	Lumang ཀླུ་མང་རྒེད་འོག	Chhengri Doongmanma ཆེངས་རི་གདུང་མན་མ་སྤྱི་འོག
Trashigang བཀྲ་ཤིས་སྒང་རྫོང་ཁག	Lumang ཀླུ་མང་རྒེད་འོག	Kharphoog Kurchhilo མཁར་ཕུག་སྐུར་ཆི་ལོ་སྤྱི་འོག
Trashigang བཀྲ་ཤིས་སྒང་རྫོང་ཁག	Lumang ཀླུ་མང་རྒེད་འོག	Riserboo Tsangpo རི་སེར་བུ་གཙང་པོ་སྤྱི་འོག
Trashigang བཀྲ་ཤིས་སྒང་རྫོང་ཁག	Lumang ཀླུ་མང་རྒེད་འོག	Moochhu Wakhar མུ་ཆུ་ཝ་མཁར་སྤྱི་འོག
Trashigang བཀྲ་ཤིས་སྒང་རྫོང་ཁག	Lumang ཀླུ་མང་རྒེད་འོག	Tshogoenpa མཚོ་དགོན་པ་སྤྱི་འོག
Trashigang བཀྲ་ཤིས་སྒང་རྫོང་ཁག	Merag མེ་རག་རྒེད་འོག	Merag Toed མེ་རག་སྟོད་སྤྱི་འོག
Trashigang བཀྲ་ཤིས་སྒང་རྫོང་ཁག	Merag མེ་རག་རྒེད་འོག	Merag Maed མེ་རག་སྨད་སྤྱི་འོག
Trashigang བཀྲ་ཤིས་སྒང་རྫོང་ཁག	Merag མེ་རག་རྒེད་འོག	Gyengo གྱེན་འགོ་སྤྱི་འོག
Trashigang བཀྲ་ཤིས་སྒང་རྫོང་ཁག	Merag མེ་རག་རྒེད་འོག	Khashateng ཁ་ཤཱ་སྟེངས་སྤྱི་འོག
Trashigang བཀྲ་ཤིས་སྒང་རྫོང་ཁག	Merag མེ་རག་རྒེད་འོག	Khiliphoo ཁི་ལི་ཕུ་སྤྱི་འོག
Trashigang བཀྲ་ཤིས་སྒང་རྫོང་ཁག	Phongmed ཕོངས་མེད་རྒེད་འོག	Phongmed ཕོངས་མེད་སྤྱི་འོག
Trashigang བཀྲ་ཤིས་སྒང་རྫོང་ཁག	Phongmed ཕོངས་མེད་རྒེད་འོག	Thongrong མཐོང་རོང་སྤྱི་འོག
Trashigang བཀྲ་ཤིས་སྒང་རྫོང་ཁག	Phongmed ཕོངས་མེད་རྒེད་འོག	Lem གླེམ་སྤྱི་འོག
Trashigang བཀྲ་ཤིས་སྒང་རྫོང་ཁག	Phongmed ཕོངས་མེད་རྒེད་འོག	Yabrang ཡ་བྲང་སྤྱི་འོག
Trashigang བཀྲ་ཤིས་སྒང་རྫོང་ཁག	Phongmed ཕོངས་མེད་རྒེད་འོག	Phimshong ཕིམ་ཤོང་སྤྱི་འོག
Trashigang བཀྲ་ཤིས་སྒང་རྫོང་ཁག	Radi ར་དི་རྒེད་འོག	Pakaling པ་ཀ་གླིང་སྤྱི་འོག
Trashigang བཀྲ་ཤིས་སྒང་རྫོང་ཁག	Radi ར་དི་རྒེད་འོག	Dekidling Tsenkhar བདེ་སྐྱིད་གླིང་བཙན་མཁར་སྤྱི་འོག
Trashigang བཀྲ་ཤིས་སྒང་རྫོང་ཁག	Radi ར་དི་རྒེད་འོག	Tonglingpam སྟོངས་གླིང་སྤམ་སྤྱི་འོག
Trashigang བཀྲ་ཤིས་སྒང་རྫོང་ཁག	Radi ར་དི་རྒེད་འོག	Kadam བཀའ་དམ་སྤྱི་འོག
Trashigang བཀྲ་ཤིས་སྒང་རྫོང་ཁག	Radi ར་དི་རྒེད་འོག	Nagtshang Togshingmang སྣག་ཚང་རྟོག་ཤིང་མང་སྤྱི་འོག
Trashigang བཀྲ་ཤིས་སྒང་རྫོང་ཁག	Sagteng སག་སྟེང་རྒེད་འོག	Sagteng སག་སྟེང་སྤྱི་འོག
Trashigang བཀྲ་ཤིས་སྒང་རྫོང་ཁག	Sagteng སག་སྟེང་རྒེད་འོག	Joenkhar Moorbi བྱོང་ཁར་མུར་སྦི་སྤྱི་འོག
Trashigang བཀྲ་ཤིས་སྒང་རྫོང་ཁག	Sagteng སག་སྟེང་རྒེད་འོག	Thagthri ཁྲག་ཁྲི་སྤྱི་འོག
Trashigang བཀྲ་ཤིས་སྒང་རྫོང་ཁག	Sagteng སག་སྟེང་རྒེད་འོག	Borangmang Borangtse སྦོ་རང་རྨང་སྦོ་རང་རྩེ་སྤྱི་འོག
Trashigang བཀྲ་ཤིས་སྒང་རྫོང་ཁག	Sagteng སག་སྟེང་རྒེད་འོག	Pusa Tenmang སྤུ་ས་རྟེན་མང་སྤྱི་འོག
Trashigang བཀྲ་ཤིས་སྒང་རྫོང་ཁག	Samkhar བསམ་མཁར་རྒེད་འོག	Maelphel Samkhar མེལ་འཕེལ་བསམ་མཁར་སྤྱི་འོག
Trashigang བཀྲ་ཤིས་སྒང་རྫོང་ཁག	Samkhar བསམ་མཁར་རྒེད་འོག	Khabti Lungtenzampa ཁབས་སྟི་ལུང་བསྟང་ཟམ་པ་སྤྱི་འོག
Trashigang བཀྲ་ཤིས་སྒང་རྫོང་ཁག	Samkhar བསམ་མཁར་རྒེད་འོག	Bikhar Domkhar བི་མཁར་དོན་མཁར་སྤྱི་འོག
Trashigang བཀྲ་ཤིས་སྒང་རྫོང་ཁག	Samkhar བསམ་མཁར་རྒེད་འོག	Kapang Yenangdrangsa ཀ་སྤང་ཡེ་ནང་བྲང་ས་སྤྱི་འོག
Trashigang བཀྲ་ཤིས་སྒང་རྫོང་ཁག	Samkhar བསམ་མཁར་རྒེད་འོག	Rangzhikhar Serdrang རང་གཞི་མཁར་སེར་བྲང་སྤྱི་འོག
Trashigang བཀྲ་ཤིས་སྒང་རྫོང་ཁག	Samkhar བསམ་མཁར་རྒེད་འོག	Chagzam Pam ལྕགས་ཟམ་སྤམ་སྤྱི་འོག
Trashigang བཀྲ་ཤིས་སྒང་རྫོང་ཁག	Shongphoog ཤོང་ཕུག་རྒེད་འོག	Dramin Shongphoog བྲ་མིན་ཤོང་ཕུག་སྤྱི་འོག
Trashigang བཀྲ་ཤིས་སྒང་རྫོང་ཁག	Shongphoog ཤོང་ཕུག་རྒེད་འོག	Chhangmi Rangjoong འཆང་མི་རང་འབྱུང་སྤྱི་འོག
Trashigang བཀྲ་ཤིས་སྒང་རྫོང་ཁག	Shongphoog ཤོང་ཕུག་རྒེད་འོག	Galing དགའ་གླིང་སྤྱི་འོག
Trashigang བཀྲ་ཤིས་སྒང་རྫོང་ཁག	Shongphoog ཤོང་ཕུག་རྒེད་འོག	Gongtsephangma Yobinang གོང་རྩེ་ཕང་མ་ཡོ་སྦི་ནང་སྤྱི་འོག
Trashigang བཀྲ་ཤིས་སྒང་རྫོང་ཁག	Shongphoog ཤོང་ཕུག་རྒེད་འོག	Chaling སྐྱ་གླིང་སྤྱི་འོག
Trashigang བཀྲ་ཤིས་སྒང་རྫོང་ཁག	Thrimshing ཁྲིམས་ཤིང་རྒེད་འོག	Thrimshing ཁྲིམས་ཤིང་སྤྱི་འོག
Trashigang བཀྲ་ཤིས་སྒང་རྫོང་ཁག	Thrimshing ཁྲིམས་ཤིང་རྒེད་འོག	Doongsingma Tsangpo གདུང་སིང་མ་གཙང་པོ་སྤྱི་འོག
Trashigang བཀྲ་ཤིས་སྒང་རྫོང་ཁག	Thrimshing ཁྲིམས་ཤིང་རྒེད་འོག	Bongzor Phegpari སྦོང་ཟོར་ཕེགས་པ་རི་སྤྱི་འོག
Trashigang བཀྲ་ཤིས་སྒང་རྫོང་ཁག	Thrimshing ཁྲིམས་ཤིང་རྒེད་འོག	Ramchongma Yemkhar རམ་སྐྱོང་མ་ཡེམ་མཁར་སྤྱི་འོག
Trashigang བཀྲ་ཤིས་སྒང་རྫོང་ཁག	Thrimshing ཁྲིམས་ཤིང་རྒེད་འོག	Berdoongma Thoongkhar སྦེར་གདུང་མ་འཐུང་མཁར་སྤྱི་འོག
Trashigang བཀྲ་ཤིས་སྒང་རྫོང་ཁག	Uzorong ཨུ་མཛོ་རོང་རྒེད་འོག	Benshingmo Jomtsang སྦེན་ཤིང་མོ་འཇོམས་གཙང་སྤྱི་འོག
Trashigang བཀྲ་ཤིས་སྒང་རྫོང་ཁག	Uzorong ཨུ་མཛོ་རོང་རྒེད་འོག	Chhiya ཕྱི་ཡ་སྤྱི་འོག
Trashigang བཀྲ་ཤིས་སྒང་རྫོང་ཁག	Uzorong ཨུ་མཛོ་རོང་རྒེད་འོག	Rizor Yerchhilo རི་ཟོར་གཡེལ་ཆི་ལོ་སྤྱི་འོག
Trashigang བཀྲ་ཤིས་སྒང་རྫོང་ཁག	Uzorong ཨུ་མཛོ་རོང་རྒེད་འོག	Barkazor Maenkhar བར་ཀ་ཟོར་སྨན་མཁར་སྤྱི་འོག
Trashigang བཀྲ་ཤིས་སྒང་རྫོང་ཁག	Uzorong ཨུ་མཛོ་རོང་རྒེད་འོག	Baepam སྦས་སྦམ་སྤྱི་འོག
Trashigang བཀྲ་ཤིས་སྒང་རྫོང་ཁག	Yangnyer ཡངས་ཉེར་རྒེད་འོག	Daliphang Ragshigo ད་ལི་ཐང་ཏག་ཤི་གོ་སྤྱི་འོག
Trashigang བཀྲ་ཤིས་སྒང་རྫོང་ཁག	Yangnyer ཡངས་ཉེར་རྒེད་འོག	Duroong Ngambinlang དུ་རུང་ངམ་སྦི་ནང་སྤྱི་འོག
Trashigang བཀྲ་ཤིས་སྒང་རྫོང་ཁག	Yangnyer ཡངས་ཉེར་རྒེད་འོག	Khardza Leyphoog མཁར་ཛ་ལེ་ཕུག་སྤྱི་འོག
Trashigang བཀྲ་ཤིས་སྒང་རྫོང་ཁག	Yangnyer ཡངས་ཉེར་རྒེད་འོག	Shokang Tagtagpa ཤོ་བཀང་ཏག་ཏག་པ་སྤྱི་འོག
Trashigang བཀྲ་ཤིས་སྒང་རྫོང་ཁག	Yangnyer ཡངས་ཉེར་རྒེད་འོག	Dargyeling Kharthoong དར་རྒྱས་གླིང་མཁར་ཐུང་སྤྱི་འོག

=== Trashiyangtse District ===
Dzongkhag	Gewog	Chiwog
Trashiyangtse བཀྲ་ཤིས་གཡང་རྩེ་རྫོང་ཁག	Bumdeling བུམ་སྡེ་གླིང་རྒེད་འོག	Pangkhar Taphel སྤང་མཁར་རྟ་འཕེལ་སྤྱི་འོག
Trashiyangtse བཀྲ་ཤིས་གཡང་རྩེ་རྫོང་ཁག	Bumdeling བུམ་སྡེ་གླིང་རྒེད་འོག	Bomdir Wogmanang སྦོམ་འདིར་འོག་མ་ནང་སྤྱི་འོག
Trashiyangtse བཀྲ་ཤིས་གཡང་རྩེ་རྫོང་ཁག	Bumdeling བུམ་སྡེ་གླིང་རྒེད་འོག	Betsamang སྦེ་རྩ་མང་སྤྱི་འོག
Trashiyangtse བཀྲ་ཤིས་གཡང་རྩེ་རྫོང་ཁག	Bumdeling བུམ་སྡེ་གླིང་རྒེད་འོག	Ngalimang Phanteng ང་ལི་མང་ཕན་སྟེང་སྤྱི་འོག
Trashiyangtse བཀྲ་ཤིས་གཡང་རྩེ་རྫོང་ཁག	Bumdeling བུམ་སྡེ་གླིང་རྒེད་འོག	Gangkhardoong Tshaling སྒང་མཁར་དུང་པ་ཚྭ་གླིང་སྤྱི་འོག
Trashiyangtse བཀྲ་ཤིས་གཡང་རྩེ་རྫོང་ཁག	Jamkhar འཇམ་མཁར་རྒེད་འོག	Laishoom Largyab ལའི་ཤུམ་ལར་རྒྱབ་སྤྱི་འོག
Trashiyangtse བཀྲ་ཤིས་གཡང་རྩེ་རྫོང་ཁག	Jamkhar འཇམ་མཁར་རྒེད་འོག	Chhema Tagchhema ཕྱེ་མ་_སྟག་ཕྱེ་མ་སྤྱི་འོག
Trashiyangtse བཀྲ་ཤིས་གཡང་རྩེ་རྫོང་ཁག	Jamkhar འཇམ་མཁར་རྒེད་འོག	Neydrag Pachhu གནས་བྲག་སྤ་ཆུ་སྤྱི་འོག
Trashiyangtse བཀྲ་ཤིས་གཡང་རྩེ་རྫོང་ཁག	Jamkhar འཇམ་མཁར་རྒེད་འོག	Shingkhar Tongla ཤིང་མཁར་སྟོང་ལ་སྤྱི་འོག
Trashiyangtse བཀྲ་ཤིས་གཡང་རྩེ་རྫོང་ཁག	Jamkhar འཇམ་མཁར་རྒེད་འོག	Rijoong Yoob རི་འབྱུང་ཡུབ་སྤྱི་འོག
Trashiyangtse བཀྲ་ཤིས་གཡང་རྩེ་རྫོང་ཁག	Khamdang ཁམས་དྭངས་རྒེད་འོག	Dungtse Lengkhar དུང་རྩེ་གླེང་མཁར་སྤྱི་འོག
Trashiyangtse བཀྲ་ཤིས་གཡང་རྩེ་རྫོང་ཁག	Khamdang ཁམས་དྭངས་རྒེད་འོག	Domtshang Karmazom དོམ་ཚང་_ཀརྨ་འཛོམས་སྤྱི་འོག
Trashiyangtse བཀྲ་ཤིས་གཡང་རྩེ་རྫོང་ཁག	Khamdang ཁམས་དྭངས་རྒེད་འོག	Serpang Shalli གསེར་སྤང་ཤ་ལི་སྤྱི་འོག
Trashiyangtse བཀྲ་ཤིས་གཡང་རྩེ་རྫོང་ཁག	Khamdang ཁམས་དྭངས་རྒེད་འོག	Nombaring Shazam རྣོམ་བ་རིང་ཤ་ཟམ་སྤྱི་འོག
Trashiyangtse བཀྲ་ཤིས་གཡང་རྩེ་རྫོང་ཁག	Khamdang ཁམས་དྭངས་རྒེད་འོག	Khamdang Manla ཁམས་དྭངས་མན་ལ་སྤྱི་འོག
Trashiyangtse བཀྲ་ཤིས་གཡང་རྩེ་རྫོང་ཁག	Ramjar རམ་སྦྱར་རྒེད་འོག	Domtshang Doongmaen དོམ་ཚང་གདུང་སྨན་སྤྱི་འོག
Trashiyangtse བཀྲ་ཤིས་གཡང་རྩེ་རྫོང་ཁག	Ramjar རམ་སྦྱར་རྒེད་འོག	Bawoong བ་འུང་སྤྱི་འོག
Trashiyangtse བཀྲ་ཤིས་གཡང་རྩེ་རྫོང་ཁག	Ramjar རམ་སྦྱར་རྒེད་འོག	Khalapangthang Tsangrong ཁ་ལ་སྤང་ཐང་གཙང་རོང་སྤྱི་འོག
Trashiyangtse བཀྲ་ཤིས་གཡང་རྩེ་རྫོང་ཁག	Ramjar རམ་སྦྱར་རྒེད་འོག	Lengbartang Woongkhar ལེང་བར་སྟངས་འུང་མགྷར་སྤྱི་འོག
Trashiyangtse བཀྲ་ཤིས་གཡང་རྩེ་རྫོང་ཁག	Ramjar རམ་སྦྱར་རྒེད་འོག	Bainangreb Romang སྦའི་ནང་རེབ་རོ་མང་སྤྱི་འོག
Trashiyangtse བཀྲ་ཤིས་གཡང་རྩེ་རྫོང་ཁག	Toetsho སྟོད་མཚོ་རྒེད་འོག	Nangkhar Seb ནང་མཁར་གསེབ་སྤྱི་འོག
Trashiyangtse བཀྲ་ཤིས་གཡང་རྩེ་རྫོང་ཁག	Toetsho སྟོད་མཚོ་རྒེད་འོག	Jangphoogtse Thangdoong བྱང་ཕུག་རྩེ་ཐང་དུང་སྤྱི་འོག
Trashiyangtse བཀྲ་ཤིས་གཡང་རྩེ་རྫོང་ཁག	Toetsho སྟོད་མཚོ་རྒེད་འོག	Maeldoong མལ་གདུང་སྤྱི་འོག
Trashiyangtse བཀྲ་ཤིས་གཡང་རྩེ་རྫོང་ཁག	Toetsho སྟོད་མཚོ་རྒེད་འོག	Sertsho གསེར་མཚོ་སྤྱི་འོག
Trashiyangtse བཀྲ་ཤིས་གཡང་རྩེ་རྫོང་ཁག	Toetsho སྟོད་མཚོ་རྒེད་འོག	Khinyel Togshing ཁྱི་ཉལ་ལྟོག་ཤིང་སྤྱི་འོག
Trashiyangtse བཀྲ་ཤིས་གཡང་རྩེ་རྫོང་ཁག	Toetsho སྟོད་མཚོ་རྒེད་འོག	Chhemkhar Manam ཆེམ་མཁར་མ་ནམ་སྤྱི་འོག
Trashiyangtse བཀྲ་ཤིས་གཡང་རྩེ་རྫོང་ཁག	Tongmizhangsa སྟོང་མི་གཞང་ས་རྒེད་འོག	Maenchu Tsangdoong སྨན་ཆུ་གཙང་གདུང་སྤྱི་འོག
Trashiyangtse བཀྲ་ཤིས་གཡང་རྩེ་རྫོང་ཁག	Tongmizhangsa སྟོང་མི་གཞང་ས་རྒེད་འོག	Pang Lhauzhing སྤང་པ་ལྷའུ་ཞིང་སྤྱི་འོག
Trashiyangtse བཀྲ་ཤིས་གཡང་རྩེ་རྫོང་ཁག	Tongmizhangsa སྟོང་མི་གཞང་ས་རྒེད་འོག	Changmadoong Shoganang ལྕང་མ་གདུང་ཤོ་ག་ནང་སྤྱི་འོག
Trashiyangtse བཀྲ་ཤིས་གཡང་རྩེ་རྫོང་ཁག	Tongmizhangsa སྟོང་མི་གཞང་ས་རྒེད་འོག	Bagpa Kuenzangling བག་པ་ཀུན་བཟང་གླིང་སྤྱི་འོག
Trashiyangtse བཀྲ་ཤིས་གཡང་རྩེ་རྫོང་ཁག	Tongmizhangsa སྟོང་མི་གཞང་ས་རྒེད་འོག	Bainangkhar Gomkor སྦའི་ནང་མཁར་སྒོམ་བསྐོར་སྤྱི་འོག
Trashiyangtse བཀྲ་ཤིས་གཡང་རྩེ་རྫོང་ཁག	Yalang ཡ་ལང་རྒེད་འོག	Doogti Gashing སྡུག་སྟི་དགའ་ཤིང་སྤྱི་འོག
Trashiyangtse བཀྲ་ཤིས་གཡང་རྩེ་རྫོང་ཁག	Yalang ཡ་ལང་རྒེད་འོག	Chhema Melongkhar ཆེ་མ་མེ་ལོང་མཁར་སྤྱི་འོག
Trashiyangtse བཀྲ་ཤིས་གཡང་རྩེ་རྫོང་ཁག	Yalang ཡ་ལང་རྒེད་འོག	Namthi Yarphel གནམ་འཐི་ཡར་འཕེལ་སྤྱི་འོག
Trashiyangtse བཀྲ་ཤིས་གཡང་རྩེ་རྫོང་ཁག	Yalang ཡ་ལང་རྒེད་འོག	Rolam Thragom རོ་ལམ་ཁྲ་སྒོམ་སྤྱི་འོག
Trashiyangtse བཀྲ་ཤིས་གཡང་རྩེ་རྫོང་ཁག	Yalang ཡ་ལང་རྒེད་འོག	Phugyang Yalang ཕུ་ཡངས་པ་ཡ་ལང་སྤྱི་འོག
Trashiyangtse བཀྲ་ཤིས་གཡང་རྩེ་རྫོང་ཁག	Yangtse གཡང་རྩེ་རྒེད་འོག	Bayling སྦས་གླིང་སྤྱི་འོག
Trashiyangtse བཀྲ་ཤིས་གཡང་རྩེ་རྫོང་ཁག	Yangtse གཡང་རྩེ་རྒེད་འོག	Lichen གླི་ཅན་སྤྱི་འོག
Trashiyangtse བཀྲ་ཤིས་གཡང་རྩེ་རྫོང་ཁག	Yangtse གཡང་རྩེ་རྒེད་འོག	Baney Bimkhar སྦ་གནས་སྦིམ་མཁར་སྤྱི་འོག
Trashiyangtse བཀྲ་ཤིས་གཡང་རྩེ་རྫོང་ཁག	Yangtse གཡང་རྩེ་རྒེད་འོག	Gangkhar སྒང་མཁར་སྤྱི་འོག
Trashiyangtse བཀྲ་ཤིས་གཡང་རྩེ་རྫོང་ཁག	Yangtse གཡང་རྩེ་རྒེད་འོག	Rabti རབ་སྟི་སྤྱི་འོག

=== Trongsa District ===
Dzongkhag	Gewog	Chiwog
Trongsa ཀུན་དགའ་རབ་བརྟེན་སྤྱི་འོག	Dragteng ཀྲོང་གསར་རྫོང་ཁག	Tagtse Tashidingkha སྟག་རྩེ་བཀྲིས་སྡིང་ཁ་སྤྱི་འོག
Trongsa ཀུན་དགའ་རབ་བརྟེན་སྤྱི་འོག	Dragteng ཀྲོང་གསར་རྫོང་ཁག	Uesar གཡུས་གསར་སྤྱི་འོག
Trongsa ཀུན་དགའ་རབ་བརྟེན་སྤྱི་འོག	Dragteng ཀྲོང་གསར་རྫོང་ཁག	Kuenga Rabten ཀུན་དགའ་རབ་བརྟེན་སྤྱི་འོག
Trongsa ཀུན་དགའ་རབ་བརྟེན་སྤྱི་འོག	Dragteng ཀྲོང་གསར་རྫོང་ཁག	Samlingkha Toed བསམ་གླིང་ཁསྟོད་སྤྱི་འོག
Trongsa ཀུན་དགའ་རབ་བརྟེན་སྤྱི་འོག	Dragteng ཀྲོང་གསར་རྫོང་ཁག	Samlingkha Maed བསམ་གླིང་ཁ་སྨད་སྤྱི་འོག
Trongsa ཀུན་དགའ་རབ་བརྟེན་སྤྱི་འོག	Korphoog སྐོར་ཕུག་རྒེད་འོག	Nabi མནའ་སྦིས་སྤྱི་འོག
Trongsa ཀུན་དགའ་རབ་བརྟེན་སྤྱི་འོག	Korphoog སྐོར་ཕུག་རྒེད་འོག	Korphoog Toed སྐོར་ཕུག་སྟོད་སྤྱི་འོག
Trongsa ཀུན་དགའ་རབ་བརྟེན་སྤྱི་འོག	Korphoog སྐོར་ཕུག་རྒེད་འོག	Korphoog Maed སྐོར་ཕུག་སྨད་སྤྱི་འོག
Trongsa ཀུན་དགའ་རབ་བརྟེན་སྤྱི་འོག	Korphoog སྐོར་ཕུག་རྒེད་འོག	Nyimzhong Toed ཉིམ་ཞོང་སྟོད་སྤྱི་འོག
Trongsa ཀུན་དགའ་རབ་བརྟེན་སྤྱི་འོག	Korphoog སྐོར་ཕུག་རྒེད་འོག	Nyimzhong Maed ཉིམ་ཞོང་སྨད་སྤྱི་འོག
Trongsa ཀུན་དགའ་རབ་བརྟེན་སྤྱི་འོག	Langthil གླང་མཐིལ་རྒེད་འོག	Langthil གླང་མཐིལ་སྤྱི་འོག
Trongsa ཀུན་དགའ་རབ་བརྟེན་སྤྱི་འོག	Langthil གླང་མཐིལ་རྒེད་འོག	Dangdoong དངས་དུང་སྤྱི་འོག
Trongsa ཀུན་དགའ་རབ་བརྟེན་སྤྱི་འོག	Langthil གླང་མཐིལ་རྒེད་འོག	Baling བ་གླིང་སྤྱི་འོག
Trongsa ཀུན་དགའ་རབ་བརྟེན་སྤྱི་འོག	Langthil གླང་མཐིལ་རྒེད་འོག	Jangbi བྱང་སྦིས་སྤྱི་འོག
Trongsa ཀུན་དགའ་རབ་བརྟེན་སྤྱི་འོག	Langthil གླང་མཐིལ་རྒེད་འོག	Yuendroongchhoeling གཡུ་དྲུང་ཆོས་གླིང་སྤྱི་འོག
Trongsa ཀུན་དགའ་རབ་བརྟེན་སྤྱི་འོག	Nubi ནུ་སྦིས་རྒེད་འོག	Gagar Karzhong དགའ་སྒར་དཀར་ཞོང་སྤྱི་འོག
Trongsa ཀུན་དགའ་རབ་བརྟེན་སྤྱི་འོག	Nubi ནུ་སྦིས་རྒེད་འོག	Darbab Sinphoog དར་བབ་སྲིན་ཕུག་སྤྱི་འོག
Trongsa ཀུན་དགའ་རབ་བརྟེན་སྤྱི་འོག	Nubi ནུ་སྦིས་རྒེད་འོག	Bemji Chela བོན་སྦྱིས་སྤྱེལ་སྤྱི་འོག
Trongsa ཀུན་དགའ་རབ་བརྟེན་སྤྱི་འོག	Nubi ནུ་སྦིས་རྒེད་འོག	Bji Saengbji སྦྱིས་གསེངམ་སྦྱིས་སྤྱི་འོག
Trongsa ཀུན་དགའ་རབ་བརྟེན་སྤྱི་འོག	Nubi ནུ་སྦིས་རྒེད་འོག	Bagochen Boolingpang Ueling བགོ་ཅན་བུ་ལིང་སྤང་ཨུ་གླིང་སྤྱི་འོག
Trongsa ཀུན་དགའ་རབ་བརྟེན་སྤྱི་འོག	Tangsibji སྟང་སི་སྦྱིས་རྒེད་འོག	Chendenbji སྤྱན་ལྡན་སྦྱིས་སྤྱི་འོག
Trongsa ཀུན་དགའ་རབ་བརྟེན་སྤྱི་འོག	Tangsibji སྟང་སི་སྦྱིས་རྒེད་འོག	Nyala Drangla ཉ་ལ་བྲང་ལ་སྤྱི་འོག
Trongsa ཀུན་དགའ་རབ་བརྟེན་སྤྱི་འོག	Tangsibji སྟང་སི་སྦྱིས་རྒེད་འོག	Tangsbji སྟང་ས་སྦྱིས་སྤྱི་འོག
Trongsa ཀུན་དགའ་རབ་བརྟེན་སྤྱི་འོག	Tangsibji སྟང་སི་སྦྱིས་རྒེད་འོག	Tshangkha ཚང་ཁ་སྤྱི་འོག
Trongsa ཀུན་དགའ་རབ་བརྟེན་སྤྱི་འོག	Tangsibji སྟང་སི་སྦྱིས་རྒེད་འོག	Kela ཀེ་ལ་སྤྱི་འོག

=== Tsirang District ===
Dzongkhag	Gewog	Chiwog
Tsirang རྩི་རང་རྫོང་ཁག	Barshong བར་གཤོང་རྒེད་འོག	Barshong Maed བར་གཤོང་སྨད་སྤྱི་འོག
Tsirang རྩི་རང་རྫོང་ཁག	Barshong བར་གཤོང་རྒེད་འོག	Barshong Toed བར་གཤོང་སྟོད་སྤྱི་འོག
Tsirang རྩི་རང་རྫོང་ཁག	Barshong བར་གཤོང་རྒེད་འོག	Chunyikhang བཅུ་གཉིས་ཁང་སྤྱི་འོག
Tsirang རྩི་རང་རྫོང་ཁག	Barshong བར་གཤོང་རྒེད་འོག	Gangtogkha སྒང་ཏོག་ཁ་སྤྱི་འོག
Tsirang རྩི་རང་རྫོང་ཁག	Barshong བར་གཤོང་རྒེད་འོག	Toedsang སྟོད་སངས་སྤྱི་འོག
Tsirang རྩི་རང་རྫོང་ཁག	Dunglagang དུང་ལ་སྒང་རྒེད་འོག	Norjangsa ནོར་བྱང་ས་སྤྱི་འོག
Tsirang རྩི་རང་རྫོང་ཁག	Dunglagang དུང་ལ་སྒང་རྒེད་འོག	Dingrigang Lhamoiloongm ལྡིང་རི་སྒང་ལྷ་མོའི་ལུངམ་སྤྱི་འོག
Tsirang རྩི་རང་རྫོང་ཁག	Dunglagang དུང་ལ་སྒང་རྒེད་འོག	Khirithang ཁྱི་རི་ཐང་སྤྱི་འོག
Tsirang རྩི་རང་རྫོང་ཁག	Dunglagang དུང་ལ་སྒང་རྒེད་འོག	Dangreyboog Maed དྭངས་རས་སྦུག་སྨད་སྤྱི་འོག
Tsirang རྩི་རང་རྫོང་ཁག	Dunglagang དུང་ལ་སྒང་རྒེད་འོག	Dangreyboog Toed དྭངས་རས་སྦུག་སྟོད་སྤྱི་འོག
Tsirang རྩི་རང་རྫོང་ཁག	Gosarling སྒོ་གསར་གླིང་རྒེད་འོག	Phuensoomgang ཕུན་སུམ་སྒང་སྤྱི་འོག
Tsirang རྩི་རང་རྫོང་ཁག	Gosarling སྒོ་གསར་གླིང་རྒེད་འོག	Dzamlingzor འཛམ་གླིང་ཟོར་སྤྱི་འོག
Tsirang རྩི་རང་རྫོང་ཁག	Gosarling སྒོ་གསར་གླིང་རྒེད་འོག	Pemathang པདྨ་ཐང་སྤྱི་འོག
Tsirang རྩི་རང་རྫོང་ཁག	Gosarling སྒོ་གསར་གླིང་རྒེད་འོག	Pelrithang དཔལ་རི་ཐང་སྤྱི་འོག
Tsirang རྩི་རང་རྫོང་ཁག	Gosarling སྒོ་གསར་གླིང་རྒེད་འོག	Dzamlingthang འཛམ་གླིང་ཐང་སྤྱི་འོག
Tsirang རྩི་རང་རྫོང་ཁག	Kilkhorthang དཀྱིལ་འཁོར་ཐང་རྒེད་འོག	Tashiyangjong བཀྲིས་གཡང་ལྗོངས་སྤྱི་འོག
Tsirang རྩི་རང་རྫོང་ཁག	Kilkhorthang དཀྱིལ་འཁོར་ཐང་རྒེད་འོག	Nyizergang ཉི་ཟེར་སྒང་སྤྱི་འོག
Tsirang རྩི་རང་རྫོང་ཁག	Kilkhorthang དཀྱིལ་འཁོར་ཐང་རྒེད་འོག	Satsangma ས་གཙང་མ་སྤྱི་འོག
Tsirang རྩི་རང་རྫོང་ཁག	Kilkhorthang དཀྱིལ་འཁོར་ཐང་རྒེད་འོག	Dekidling བདེ་སྐྱིད་གླིང་སྤྱི་འོག
Tsirang རྩི་རང་རྫོང་ཁག	Kilkhorthang དཀྱིལ་འཁོར་ཐང་རྒེད་འོག	Maenchhana མན་ཆ་ན་སྤྱི་འོག
Tsirang རྩི་རང་རྫོང་ཁག	Mendrelgang མནྜལ་སྒང་རྒེད་འོག	Mendrelgang མནྜལ་སྒང་སྤྱི་འོག
Tsirang རྩི་རང་རྫོང་ཁག	Mendrelgang མནྜལ་སྒང་རྒེད་འོག	Dzamlingzor འཛམ་གླིན་ཟོར་སྤྱི་འོག
Tsirang རྩི་རང་རྫོང་ཁག	Mendrelgang མནྜལ་སྒང་རྒེད་འོག	Pemashong Samshinggaden པདྨ་ཤོང་བསམ་ཤིང་དགའ་ལྡན་སྤྱི་འོག
Tsirang རྩི་རང་རྫོང་ཁག	Mendrelgang མནྜལ་སྒང་རྒེད་འོག	Tashipang བཀྲིས་སྤང་སྤྱི་འོག
Tsirang རྩི་རང་རྫོང་ཁག	Mendrelgang མནྜལ་སྒང་རྒེད་འོག	Riserboo རི་གསེར་བུ་སྤྱི་འོག
Tsirang རྩི་རང་རྫོང་ཁག	Patshaling པ་ཚ་གླིང་རྒེད་འོག	Pantshaling Toed སྤ་ཚ་གླིང་སྟོད་སྤྱི་འོག
Tsirang རྩི་རང་རྫོང་ཁག	Patshaling པ་ཚ་གླིང་རྒེད་འོག	Pantshaling Maed Tsakaling སྤ་ཚ་གླིང་སྨད་རྩ་ཀ་གླིང་སྤྱི་འོག
Tsirang རྩི་རང་རྫོང་ཁག	Patshaling པ་ཚ་གླིང་རྒེད་འོག	Thakorling མཐའ་སྐོར་གླིང་སྤྱི་འོག
Tsirang རྩི་རང་རྫོང་ཁག	Patshaling པ་ཚ་གླིང་རྒེད་འོག	Chhuzomsa ཆུ་འཛོམས་སའ་སྤྱི་འོག
Tsirang རྩི་རང་རྫོང་ཁག	Patshaling པ་ཚ་གླིང་རྒེད་འོག	Pangthang སྤང་ཐང་སྤྱི་འོག
Tsirang རྩི་རང་རྫོང་ཁག	Phuntenchhu སྤུང་རྟེན་ཆུ་རྒེད་འོག	Serzhong གསེར་གཞོང་སྤྱི་འོག
Tsirang རྩི་རང་རྫོང་ཁག	Phuntenchhu སྤུང་རྟེན་ཆུ་རྒེད་འོག	Norboothang ནོར་བུ་ཐང་སྤྱི་འོག
Tsirang རྩི་རང་རྫོང་ཁག	Phuntenchhu སྤུང་རྟེན་ཆུ་རྒེད་འོག	Tashichhoeling བཀྲིས་ཆོས་གླིང་སྤྱི་འོག
Tsirang རྩི་རང་རྫོང་ཁག	Phuntenchhu སྤུང་རྟེན་ཆུ་རྒེད་འོག	Peljorling དཔལ་འབྱོར་གླིང་སྤྱི་འོག
Tsirang རྩི་རང་རྫོང་ཁག	Phuntenchhu སྤུང་རྟེན་ཆུ་རྒེད་འོག	Goentegkha Tongshinggang དགོམ་སྟེགས་ཁ་སྟོང་ཤིང་སྒང་སྤྱི་འོག
Tsirang རྩི་རང་རྫོང་ཁག	Rangthangling རང་ཐང་གླིང་རྒེད་འོག	Chringma Rangthangling སྐྱ་རིང་མ་རང་ཐང་གླིང་སྤྱི་འོག
Tsirang རྩི་རང་རྫོང་ཁག	Rangthangling རང་ཐང་གླིང་རྒེད་འོག	Neymedsa ནད་མེད་ས་སྤྱི་འོག
Tsirang རྩི་རང་རྫོང་ཁག	Rangthangling རང་ཐང་གླིང་རྒེད་འོག	Darchhargang དར་འཕྱར་སྒང་སྤྱི་འོག
Tsirang རྩི་རང་རྫོང་ཁག	Rangthangling རང་ཐང་གླིང་རྒེད་འོག	Gagaling Nyimazor དགའ་དགའ་གླིང་ཉི་མ་ཟོར་སྤྱི་འོག
Tsirang རྩི་རང་རྫོང་ཁག	Rangthangling རང་ཐང་གླིང་རྒེད་འོག	Soonkosh སུན་ཀོཤ་སྤྱི་འོག
Tsirang རྩི་རང་རྫོང་ཁག	Semjong སེམས་ལྗོངས་རྒེད་འོག	Dekidling བདེ་སྐྱིད་གླིང་སྤྱི་འོག
Tsirang རྩི་རང་རྫོང་ཁག	Semjong སེམས་ལྗོངས་རྒེད་འོག	Dangreygang དྭངས་རས་སྒང་སྤྱི་འོག
Tsirang རྩི་རང་རྫོང་ཁག	Semjong སེམས་ལྗོངས་རྒེད་འོག	Dzomling འཛོམས་གླིང་སྤྱི་འོག
Tsirang རྩི་རང་རྫོང་ཁག	Semjong སེམས་ལྗོངས་རྒེད་འོག	Tashiling Maed བཀྲ་ཤིས་གླིང་སྨད་སྤྱི་འོག
Tsirang རྩི་རང་རྫོང་ཁག	Semjong སེམས་ལྗོངས་རྒེད་འོག	Tashiling Toed བཀྲིས་ཤིས་གླིང་སྟོད་སྤྱི་འོག
Tsirang རྩི་རང་རྫོང་ཁག	Sergithang གསེར་གྱི་ཐང་རྒེད་འོག	Sergithang Toed གསེར་གྱི་ཐང་སྟོད་སྤྱི་འོག
Tsirang རྩི་རང་རྫོང་ཁག	Sergithang གསེར་གྱི་ཐང་རྒེད་འོག	Sergithang Maed གསེར་གྷྱི་ཐང་སྨད་སྤྱི་འོག
Tsirang རྩི་རང་རྫོང་ཁག	Sergithang གསེར་གྱི་ཐང་རྒེད་འོག	Norboogang ནོར་བུ་སྒང་སྤྱི་འོག
Tsirang རྩི་རང་རྫོང་ཁག	Sergithang གསེར་གྱི་ཐང་རྒེད་འོག	Tashithang བཀྲིས་ཐང་སྤྱི་འོག
Tsirang རྩི་རང་རྫོང་ཁག	Sergithang གསེར་གྱི་ཐང་རྒེད་འོག	Semdenjong སེམས་ལྡན་ལྗོངས་སྤྱི་འོག
Tsirang རྩི་རང་རྫོང་ཁག	Tsholingkhar མཚོ་གླིང་མཁར་རྒེད་འོག	Tsholingkhar Maed མཚོ་གླིང་ཁར་སྟོད་སྤྱི་འོག
Tsirang རྩི་རང་རྫོང་ཁག	Tsholingkhar མཚོ་གླིང་མཁར་རྒེད་འོག	Tsholingkhar Toed མཚོ་གླིང་ཁར་སྟོད་སྤྱི་འོག
Tsirang རྩི་རང་རྫོང་ཁག	Tsholingkhar མཚོ་གླིང་མཁར་རྒེད་འོག	Droobchhugang ཁྲུབ་ཆུ་སྒང་སྤྱི་འོག
Tsirang རྩི་རང་རྫོང་ཁག	Tsholingkhar མཚོ་གླིང་མཁར་རྒེད་འོག	Kapazhing ཀ་པ་ཞིང་སྤྱི་འོག
Tsirang རྩི་རང་རྫོང་ཁག	Tsholingkhar མཚོ་གླིང་མཁར་རྒེད་འོག	Gomsoom སྒོམ་གསུམ་སྤྱི་འོག
Tsirang རྩི་རང་རྫོང་ཁག	Tsirang Toed རྩི་རང་སྟོད་རྒེད་འོག	Tsirang Toed ཙི་རང་སྟོད་སྤྱི་འོག
Tsirang རྩི་རང་རྫོང་ཁག	Tsirang Toed རྩི་རང་སྟོད་རྒེད་འོག	Kabelzhing ཀ་བལ་ཞིང་སྤྱི་འོག
Tsirang རྩི་རང་རྫོང་ཁག	Tsirang Toed རྩི་རང་སྟོད་རྒེད་འོག	Tongshingnang སྟོང་ཤིང་ནང་སྤྱི་འོག
Tsirang རྩི་རང་རྫོང་ཁག	Tsirang Toed རྩི་རང་སྟོད་རྒེད་འོག	Soentabsa སོན་བཏབ་ས་སྤྱི་འོག
Tsirang རྩི་རང་རྫོང་ཁག	Tsirang Toed རྩི་རང་སྟོད་རྒེད་འོག	Tagthang Wangphoo སྟག་ཐང་ཝང་ཕུ་སྤྱི་འོག

=== Wangdue Phodrang District ===
Dzongkhag	Gewog	Chiwog
Wangdue Phodrang དབང་འདུས་ཕོ་བྲང་རྫོང་ཁག	Athang ཨ་ཐང་རྒེད་འོག	Lomtshokha ལོམ་ཚོ་ཁ་སྤྱི་འོག
Wangdue Phodrang དབང་འདུས་ཕོ་བྲང་རྫོང་ཁག	Athang ཨ་ཐང་རྒེད་འོག	Jaroggang Dzawa བྱ་རོགས་སྒང་རྫ་བ་སྤྱི་འོག
Wangdue Phodrang དབང་འདུས་ཕོ་བྲང་རྫོང་ཁག	Athang ཨ་ཐང་རྒེད་འོག	Lophokha Pagtakha ལོ་པོ་ཁ་ཕག་ཏ་ཁ་སྤྱི་འོག
Wangdue Phodrang དབང་འདུས་ཕོ་བྲང་རྫོང་ཁག	Athang ཨ་ཐང་རྒེད་འོག	Rookha རུ་ཁ་སྤྱི་འོག
Wangdue Phodrang དབང་འདུས་ཕོ་བྲང་རྫོང་ཁག	Athang ཨ་ཐང་རྒེད་འོག	Lawa Lamga ལ་ཝ་ལམ་ག་སྤྱི་འོག
Wangdue Phodrang དབང་འདུས་ཕོ་བྲང་རྫོང་ཁག	Bjendag སྦྱེད་ནག་རྒེད་འོག	Bjednagloongpa Thingmakha སྦྱེད་ནག་ལུང་པ་མཐིང་མ་ཁ་སྤྱི་འོག
Wangdue Phodrang དབང་འདུས་ཕོ་བྲང་རྫོང་ཁག	Bjendag སྦྱེད་ནག་རྒེད་འོག	Tashitokha བཀྲ་ཤིས་ལྟོ་ཁ་སྤྱི་འོག
Wangdue Phodrang དབང་འདུས་ཕོ་བྲང་རྫོང་ཁག	Bjendag སྦྱེད་ནག་རྒེད་འོག	Wachhey ཝ་ཆས་སྤྱི་འོག
Wangdue Phodrang དབང་འདུས་ཕོ་བྲང་རྫོང་ཁག	Bjendag སྦྱེད་ནག་རྒེད་འོག	Garzhikha Omchheygang སྒར་གཞི་ཁ་ཨོམ་ཆེ་སྒང་སྤྱི་འོག
Wangdue Phodrang དབང་འདུས་ཕོ་བྲང་རྫོང་ཁག	Bjendag སྦྱེད་ནག་རྒེད་འོག	Ngawang Tongchennang ངག་དབང་སྟོང་ཅན་ནང་སྤྱི་འོག
Wangdue Phodrang དབང་འདུས་ཕོ་བྲང་རྫོང་ཁག	Darkar དར་དཀར་རྒེད་འོག	Umakha Toed ཨུ་མ་ཁ་སྟོད་སྤྱི་འོག
Wangdue Phodrang དབང་འདུས་ཕོ་བྲང་རྫོང་ཁག	Darkar དར་དཀར་རྒེད་འོག	Kamichhu Umakha Maed ཀ་མི་ཆུ་ཨུ་མ་ཁ་སྨད་སྤྱི་འོག
Wangdue Phodrang དབང་འདུས་ཕོ་བྲང་རྫོང་ཁག	Darkar དར་དཀར་རྒེད་འོག	Kamina Wogyal ཀ་མི་ན་འོ་བརྒྱལ་སྤྱི་འོག
Wangdue Phodrang དབང་འདུས་ཕོ་བྲང་རྫོང་ཁག	Darkar དར་དཀར་རྒེད་འོག	Gyapakha རྒྱས་པ་ཁ་སྤྱི་འོག
Wangdue Phodrang དབང་འདུས་ཕོ་བྲང་རྫོང་ཁག	Darkar དར་དཀར་རྒེད་འོག	Sili Taagsha སི་ལི་སྟག་ཤ་སྤྱི་འོག
Wangdue Phodrang དབང་འདུས་ཕོ་བྲང་རྫོང་ཁག	Dangchu དྭངས་ཆུ་རྒེད་འོག	Godraang Taagsar གོ་བྲང་སྟག་གསར་སྤྱི་འོག
Wangdue Phodrang དབང་འདུས་ཕོ་བྲང་རྫོང་ཁག	Dangchu དྭངས་ཆུ་རྒེད་འོག	Tokaling Tomla ལྟོ་ཀ་གླིང་སྟོམ་ལ་སྤྱི་འོག
Wangdue Phodrang དབང་འདུས་ཕོ་བྲང་རྫོང་ཁག	Dangchu དྭངས་ཆུ་རྒེད་འོག	Tashidingkha Zimi བཀྲིས་ལྡིང་ཁ་ཟི་མི་སྤྱི་འོག
Wangdue Phodrang དབང་འདུས་ཕོ་བྲང་རྫོང་ཁག	Dangchu དྭངས་ཆུ་རྒེད་འོག	Uesagang གཨུས་ས་སྒང་སྤྱི་འོག
Wangdue Phodrang དབང་འདུས་ཕོ་བྲང་རྫོང་ཁག	Dangchu དྭངས་ཆུ་རྒེད་འོག	Doongdoongnyelsa Norbooding དུང་དུང་ཉལ་ས་ནོར་བུ་ལྡིང་སྤྱི་འོག
Wangdue Phodrang དབང་འདུས་ཕོ་བྲང་རྫོང་ཁག	Gangteng སྒང་སྟེང་རྒེད་འོག	Jangchen Koomboo བྱང་ཅན་ཀུམ་བུ་སྤྱི་འོག
Wangdue Phodrang དབང་འདུས་ཕོ་བྲང་རྫོང་ཁག	Gangteng སྒང་སྟེང་རྒེད་འོག	Gangteng སྒང་སྟེང་སྤྱི་འོག
Wangdue Phodrang དབང་འདུས་ཕོ་བྲང་རྫོང་ཁག	Gangteng སྒང་སྟེང་རྒེད་འོག	Yaekorwog གཡས་བསྐོར་འོག་སྤྱི་འོག
Wangdue Phodrang དབང་འདུས་ཕོ་བྲང་རྫོང་ཁག	Gangteng སྒང་སྟེང་རྒེད་འོག	Tapaiteng Uega རྟ་མའི་སྟེང་གཡུལ་ག་སྤྱི་འོག
Wangdue Phodrang དབང་འདུས་ཕོ་བྲང་རྫོང་ཁག	Gangteng སྒང་སྟེང་རྒེད་འོག	Gorgoen སྒོར་དགོན་སྤྱི་འོག
Wangdue Phodrang དབང་འདུས་ཕོ་བྲང་རྫོང་ཁག	Gasetsho Gom དགའ་སེང་ཚོ་གོངམ་རྒེད་འོག	Changche Matshigpogto ལྕང་ཅེ་མ་འཚིག་སྤོག་ཏོ་སྤྱི་འོག
Wangdue Phodrang དབང་འདུས་ཕོ་བྲང་རྫོང་ཁག	Gasetsho Gom དགའ་སེང་ཚོ་གོངམ་རྒེད་འོག	Khamaedna ཁ་སྨད་ན་སྤྱི་འོག
Wangdue Phodrang དབང་འདུས་ཕོ་བྲང་རྫོང་ཁག	Gasetsho Gom དགའ་སེང་ཚོ་གོངམ་རྒེད་འོག	Khatoedkha ཁ་སྟོད་ཁ་སྤྱི་འོག
Wangdue Phodrang དབང་འདུས་ཕོ་བྲང་རྫོང་ཁག	Gasetsho Gom དགའ་སེང་ཚོ་གོངམ་རྒེད་འོག	Changkha ལྕང་ཁ་སྤྱི་འོག
Wangdue Phodrang དབང་འདུས་ཕོ་བྲང་རྫོང་ཁག	Gasetsho Gom དགའ་སེང་ཚོ་གོངམ་རྒེད་འོག	Dabchhaykha Matshigkha གྲབ་ཅས་ཁ་མ་འཚིག་ཁ་སྤྱི་འོག
Wangdue Phodrang དབང་འདུས་ཕོ་བྲང་རྫོང་ཁག	Gasetsho Wom དགའ་སེང་ཆོ་འོགམ་རྒེད་འོག	Shingkheykha Toed ཤིང་འཁོད་ཁ་སྟོད་སྤྱི་འོག
Wangdue Phodrang དབང་འདུས་ཕོ་བྲང་རྫོང་ཁག	Gasetsho Wom དགའ་སེང་ཆོ་འོགམ་རྒེད་འོག	Singkheykha Maed ཤིང་འགོད་ཁ་སྨད་སྤྱི་འོག
Wangdue Phodrang དབང་འདུས་ཕོ་བྲང་རྫོང་ཁག	Gasetsho Wom དགའ་སེང་ཆོ་འོགམ་རྒེད་འོག	Medpaisa Taabchhaekha མེད་པའི་ས་བཏབ་ཆས་ཁ་སྤྱི་འོག
Wangdue Phodrang དབང་འདུས་ཕོ་བྲང་རྫོང་ཁག	Gasetsho Wom དགའ་སེང་ཆོ་འོགམ་རྒེད་འོག	Haetshokha ཧས་ཆོ་ཁ་སྤྱི་འོག
Wangdue Phodrang དབང་འདུས་ཕོ་བྲང་རྫོང་ཁག	Gasetsho Wom དགའ་སེང་ཆོ་འོགམ་རྒེད་འོག	Haebisa ཧས་སྦིས་ས་སྤྱི་འོག
Wangdue Phodrang དབང་འདུས་ཕོ་བྲང་རྫོང་ཁག	Kazhi ཀ་གཞི་རྒེད་འོག	Baedrog སྦས་འབྲོག་སྤྱི་འོག
Wangdue Phodrang དབང་འདུས་ཕོ་བྲང་རྫོང་ཁག	Kazhi ཀ་གཞི་རྒེད་འོག	Lengbi ལེང་སྦིས་སྤྱི་འོག
Wangdue Phodrang དབང་འདུས་ཕོ་བྲང་རྫོང་ཁག	Kazhi ཀ་གཞི་རྒེད་འོག	Komathrang ཀོ་མ་ཕྲང་སྤྱི་འོག
Wangdue Phodrang དབང་འདུས་ཕོ་བྲང་རྫོང་ཁག	Kazhi ཀ་གཞི་རྒེད་འོག	Kazhi ཀ་གཞི་སྤྱི་འོག
Wangdue Phodrang དབང་འདུས་ཕོ་བྲང་རྫོང་ཁག	Kazhi ཀ་གཞི་རྒེད་འོག	Chegidp ཅེ་དགྱིདཔ་སྤྱི་འོག
Wangdue Phodrang དབང་འདུས་ཕོ་བྲང་རྫོང་ཁག	Nahi ན་ཧི་རྒེད་འོག	Nagbisa ནག་སྦིས་ས་སྤྱི་འོག
Wangdue Phodrang དབང་འདུས་ཕོ་བྲང་རྫོང་ཁག	Nahi ན་ཧི་རྒེད་འོག	Uesagongm Thabji གཡུས་ས་གོངམ་ཐབ་སྦྱིས་སྤྱི་འོག
Wangdue Phodrang དབང་འདུས་ཕོ་བྲང་རྫོང་ཁག	Nahi ན་ཧི་རྒེད་འོག	Haebisa ཧས་སྦིས་ས་སྤྱི་འོག
Wangdue Phodrang དབང་འདུས་ཕོ་བྲང་རྫོང་ཁག	Nahi ན་ཧི་རྒེད་འོག	Khoorjoongla Langmizi ཁུར་འབྱུང་ལ་བླང་མི་ཟི་སྤྱི་འོག
Wangdue Phodrang དབང་འདུས་ཕོ་བྲང་རྫོང་ཁག	Nahi ན་ཧི་རྒེད་འོག	Halued Uesawogm ཧ་ལུད་གཡུས་ས་འོགམ་སྤྱི་འོག
Wangdue Phodrang དབང་འདུས་ཕོ་བྲང་རྫོང་ཁག	Nyisho ཉི་ཤོག་རྒེད་འོག	Goensar Rajawog དགོན་གསར་ར་ཛ་འོག་སྤྱི་འོག
Wangdue Phodrang དབང་འདུས་ཕོ་བྲང་རྫོང་ཁག	Nyisho ཉི་ཤོག་རྒེད་འོག	Gangjab སྒང་རྒྱབ་སྤྱི་འོག
Wangdue Phodrang དབང་འདུས་ཕོ་བྲང་རྫོང་ཁག	Nyisho ཉི་ཤོག་རྒེད་འོག	Chitokha Pangkha སྤྱི་ཏོ་ཁ་སྤང་ཁ་སྤྱི་འོག
Wangdue Phodrang དབང་འདུས་ཕོ་བྲང་རྫོང་ཁག	Nyisho ཉི་ཤོག་རྒེད་འོག	Samtengang བསམ་གཏང་སྒང་སྤྱི་འོག
Wangdue Phodrang དབང་འདུས་ཕོ་བྲང་རྫོང་ཁག	Nyisho ཉི་ཤོག་རྒེད་འོག	Geylegkha Kuenzangling དགེ་ལེགས་ཁ་ཀུན་བཟང་གླིང་སྤྱི་འོག
Wangdue Phodrang དབང་འདུས་ཕོ་བྲང་རྫོང་ཁག	Nyisho ཉི་ཤོག་རྒེད་འོག	Chhaebhakha ཆས་བྷ་ཁ་སྤྱི་འོག
Wangdue Phodrang དབང་འདུས་ཕོ་བྲང་རྫོང་ཁག	Phangyul ཕངས་ཡུལ་རྒེད་འོག	Uesargang Wampoekhar གཡུས་གསར་སྒང་འམ་སྤོད་ཁ་སྤྱི་འོག
Wangdue Phodrang དབང་འདུས་ཕོ་བྲང་རྫོང་ཁག	Phangyul ཕངས་ཡུལ་རྒེད་འོག	Chhungserkha Domkha ཁྱུང་སེར་ཁ་དོམ་ཁ་སྤྱི་འོག
Wangdue Phodrang དབང་འདུས་ཕོ་བྲང་རྫོང་ཁག	Phangyul ཕངས་ཡུལ་རྒེད་འོག	Chhunggoen ཁྱུང་དགོན་སྤྱི་འོག
Wangdue Phodrang དབང་འདུས་ཕོ་བྲང་རྫོང་ཁག	Phangyul ཕངས་ཡུལ་རྒེད་འོག	Goenkhar དགོན་ཁར་སྤྱི་འོག
Wangdue Phodrang དབང་འདུས་ཕོ་བྲང་རྫོང་ཁག	Phangyul ཕངས་ཡུལ་རྒེད་འོག	Koomchhi Phangyuel ཀུམ་ཆི་ཕངས་ཡུལ་སྤྱི་འོག
Wangdue Phodrang དབང་འདུས་ཕོ་བྲང་རྫོང་ཁག	Phobji ཕོབ་སྦྱིས་རྒེད་འོག	Damchhoe Gangphel དམ་ཆོས་སྒང་འཕེལ་སྤྱི་འོག
Wangdue Phodrang དབང་འདུས་ཕོ་བྲང་རྫོང་ཁག	Phobji ཕོབ་སྦྱིས་རྒེད་འོག	Dogsenang Gorphoog དོགས་སེ་ནང་སྒོར་ཕུག་སྤྱི་འོག
Wangdue Phodrang དབང་འདུས་ཕོ་བྲང་རྫོང་ཁག	Phobji ཕོབ་སྦྱིས་རྒེད་འོག	Drangpa Pangsar དྲང་པ་སྤང་གསར་སྤྱི་འོག
Wangdue Phodrang དབང་འདུས་ཕོ་བྲང་རྫོང་ཁག	Phobji ཕོབ་སྦྱིས་རྒེད་འོག	Khemdro Nemphel ཁྱེམ་འཀྲོ་ནེམ་འཕེལ་སྤྱི་འོག
Wangdue Phodrang དབང་འདུས་ཕོ་བྲང་རྫོང་ཁག	Phobji ཕོབ་སྦྱིས་རྒེད་འོག	Talachen Tawa Taphoog རྟ་ལ་ཅན་ལྟ་བ་རྟ་ཕུག་པ་སྤྱི་འོག
Wangdue Phodrang དབང་འདུས་ཕོ་བྲང་རྫོང་ཁག	Ruepisa རུས་སྦིས་ས་རྒེད་འོག	Zamding ཟམ་ལྡིང་སྤྱི་འོག
Wangdue Phodrang དབང་འདུས་ཕོ་བྲང་རྫོང་ཁག	Ruepisa རུས་སྦིས་ས་རྒེད་འོག	Bangtoedkha བང་སྟོད་ཁ་སྤྱི་འོག
Wangdue Phodrang དབང་འདུས་ཕོ་བྲང་རྫོང་ཁག	Ruepisa རུས་སྦིས་ས་རྒེད་འོག	Bjagphug བྱག་ཕུག་སྤྱི་འོག
Wangdue Phodrang དབང་འདུས་ཕོ་བྲང་རྫོང་ཁག	Ruepisa རུས་སྦིས་ས་རྒེད་འོག	Gyala རྒྱ་ལ་སྤྱི་འོག
Wangdue Phodrang དབང་འདུས་ཕོ་བྲང་རྫོང་ཁག	Ruepisa རུས་སྦིས་ས་རྒེད་འོག	Oola ཨུ་ལ་སྤྱི་འོག
Wangdue Phodrang དབང་འདུས་ཕོ་བྲང་རྫོང་ཁག	Ruepisa རུས་སྦིས་ས་རྒེད་འོག	Khothangkha མཁོ་ཐང་ཁ་སྤྱི་འོག
Wangdue Phodrang དབང་འདུས་ཕོ་བྲང་རྫོང་ཁག	Sephu སྲས་ཕུག་རྒེད་འོག	Booso Zeri བུ་གསོ་ཟེ་རི་སྤྱི་འོག
Wangdue Phodrang དབང་འདུས་ཕོ་བྲང་རྫོང་ཁག	Sephu སྲས་ཕུག་རྒེད་འོག	Longtoed གློང་སྟོད་སྤྱི་འོག
Wangdue Phodrang དབང་འདུས་ཕོ་བྲང་རྫོང་ཁག	Sephu སྲས་ཕུག་རྒེད་འོག	Boommilog བུ་མོ་མི་ལོག་སྤྱི་འོག
Wangdue Phodrang དབང་འདུས་ཕོ་བྲང་རྫོང་ཁག	Sephu སྲས་ཕུག་རྒེད་འོག	Nakha ན་ཁ་སྤྱི་འོག
Wangdue Phodrang དབང་འདུས་ཕོ་བྲང་རྫོང་ཁག	Sephu སྲས་ཕུག་རྒེད་འོག	Rukoobji རུ་ཀུབ་སྦྱིས་སྤྱི་འོག
Wangdue Phodrang དབང་འདུས་ཕོ་བྲང་རྫོང་ཁག	Thedtsho ཐེད་ཚོ་རྒེད་འོག	Martaloongchu དམར་ཏ་ལུང་ཅུ་སྤྱི་འོག
Wangdue Phodrang དབང་འདུས་ཕོ་བྲང་རྫོང་ཁག	Thedtsho ཐེད་ཚོ་རྒེད་འོག	Thanggoo ཐང་མགུ་སྤྱི་འོག
Wangdue Phodrang དབང་འདུས་ཕོ་བྲང་རྫོང་ཁག	Thedtsho ཐེད་ཚོ་རྒེད་འོག	Wangjokha ཝང་ཇོ་ཁ་སྤྱི་འོག
Wangdue Phodrang དབང་འདུས་ཕོ་བྲང་རྫོང་ཁག	Thedtsho ཐེད་ཚོ་རྒེད་འོག	Jang Rinchhengang བྱང་རིན་ཆེན་སྒང་སྤྱི་འོག
Wangdue Phodrang དབང་འདུས་ཕོ་བྲང་རྫོང་ཁག	Thedtsho ཐེད་ཚོ་རྒེད་འོག	Lho Rinchhengang ལྷོ་རིན་ཆེན་སྒང་སྤྱི་འོག

=== Zhemgang District ===
Dzongkhag	Gewog	Chiwog
Zhemgang གཞམས་སྒང་རྫོང་ཁག	Bardo བར་རྡོ་རྒེད་འོག	Bardo བར་དོ་སྤྱི་འོག
Zhemgang གཞམས་སྒང་རྫོང་ཁག	Bardo བར་རྡོ་རྒེད་འོག	Khomshar ཁོམ་ཤར་སྤྱི་འོག
Zhemgang གཞམས་སྒང་རྫོང་ཁག	Bardo བར་རྡོ་རྒེད་འོག	Phulabi ཕུལ་སྦིས་སྤྱི་འོག
Zhemgang གཞམས་སྒང་རྫོང་ཁག	Bardo བར་རྡོ་རྒེད་འོག	Langdorbi གླང་དོར་སྦིས་སྤྱི་འོག
Zhemgang གཞམས་སྒང་རྫོང་ཁག	Bardo བར་རྡོ་རྒེད་འོག	Digala དི་ག་ལ་སྤྱི་འོག
Zhemgang གཞམས་སྒང་རྫོང་ཁག	Bjoka འབྱོག་ཀ་རྒེད་འོག	Dali ད་ལི་སྤྱི་འོག
Zhemgang གཞམས་སྒང་རྫོང་ཁག	Bjoka འབྱོག་ཀ་རྒེད་འོག	Bjokar འབྱོག་དཀར་སྤྱི་འོག
Zhemgang གཞམས་སྒང་རྫོང་ཁག	Bjoka འབྱོག་ཀ་རྒེད་འོག	Kamati ཀ་མ་ཏི་སྤྱི་འོག
Zhemgang གཞམས་སྒང་རྫོང་ཁག	Bjoka འབྱོག་ཀ་རྒེད་འོག	Sarpong Namirgang བར་སྤོང་ན་མིར་སྒང་སྤྱི་འོག
Zhemgang གཞམས་སྒང་རྫོང་ཁག	Bjoka འབྱོག་ཀ་རྒེད་འོག	Chabdenba Dzarkabla སྐྱབས་བདེན་སྦ་ཛར་བཀབ་ལ་སྤྱི་འོག
Zhemgang གཞམས་སྒང་རྫོང་ཁག	Goshing སྒོ་ཤིང་རྒེད་འོག	Mewangang མེ་དབང་སྒང་སྤྱི་འོག
Zhemgang གཞམས་སྒང་རྫོང་ཁག	Goshing སྒོ་ཤིང་རྒེད་འོག	Budhashi བུ་ད་ཤི་སྤྱི་འོག
Zhemgang གཞམས་སྒང་རྫོང་ཁག	Goshing སྒོ་ཤིང་རྒེད་འོག	Lamthang ལམ་ཐང་སྤྱི་འོག
Zhemgang གཞམས་སྒང་རྫོང་ཁག	Goshing སྒོ་ཤིང་རྒེད་འོག	Lingmapong Samchhoeling གླིང་མ་སྤོང་བསམས་ཆོས་གླིང་སྤྱི་འོག
Zhemgang གཞམས་སྒང་རྫོང་ཁག	Goshing སྒོ་ཤིང་རྒེད་འོག	Lichibi ལི་ཅི་སྦིས་སྤྱི་འོག
Zhemgang གཞམས་སྒང་རྫོང་ཁག	Nangkor ནང་སྐོར་རྒེད་འོག	Dakphel Tali བདག་འཕེལ་ཏ་ལི་སྤྱི་འོག
Zhemgang གཞམས་སྒང་རྫོང་ཁག	Nangkor ནང་སྐོར་རྒེད་འོག	Buli བུ་ལི་སྤྱི་འོག
Zhemgang གཞམས་སྒང་རྫོང་ཁག	Nangkor ནང་སྐོར་རྒེད་འོག	Goleng མགོ་ལེངས་སྤྱི་འོག
Zhemgang གཞམས་སྒང་རྫོང་ཁག	Nangkor ནང་སྐོར་རྒེད་འོག	Nyakha ཉ་མཁའ་སྤྱི་འོག
Zhemgang གཞམས་སྒང་རྫོང་ཁག	Nangkor ནང་སྐོར་རྒེད་འོག	Duenmang མདུན་མང་སྤྱི་འོག
Zhemgang གཞམས་སྒང་རྫོང་ཁག	Ngangla ངང་ལ་རྒེད་འོག	Kagtong བཀག་སྟོང་སྤྱི་འོག
Zhemgang གཞམས་སྒང་རྫོང་ཁག	Ngangla ངང་ལ་རྒེད་འོག	Ngangla Trong ངང་ལ་ཀྲོང་སྤྱི་འོག
Zhemgang གཞམས་སྒང་རྫོང་ཁག	Ngangla ངང་ལ་རྒེད་འོག	Ribati རི་བ་ཏི་སྤྱི་འོག
Zhemgang གཞམས་སྒང་རྫོང་ཁག	Ngangla ངང་ལ་རྒེད་འོག	Marangduet མ་རང་འདུད་སྤྱི་འོག
Zhemgang གཞམས་སྒང་རྫོང་ཁག	Ngangla ངང་ལ་རྒེད་འོག	Panbang Sonamthang སྤན་བང་བསོད་ནམས་ཐང་སྤྱི་འོག
Zhemgang གཞམས་སྒང་རྫོང་ཁག	Phangkhar ཕང་མཁར་རྒེད་འོག	Rongchola Dadijong སྤོང་ཅོ་ལ་སྤྲ་སྡི་ལྗོངས་སྤྱི་འོག
Zhemgang གཞམས་སྒང་རྫོང་ཁག	Phangkhar ཕང་མཁར་རྒེད་འོག	Mamong Trong Pantang མ་མོང་ཀྲོང་སྤན་སྟང་སྤྱི་འོག
Zhemgang གཞམས་སྒང་རྫོང་ཁག	Phangkhar ཕང་མཁར་རྒེད་འོག	Panabi པཱ་ན་སྦིས་སྤྱི་འོག
Zhemgang གཞམས་སྒང་རྫོང་ཁག	Phangkhar ཕང་མཁར་རྒེད་འོག	Shalingtoed Tashibi ཤ་གླིང་སྟད་བཀྲིས་སྦིས་སྤྱི་འོག
Zhemgang གཞམས་སྒང་རྫོང་ཁག	Phangkhar ཕང་མཁར་རྒེད་འོག	Chargngarzam ལྕགས་ངར་ཟམ་སྤྱི་འོག
Zhemgang གཞམས་སྒང་རྫོང་ཁག	Shingkhar ཤིང་མཁར་རྒེད་འོག	Singkhar ཤིང་མགྷར་སྤྱི་འོག
Zhemgang གཞམས་སྒང་རྫོང་ཁག	Shingkhar ཤིང་མཁར་རྒེད་འོག	Wamling ཝམ་གླིང་སྤྱི་འོག
Zhemgang གཞམས་སྒང་རྫོང་ཁག	Shingkhar ཤིང་མཁར་རྒེད་འོག	Thrisa ཁྲི་ས་སྤྱི་འོག
Zhemgang གཞམས་སྒང་རྫོང་ཁག	Shingkhar ཤིང་མཁར་རྒེད་འོག	Radi རཱ་སྡི་སྤྱི་འོག
Zhemgang གཞམས་སྒང་རྫོང་ཁག	Shingkhar ཤིང་མཁར་རྒེད་འོག	Nyimzong Thajong ཉིམ་གཞོང་མཐའ་ལྗོངས་སྤྱི་འོག
Zhemgang གཞམས་སྒང་རྫོང་ཁག	Trong ཀྲོང་རྒེད་འོག	Dangkhar Trong དང་མཁར་ཀྲོང་སྤྱི་འོག
Zhemgang གཞམས་སྒང་རྫོང་ཁག	Trong ཀྲོང་རྒེད་འོག	Berti Tagma བེར་ཏི་སྟག་མ་སྤྱི་འོག
Zhemgang གཞམས་སྒང་རྫོང་ཁག	Trong ཀྲོང་རྒེད་འོག	Tshanglajong Zurphel ཚང་ལ་ལྗོངས་ཟུར་འཕེལ་སྤྱི་འོག
Zhemgang གཞམས་སྒང་རྫོང་ཁག	Trong ཀྲོང་རྒེད་འོག	Soobdrang བསྲུབ་བྲང་སྤྱི་འོག
Zhemgang གཞམས་སྒང་རྫོང་ཁག	Trong ཀྲོང་རྒེད་འོག	Gongphu གོང་ཕུ་སྤྱི་འོག

== See also ==
- Gewog
- Thromde
- List of villages in Bhutan
