= List of Buddhist temples in Bhutan =

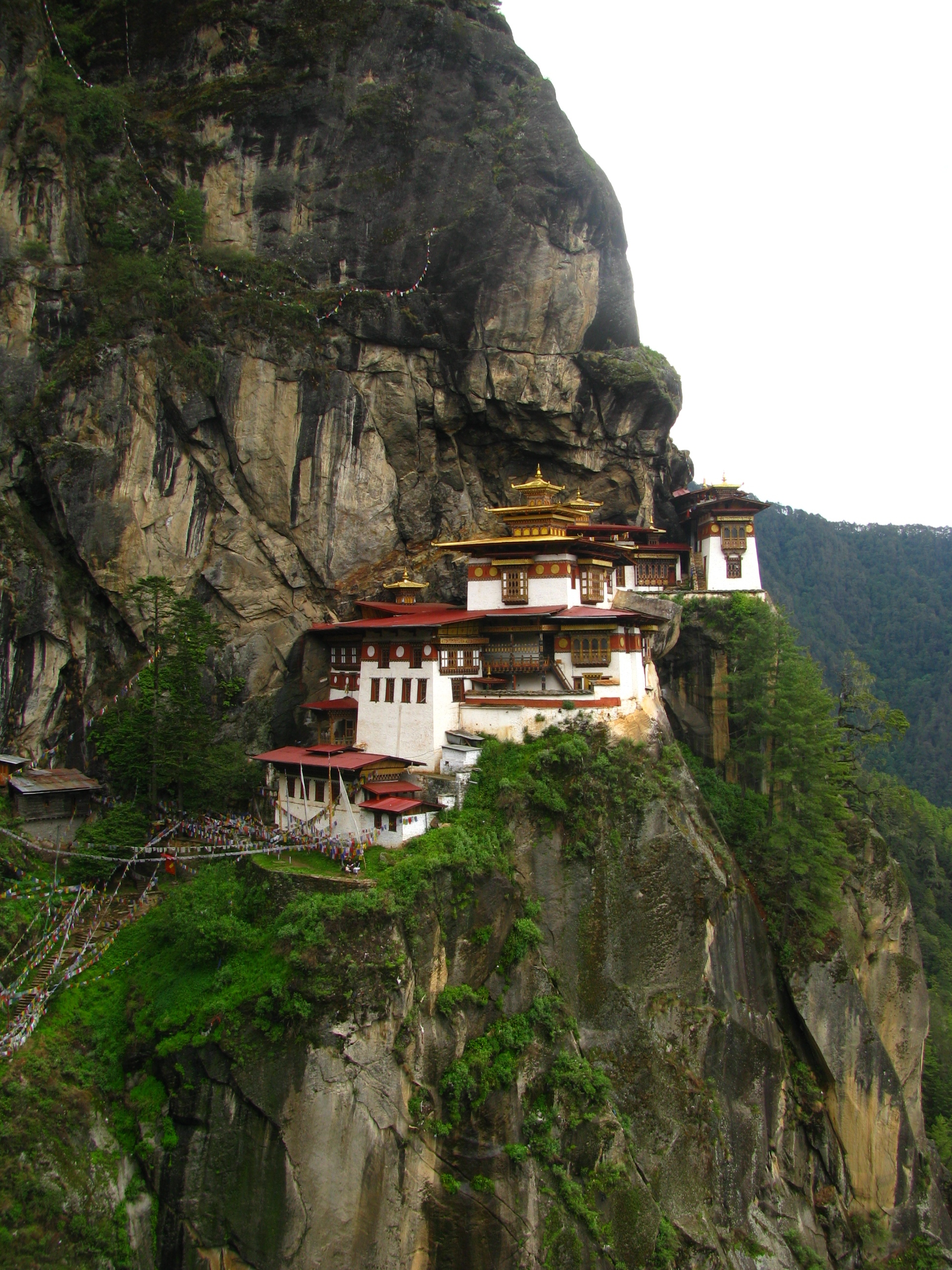
Paro Taktsang (Tiger's Nest)

This is a list of Buddhist temples, monasteries, stupas, and pagodas in Bhutan for which there are Wikipedia articles, sorted by location.

== Bumthang ==
- Kurjey Lhakhang – one of Bhutan's most sacred temples – image of Guru Rinopche enshrined in rock.
- Tamzhing Monastery
- Tharpaling Monastery
- Jambay Lhakhang

== Chhukha ==
- Dokhachu Goenpa
- Geling Goenpa
- Thadra Goenpa
- Zangdo Pelri Lhakhang
- Kharbandi Monastery

== Paro ==
- Kyichu Lhakhang
- Paro Taktsang (Tiger's Nest) – perched on a 1,200 meter cliff, this is one of Bhutan's most spectacular monasteries.
- Rinpung Dzong
- Gomdrak Monastery
- Ragoe Monastery
- Dzongdrakha Monastery
- Drakarpo Monastery
- Chumphu Monastery
- Bumdrak Monastery
- Dranja Gonpa Monastery
- Dumtseg Lhakhang
- Gorina Lhakhang
- Jabar Goenpa Lhakhang
- Pangbisa Lhakhang
- Ragoed Lhakhang
- Sangchen Choekhor Lhakhang
- Siluna Lhakhang
- Tamchoe Lhakhang
- Ugyen Guru Lhakhang
- Zuri lhakhang

== Pemagatshel ==
- Yongla Goenpa
- Kheri Goenpa
- Jashar Goenpa
- Ngangshing Lhakhang

== Punakha ==
- Punakha Dzong – constructed by Zhabdrung Ngawang Namgyal in 1637–38 it is the head monastery of the Southern Drukpa Kagyu school.
- Chimi Lhakhang

== Thimphu ==
- Chagri Monastery
- Dechen Phodrang Monastery
- Memorial Chorten/ Gongsar Chorten built in the memory of the Third King Jigme Dorji Wangchuck.
- Phajoding Monastery
- Tashichhoe Dzong
- Buddha Dordenma Statue
- Chang Gangkha Lhakhang
- Tharana Monastery
- Tashigang Monastery
- Pchezhe Goenpa
- Tango Monastery
- Pangrizampa Lhakhang
- Barp Lhakhang
- Wangduetse Lhakhang

== Trashigang ==
- Chador Lhakhang

== Trashiyangtse ==
- Chorten Kora
- Gomphu Kora

== Trongsa ==
- Chendebji Chorten
- Nabji Lhakhang

== Wangdue Phodrang ==
- Gangteng Monastery

== See also ==
- Buddha Dordenma statue
- Buddhism in Bhutan
- Dratshang Lhentshog
- Dzong architecture
- Membartsho
- Architecture of Bhutan
- List of Buddhist temples
