= Rigsum Monastery =

Buddhist monastery in Trashiyangtse, Bhutan

- Location within Bhutan

Religion
- Affiliation: Tibetan Buddhism

Location
- Location: Trashiyangtse District, Bhutan
- Country: Bhutan
- Coordinates: 27°41′35″N 91°27′33″E

Rigsum Monastery (Dzongkha: རིགས་གསུམ་དགོན་པ།, romanized: Rigsum Goenpa) is a Buddhist monastery in Bumdeling Gewog, Trashiyangtse district, Bhutan.

== Location ==
The monastery is located in a hill in the Bumdeling Gewog in Eastern Bhutan, about 4 hours by foot from the town of Taripe. It sits at approximately 2900 metres of elevation, overlooking the Trashi Yangtse dzong and the Bumdeling Valley.

== History ==
The monastery was built under Lama Tshering Gyamtsho, a disciple of Shacha Rinchhen. Today it hosts a religious school with approximately 40 monks in it.
