= Duksum =

- Location in Bhutan
- Coordinates: 27°25′12″N 91°35′24″E
- Country: Bhutan
- District: Trashiyangtse District

Population (2005)
  - Total: 283

Duksum, also known in the past as Doksum, Dogsum or Dosum is a village in north-eastern Bhutan. It is located in Khamdang Gewog in Trashiyangtse District. By road it is 21 km. from Trashigang town and only 2 km. from the well known religious site of Gomphu Kora. Duksum was famous for its ancient Chazam (iron suspension bridge), which was, however, dismantled in 2004 for restoration. Originally built by lama Thang Tong Gyalpo, it was rebuilt after 2004 at Tamchog Lhakhang near Paro. The township of Duksum was mainly a trading post for nearby, off-the-road settlements. Its importance declined with the extension of rural roads and especially because of a heavy rockfall of 2004 which destroyed many shops, restaurants and houses.

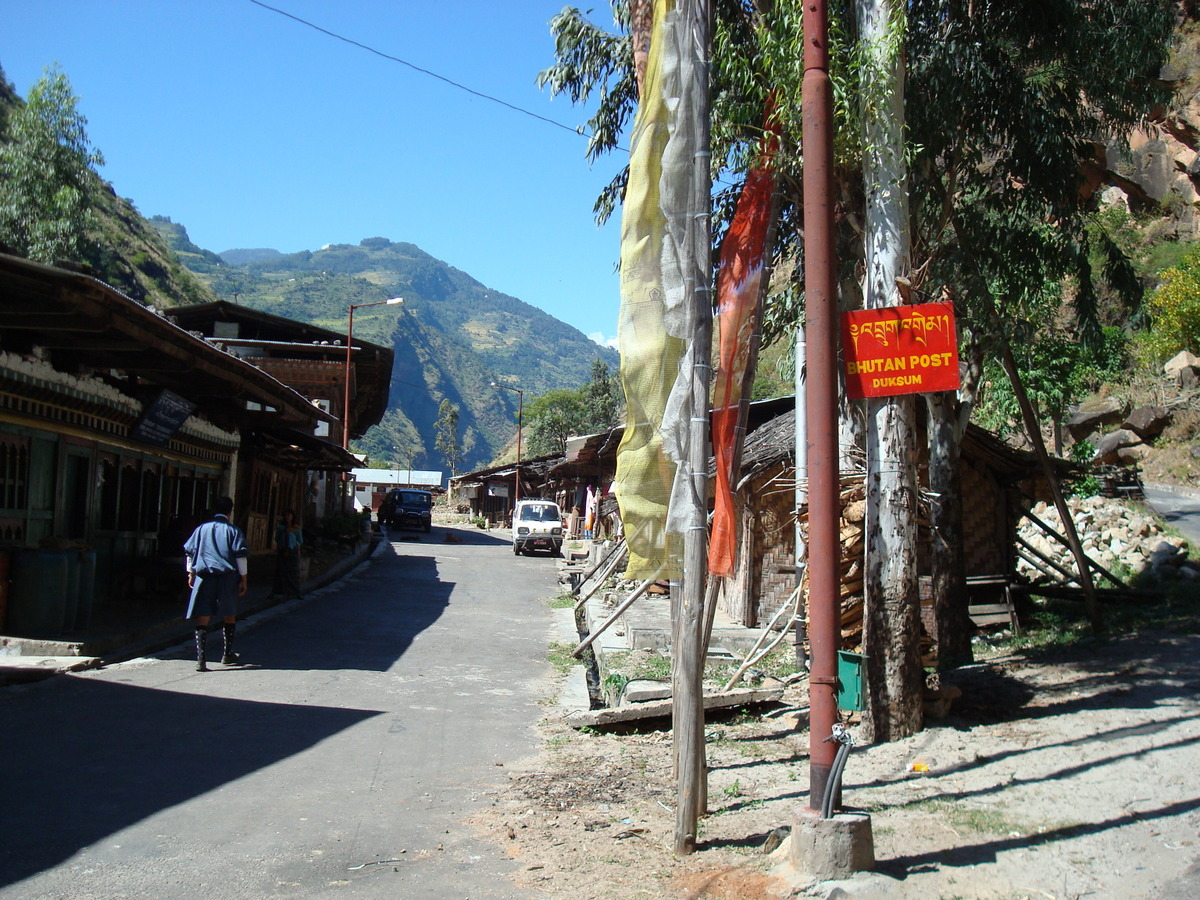
Main street of Duksum Trashiyangtse district, Bhutan

At the 2005 census, its population was 283. The post code of Duksum post office is 46002.
