= Kezang Dorji =

Bhutanese rapper, social worker (born 1989)

- Born: October 22, 1989 (age 36); Samdrup Jongkhar, Bhutan
- Genres: Rap; B-Pop
- Occupations: Rapper, songwriter, social worker
- Years active: 2011–present
- Label: M-Studio
- Website: www.kezangdorji.com

Kezang Dorji (born October 22, 1989) is a Bhutanese rapper, social worker, and a youth icon. He was named "The Rising Star of Bhutan" in 2016 by Kuensel. He is also the recipient of the prestigious South Asian Youth Award 2018. Kezang is the first Bhutanese artist to be featured on BBC News (2018) and CNN ( The Wonder List with Bill Weir on the episode "Bhutan: The Happiest Place on Earth", 2016).

== Early life ==
Kezang Dorji was born in a remote village called Wooling Village in the eastern Bhutanese district of Samdrup Jongkhar. Hoping for a better life his family moved to a small town in Samdrup Jongkhar called Dewathang. His parents were separated when he was six years old and he had a difficult childhood.

"My family had a very hard life. My parents separated when I was about six years old. My siblings and I were raised by our single mother with whatever she could earn from weaving. Conditions worsened that I even thought of quitting school at one point of time. Coming from a broken and a disadvantaged family, my childhood had been fraught with tough times."

Kezang found strength from his experiences. "I don't feel scared of things that scare others as I have been through worse," he says. Music was the only thing that gave him some solace.

== Education ==
Kezang studied in the then Dewathang Middle Secondary School in his hometown Dewathang till tenth grade from 1996 to 2006. He studied science in Baylling Higher Secondary School (now Baylling Central School) in Trashiyangtse. Kezang graduated with a Bachelor of Arts degree in English and Dzongkha from Sherubtse College in 2012.

== Career ==
=== Music ===
While in university, Kezang released an album titled Sherubtse Rockers Vol#1 Make A Difference (2011). One of the tracks, "Chegi Denley", was released on YouTube with a music video. After graduation, he released additional songs with M-Studio, a Bhutanese recording label.

He got his musical break in the Bhutanese movie "Baeyul-The Hidden Paradise" with the song "Gachibey" in 2014.

In 2017, he released a compilation album of sixteen of his songs released from 2011 to 2017, titled The Kuzuzangpo Album. Kezang dropped his second album 'Kuzuzangpo 2' on digital platforms in 2019 and launched the physical album on an 8GB USB drive in 2021.

Kezang was influenced primarily by Eminem and learned to rap by listening to Eminem. He also followed rappers like 50 Cent.

“Although, I did not fully understand the lyrics of the songs, I could relate to what the song said,” he said to Kuensel. “And knowing that rappers like Eminem and 50 Cent also came from separated families and that their lives were also filled with challenges before they became successful inspired me to keep moving in my life. Later on, my own life would inspire me to write my songs.”

== Awards & honours ==
=== 1. South Asian Youth Award 2018 ===
Kezang was awarded the South Asian Youth Award 2018 by the International Youth Committee. He received a gold medal at the South Asian Youth Summit in Sri Lanka in November 2018. The award was given to him in recognition of his efforts in social work in his country and using his music for a positive cause. More than 240 youths from 41 Asian countries were nominated for the prestigious award.

=== ii. National ===
==== 1. Grand Jury Award, 2007 (Children & Youth Festival 2007) ====
While in Baylling higher secondary school Kezang stood first in a national level poetry competition in the Children & Youth Festival 2007.

==== 2. Director's Medal in Social Service, 2012 (Sherubtse College) ====
On his graduation from Sherubtse College Kezang was awarded the prestigious "Director's Medal for Social Service" for his social works while in university.

In May 2017, Dorji represented Bhutan in a youth summit in Mongolia called the LEAD Alliance 2017 where he gave a talk on his musical journey titled "The Power of Music".

== Youth leadership ==
Kezang was elected the President of his college (FINA President) in 2011 and served till graduation in 2012. At the National Graduates Orientation Program 2012, he was elected as the Chief Councillor. Kezang also served as the elected Speaker of the first cohort of the Youth Initiative in 2014.

As an active youth leader Kezang was invited to represent Bhutan in the following international youth summits;

=== 1. Global Summit, 2018, Austria ===
Kezang represented Bhutan at the Global Summit of the Generation Democracy network of youths organised by the International Republican Institute, US in Vienna, Austria from May 25–27, 2018.

=== 2. Generation Democracy, 2017, Indonesia ===
In recognition of his dedication to social work and for making music with social messages Kezang was nominated by International Republican Institute, US to participate in the second annual Generation Democracy Asia Regional Academy, held in Jakarta, Indonesia from December 8–10, 2017.

=== 3. LEAD Alliance 2017 (Fellowship), Mongolia ===
Kezang was one of the five Bhutanese youth leaders to attend the Leaders Advancing Democracy Summit in Ulaanbataar, Mongolia in May 2017. He was a co-recipient of the LEAD Alliance grant with one of the other Bhutanese Fellows and through the grant a project called Sustainable Waste Management was initiated in Bhutan.

=== 4. World Thinkers & Poets' Peace Meet-2010, Kolkata, India ===
For his contribution to performing arts in university Kezang was sent to Rabindra Bharati University in 2010 where he was awarded a "Certificate of Excellence" at the "World Thinkers & Poets' Peace Meet 2010."

== Tours ==
=== The Kuzuzangpo Tours ===
In 2016, Kezang became the first Bhutanese solo artist to tour the country with The Kuzuzangpo Tour. Dorji toured nine districts and performed in twelve venues from September 17, 2016, to October 22, 2016. After the tour, Bhutan Broadcasting Service interviewed him on the objectives of his tour. The show was titled The Rise of a Rapper with Kezang Dorji.

In 2019, Kezang did his second tour, "The Kuzuzangpo Tour 2" in which he covered all the 20 districts of Bhutan. The tour had 25 shows and it was done in 36 days (April 25, 2019 to May 29, 2019).

== Discography ==
=== Albums ===
- Sherubtse Rockers Vol#1 Make A Difference (2011)
- The Kuzuzangpo Album (2017)
- Kuzuzangpo 2 (2019)
