= Bumdeling Valley =

Valley in Bhutan

Bumdeling Valley is one of the valleys located in Bumdeling Gewog, Trashiyangtse District, Bhutan. It is a part of the Bumdeling Wildlife Sanctuary that is a winter home to a rare species of Black-necked crane.
