= The Kuzuzangpo Tour =

2016 concert tour of Bhutan by Kezang Dorji

The Kuzuzangpo Tour was Bhutan's first concert tour by rapper Kezang Dorji. The tour began on September 17, 2016 at Paro and concluded on October 22, 2016 in Thimphu. With the Kuzuzangpo Tour, Kezang made history as the first ever Bhutanese artist to tour the country as a solo artist.

== Background ==
Kezang Dorji shared with Kuensel that he always dreamt of touring the country as a Bhutanese rapper. He had spent a long time working on it and in 2016 he decided to do the tour.

The rapper took the initiative to see if concert tours in Bhutan would work. He mentioned in a post-tour interview that he wanted his tour to be a pilot test for other accomplished singers that have contributed a lot to the music industry in Bhutan. If his tour succeeded or failed, it will be a lesson for all the other artists.

The tour was also a step towards achieving a stronger and more independent Bhutanese music industry.

While on tour Kezang also donated storybooks to schools and children.

The tour was hosted in 12 venues in nine districts of Bhutan.

== Shows ==
Date	City	Country	Venue
September 17, 2016	Paro	Bhutan	Utpal HSS
September 17, 2016	Paro	Bhutan	Yoezerling HSS
September 24, 2016	Punakha	Bhutan	Ugyen Academy FC
September 25, 2016	Lobesa, Punakha	Bhutan	College of Natural Resources
September 27, 2016	Phuntsholing	Bhutan	College of Science and Technology
September 29, 2016	Samtse	Bhutan	Samtse College of Education
October 1, 2016	Gelephu	Bhutan	Kuendrup HSS
October 4, 2016	Dewathang	Bhutan	Dungsam Academy
October 5, 2016	Dewathang	Bhutan	Dewathang, JNEC
October 7, 2016	Nganglam	Bhutan	DCCL
October 9, 2016	Trashigang	Bhutan	Kanglung, Sherubtse
October 15, 2016	Chukha	Bhutan	Gaedu College of Business Studies
October 22, 2016	Thimphu	Bhutan	Big Bang
