= Khamdang, Bhutan =

Khamdang ཁམས་དྭངས
- Location in Bhutan
- Coordinates: 27°29′N 91°34′E
- Country: Bhutan
- District: Trashi Yangtse District
- Village block: Khamdang Gewog
- Time zone: UTC+6 (BTT)
- Postal code: 46002
- Area code: 08

Khamdang is a town in Trashigang District in eastern Bhutan.
