= BHSS =

BHSS could refer to

- Bloomington High School South
- Baylling Higher Secondary School
- Balestier Hill Secondary School
- Bill Hogarth Secondary School
- Baptist Church of Mizoram#Baptist Higher Secondary School (BHSS)
