= Baylling Higher Secondary School =

- Bird eye view of Baylling HSS

Baylling Higher Secondary School (BHSS) was established in 2004 in Bhutan. BHSS was included when the government had declared 19 autonomous schools in the January month of 2014.

== Location ==
BHSS is located at Trashiyangtse Gewog under Trashi Yangtse District and the school is 4 km above the Trashiyangtse town. The school’s infrastructures are red-roofed and erected on the gentle slope above the Trashi Yangtse Dzong.

== Historical background ==
During the 8th century, Guru Rinpoche visited Trashiyangtse and concealed treasures to be discovered by Treasure Finders. Therefore, this place came to be known as “Baylling –meaning Hidden Land”. And the school derives its name from the spiritual blessings by Guru Rinpoche himself. The concept to have the school of current stature was of the Health and Education Minister, Lyonpo Sangay Ngedup. The construction work was assigned to Druk Construction Company and work actually began on 16 November 2000. The project tendered cost of Nu. 54,814,900.40/- and it is to be completed within the project duration of 30 months. The school was officially taken over by the Trashi Yangtse Dzongkhag Administration on 8 March 2005 after a complete verification of the infrastructures by a team led by Dasho Dzongdag Dorji Norbu. The first principal was Mr. Phuntsho Wangdi who had served from 2004 to 2008. He was succeeded by Mr. Yonten Jamtsho, who led the school from 2009 to 2019. Currently, the school is functioning under the stewardship of Mr. Norbu. The school underwent much transformation in terms of human staffing and infrastructure after it was converted to central school in 2016. The school also carried out the large task of erecting a huge statue of Vajrapani (Chana Dorji) in the year 2017 to bring peace and happiness to the school. In 2018, the district administration approved another six-unit classroom building to meet the ever increasing admission pressure from the different feeder schools. In 2020, the district approved 160 bedded hostel for boys and girls and one 6 unit classroom.
