= Jamkhar Gewog =

Jamkhar Gewog འཇམ་མཁར་
- Gewog
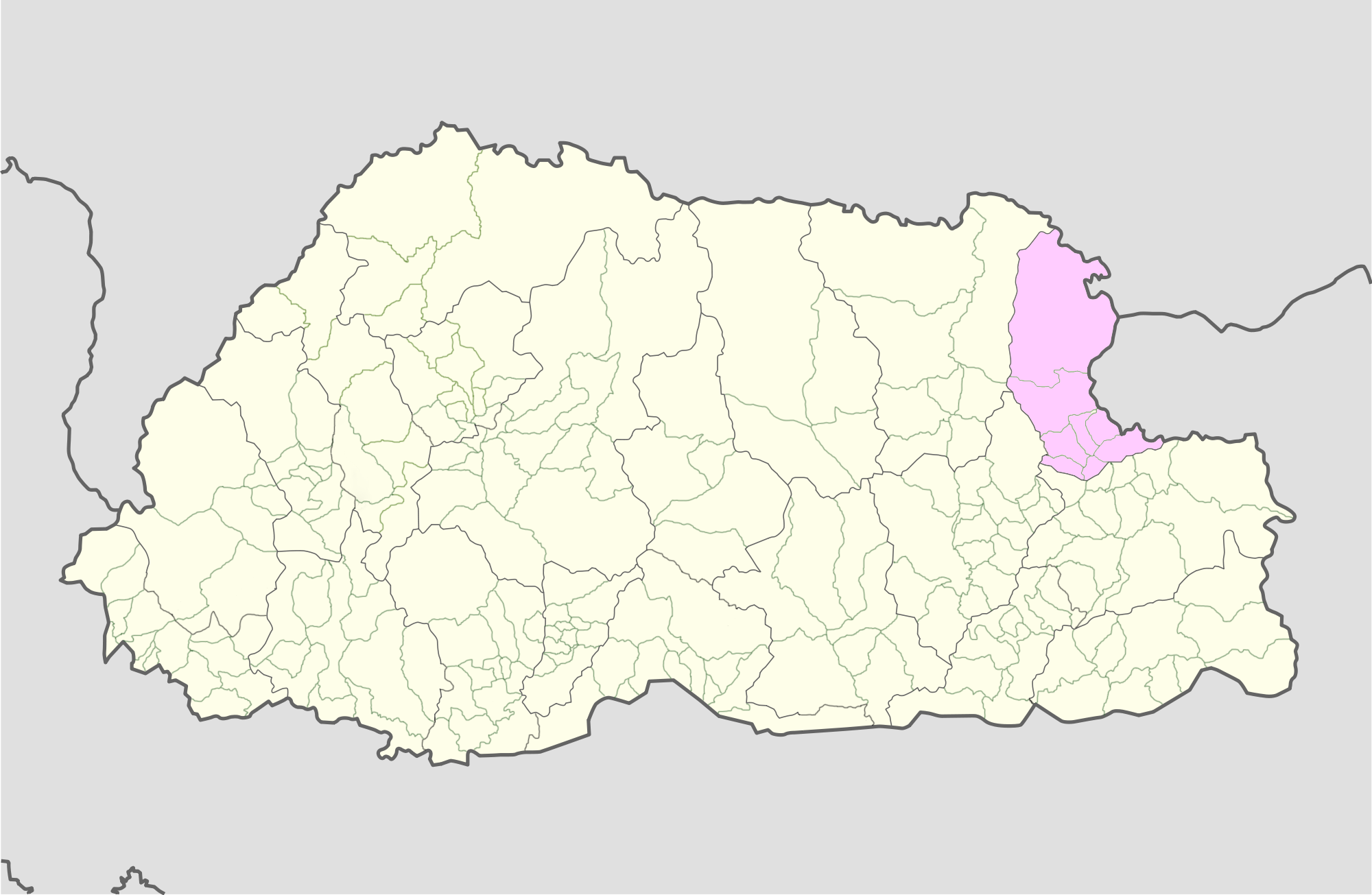
- Country: Bhutan
- District: Trashiyangtse District
- Time zone: UTC+6 (BTT)

Jamkhar Gewog (Dzongkha: འཇམ་མཁར་) is a gewog (village block) of Trashiyangtse District, Bhutan.
