= List of districts of Bhutan by Human Development Index =

This is a list of districts (dzongkhag) of Bhutan by Human Development Index as of 2023.

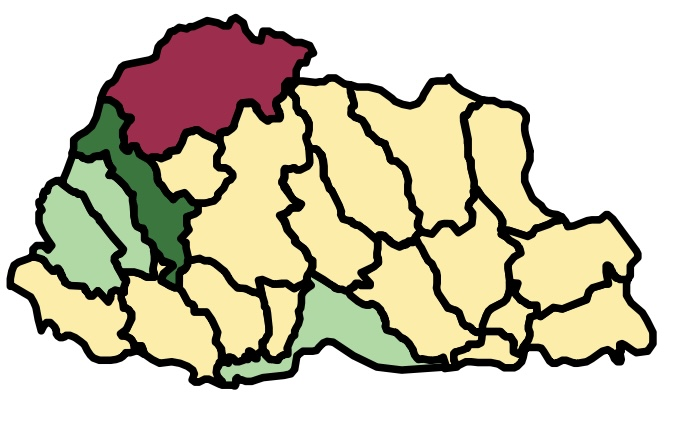
Districts of Bhutan by Human Development Index. Dark green-very high, green-high, yellow-medium, red-low

Rank	District	HDI (2023)
Very high human development
1	Thimphu	0.871
High human development
2	Paro	0.767
3	Haa	0.742
4	Chukha	0.737
5	Sarpang	0.729
6	Bumthang	0.704
Medium human development
–	Bhutan	0.698
7	Punakha	0.697
8	Tsirang	0.667
9	Samtse	0.659
10	Trongsa	0.655
11	Samdrup Jongkhar	0.651
12	Dagana	0.642
13	Pemagatshel	0.640
14	Wangdue Phodrang	0.639
15	Mongar	0.638
16	Zhemgang	0.636
17	Lhuntse	0.632
18	Trashiyangtse	0.621
19	Trashigang	0.610
20	Gasa	0.576
