= Ramjar Gewog =

Ramjar Gewog རམ་སྦྱར་
- Gewog
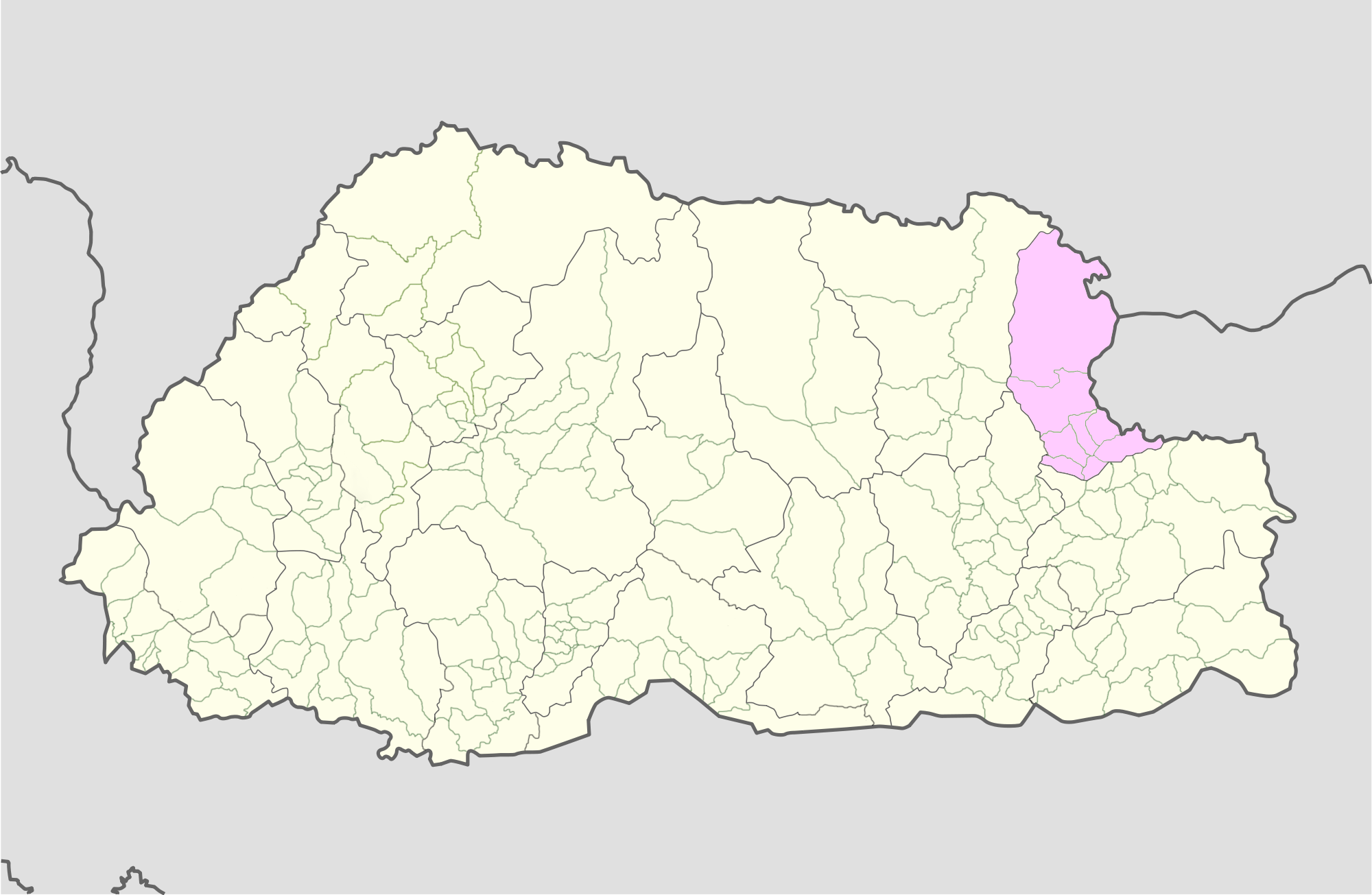
- Country: Bhutan
- District: Trashiyangtse District
- Time zone: UTC+6 (BTT)

Ramjar Gewog (Dzongkha: རམ་སྦྱར་) is a gewog (village block) of Trashiyangtse District, Bhutan.
