= Toetsho Gewog =

Toetsho Gewog སྟོད་མཚོ་
- Gewog
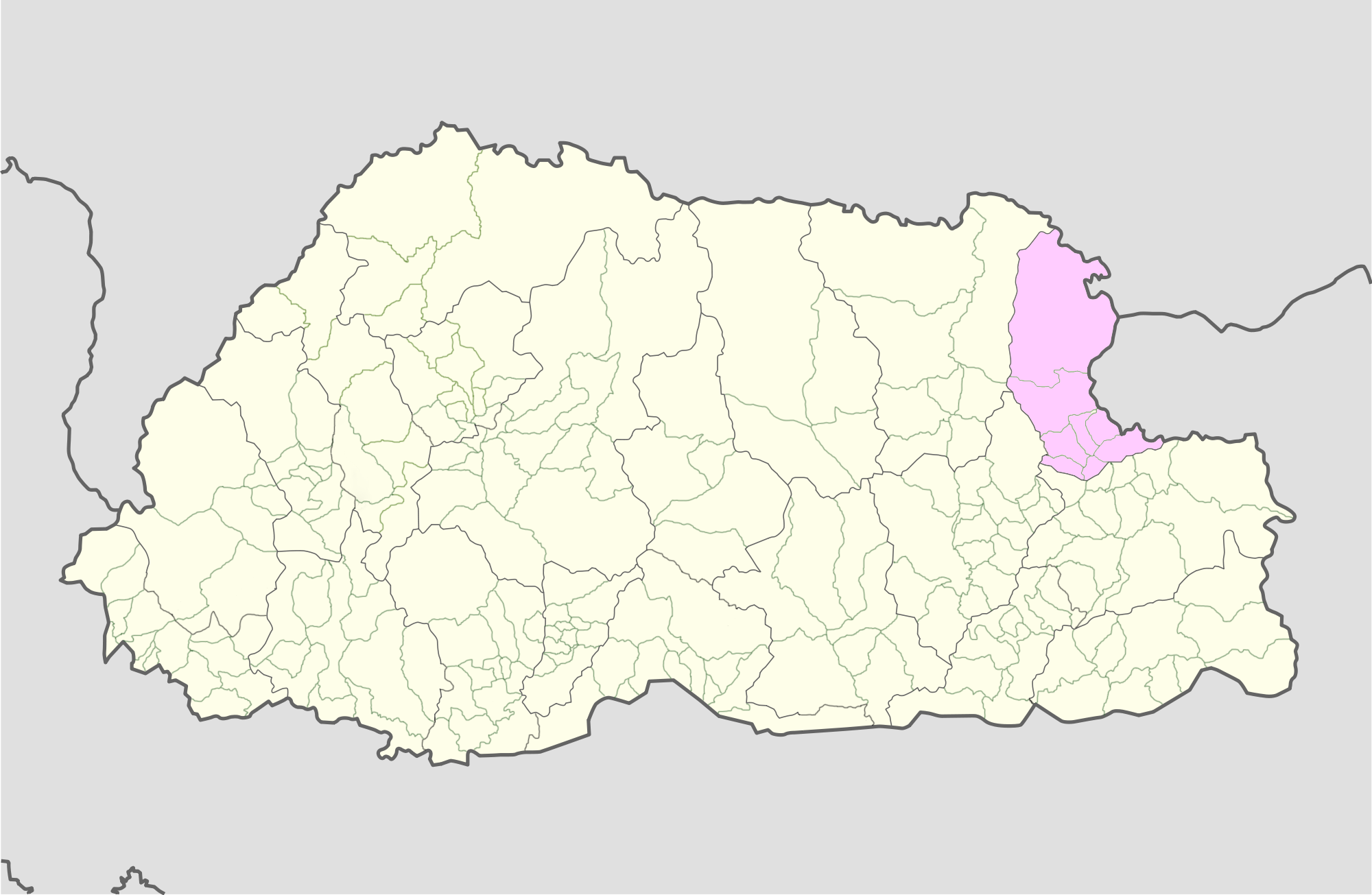
- Country: Bhutan
- District: Trashiyangtse District
- Time zone: UTC+6 (BTT)

Toetsho Gewog (Dzongkha: སྟོད་མཚོ་) is a gewog (village block) of Trashiyangtse District, Bhutan. Toetsho gewog is named after toetsho lake which has cultural and spiritual significance in a community, as it is thought that protective deities live in the lake. Toetsho gewog has a total population are 3787 of this 1885 is female and 1902 is male. Also, there are not many households, only 547 and there are 126 empty houses.

Toetsho gewog is very rich in culture, which has 16 temples and many different types of festivals are conducted yearly to conserve Bhutanese tradition. For example, mask dances and some religious ceremonies are believed to help in spiritual ways.

That gewog is one of the villages, surrounded by varieties of stupas and many sacred places in four conditional directions. It is covered with a lot of forest.
