= The Kuzuzangpo Album =

Compilation album by Kezang Dorji
- Released: 2017
- Genre: Rap

The Kuzuzangpo Album a compilation album by Bhutanese rapper Kezang Dorji.

The album has sixteen rap songs which are sung in English, Dzongkha (Bhutan's National Language) and Tshangla/Sharchokpa (Eastern Bhutan Dialect). The album was released in October 2017.

The album is also the first Bhutanese album to be released in a USB Flash Drive (2GB).
