= Yalang Gewog =

Yalang Gewog ཡ་ལང་
- Gewog
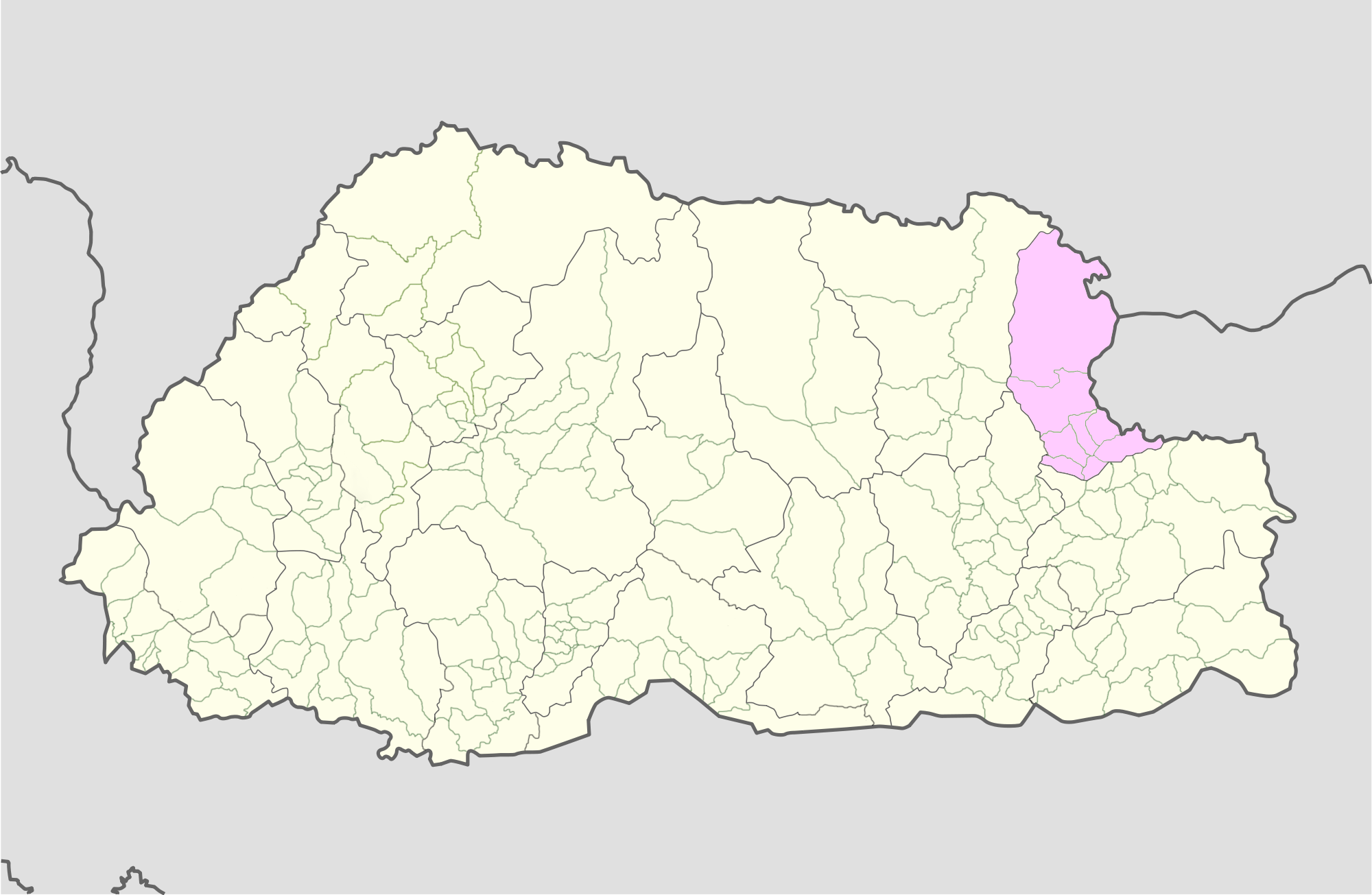
- Country: Bhutan
- District: Trashiyangtse District
- Time zone: UTC+6 (BTT)

Yalang Gewog (Dzongkha: ཡ་ལང་) is a gewog (village block) of Trashiyangtse District, Bhutan.
