= Tomzhangsa Gewog =

Tomzhangsa Gewog སྟོང་མི་གཞང་ས་
- Gewog
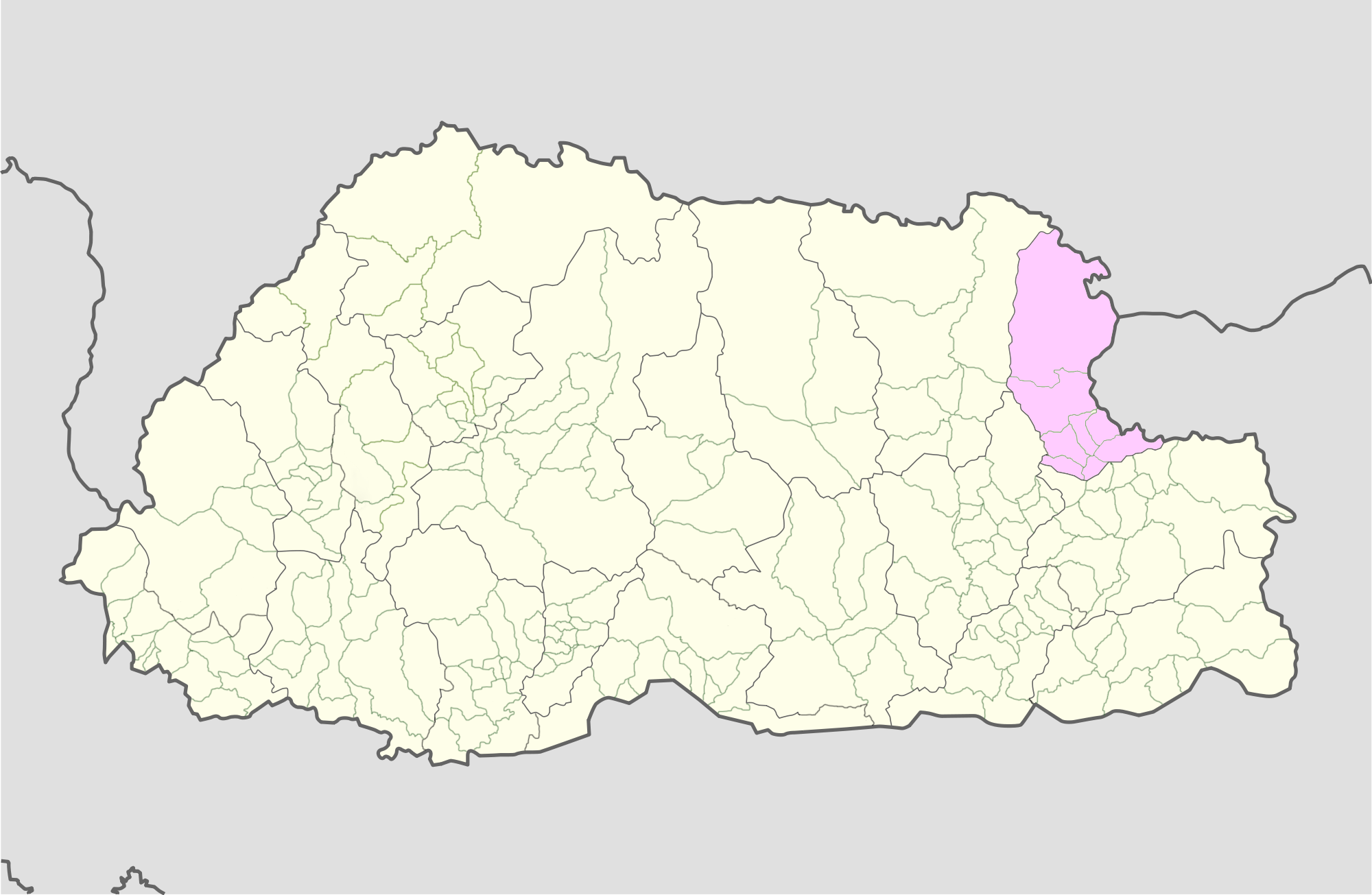
- Country: Bhutan
- District: Trashiyangtse District
- Time zone: UTC+6 (BTT)

Tomzhangsa Gewog (Dzongkha: སྟོང་མི་གཞང་ས་) is a gewog (village block) of Trashiyangtse District, Bhutan. It was formerly known as Tomzhangtshen.
