= Khamdang Gewog =

Khamdang Gewog, Bhutan ཁམས་དྭངས་
- Linear; scattered; clustered
- Location in Bhutan
- Coordinates: 27°29′N 91°34′E
- Country: Bhutan
- District: Trashi Yangtse District

Government
  - Type: Bhutanese democracy
  - King: Jigme Khesar Namgyal Wangchuk
  - Dzongdag: Dasho Thuji Tshering
  - Gup: Norbu
  - Tshogpa: Rinchen Wangdi

Area
  - Urban: 17 sq mi (45 km^{2})

Population (2010)
  - Linear; scattered; clustered: 4,000
  - Density: 210/sq mi (82/km^{2})
- Time zone: UTC+6 (BTT)
- Postal code: 46002
- Area code: 04
- Website: http://www.trashiyangtse.gov.bt/gewogDetail.php?id=6

Khamdang Gewog (Dzongkha: ཁམས་དྭངས་) is a gewog (village block) of Trashiyangtse District, Bhutan.

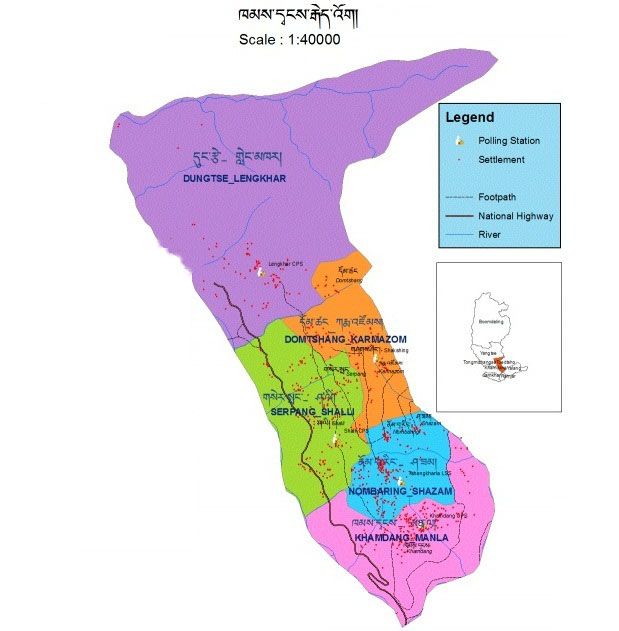
Khamdang copy

== Overview ==
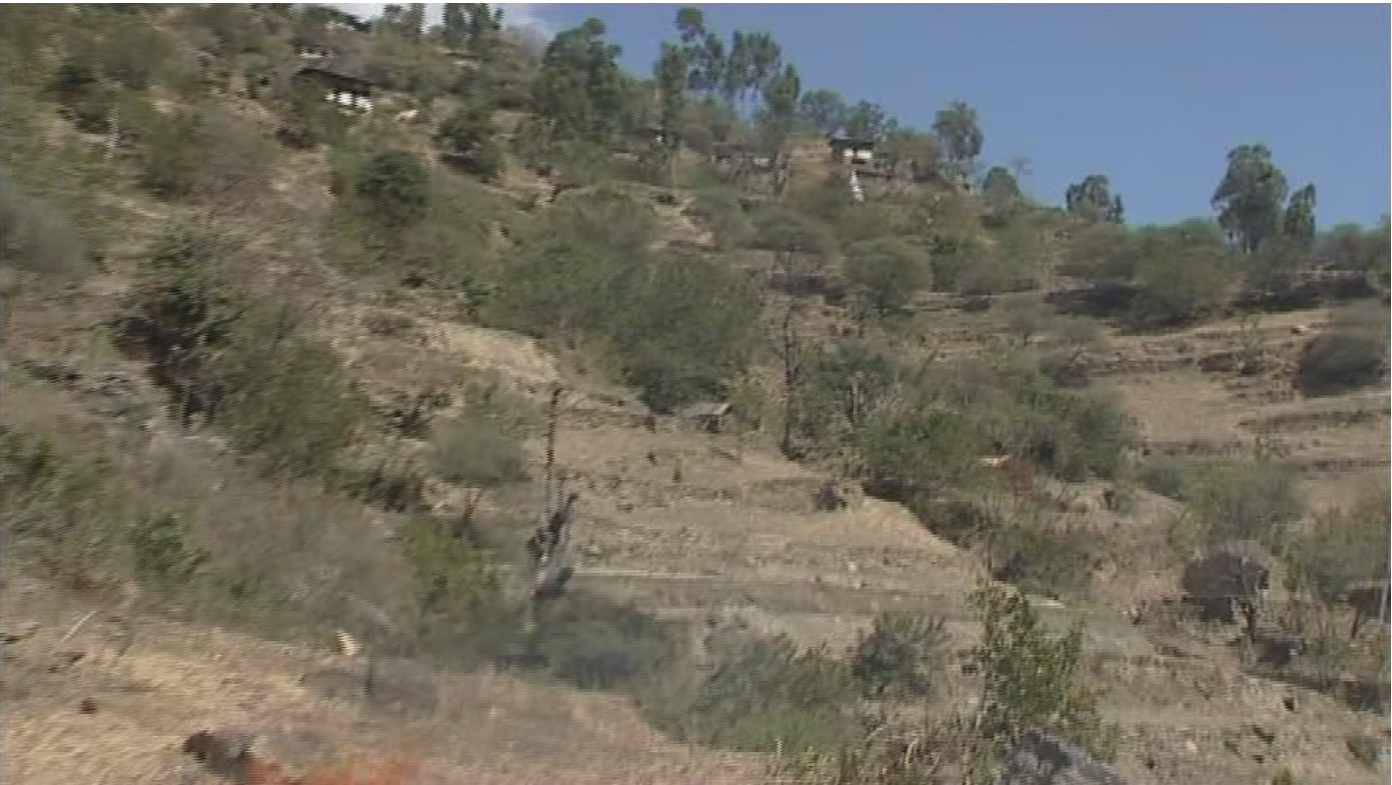
Khamdang

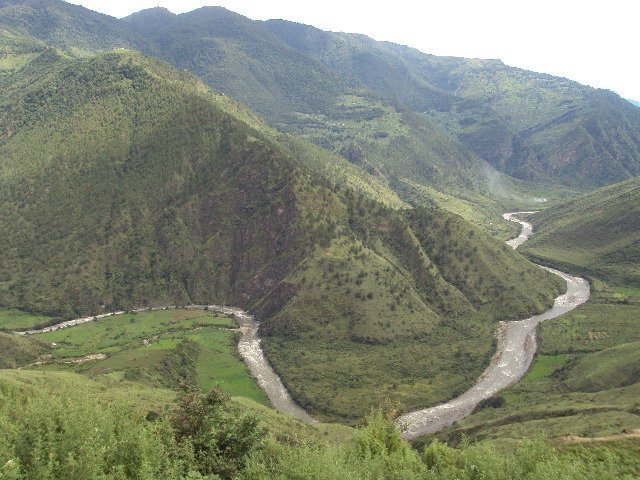
View from Khamdang Village

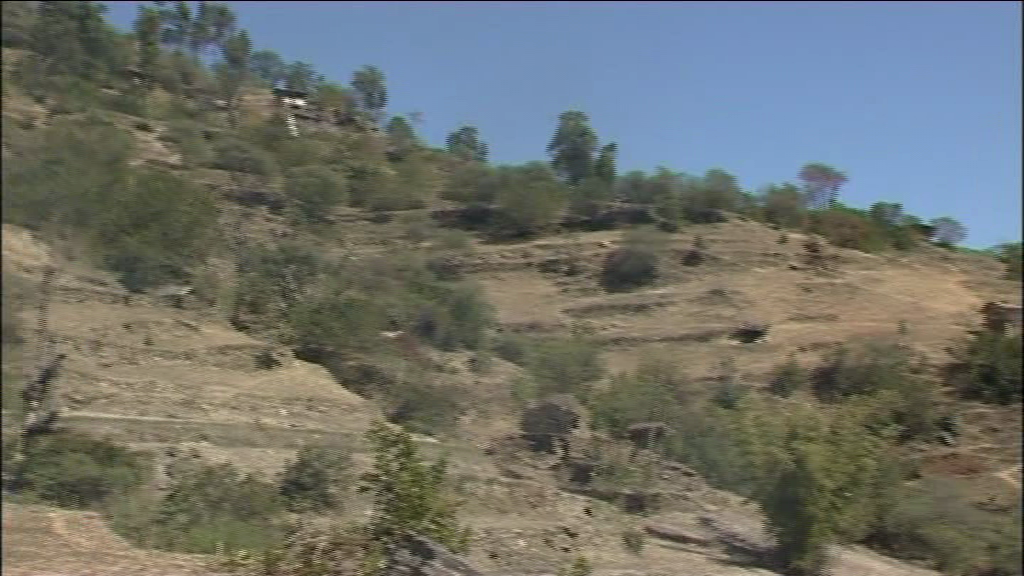
View of real Khamdang Village under Khamdang gewog; Trashi Yangtse; Bhutan

Khamdang Gewog consists of 18 villages with 617 households, covering an area of 44.5 square km with a population of 4,320. The gewog is very dry mainly due to less forest coverage. Since it is in a dry zone, the most dominant land use categories in the gewog are dry land and Pangshing followed by the wetland and some Tseri cultivation. The major crops grown are maize, wheat, buckwheat and potato. While rice are grown on the lower areas and terraced fields developed in the 1970s.

== History ==
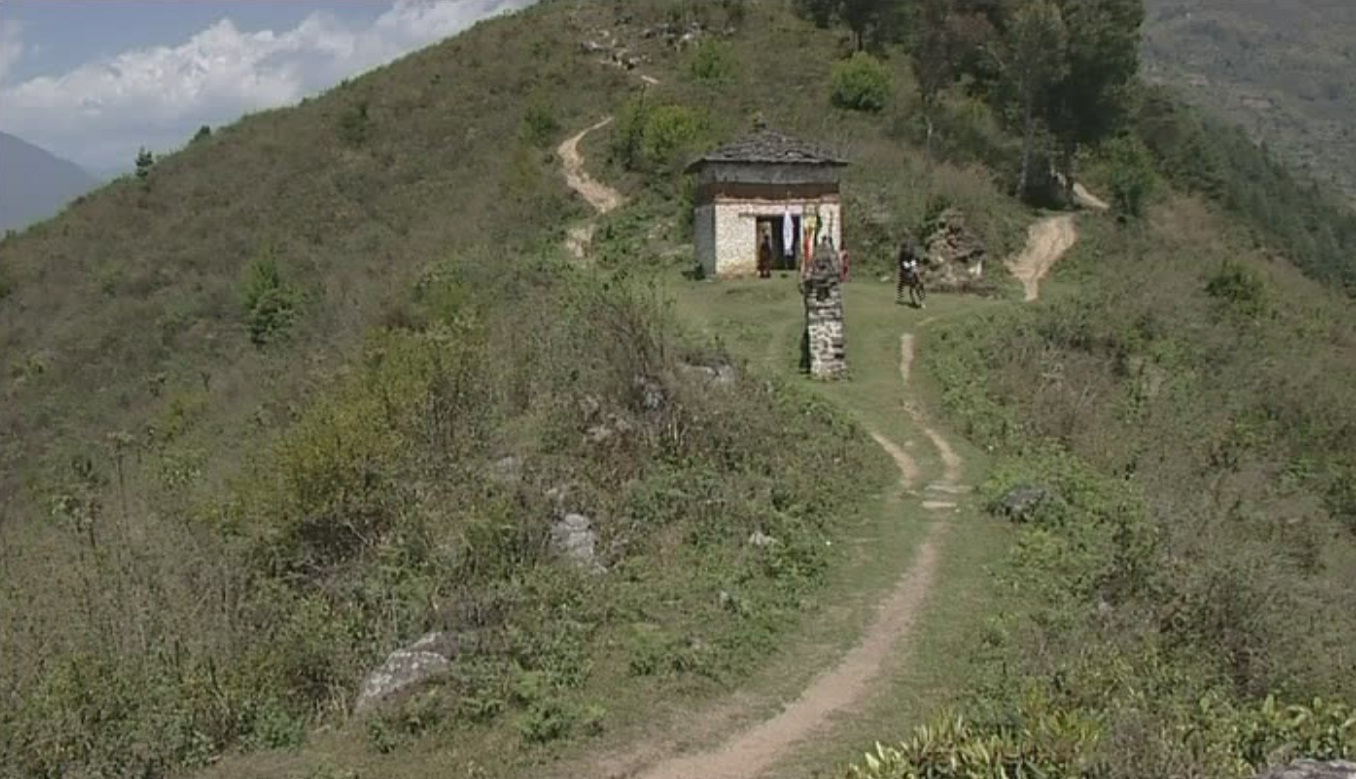
Near the Ruins of fortress of Lhasey Tshangma; Khamdang; Trashi Yangtse; Bhutan

The ruins with Khamdang villages depicts and reveals the fact about early inhabitants there. Near Shali in a small village called Denglum there is remains of ruins of Denglum Tshering Samdrup; a well known man during eighth century AD. The ruins of Khamdang Lekey Samdrup in main village of Khamdang; and the ruins of Wombu Karma samdrup used to be early inhabitants of Khamdang village. The notable history also lies in the old ruined fortress of Lhasey Tshangma at Tsenkharla Right near the present day Tsenkharla Middle Secondary School, school. Historically until the arrival of great Tibetan Buddhist masters; people inhabiting the area were practicing Bon faith like many parts of Bhutan did.

== Demographics and ethnicity ==
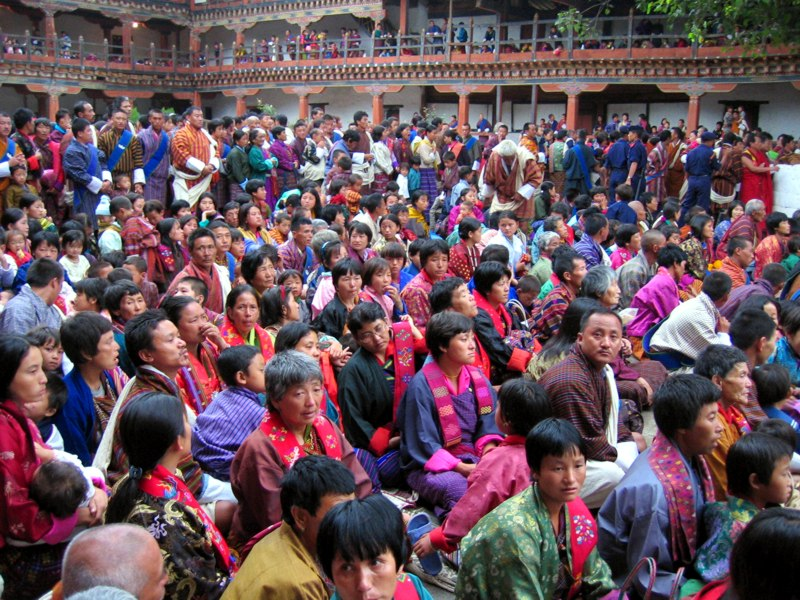
Bhutanese people.

The population of the gewog counts to 4320 with a density of 82 per km^{2}. The constituent people residing in Khamdang has varied originality. The Sharchokp speaking people in the middle and main Khamdang has their origins rooted to nearby Indian state of Arunachal Pradesh. The Kurtoep speaking people, constituting North-West Khamdang probably have been migrated during feudal era from Mongar/Zhongar. There constitute also a group of people speaking local dialects called Zalakha who were originally migrated from the Tawang, a small town in Indian state of Arunachal Pradesh.

== Climate ==
While the Gewog confronts to all 4 seasonal change; the Northern part can be extremely cold during winter and have favorable climate during summer seasons. The Southern part can have a hot a humid climate during summer as in Manla; with temperature as high as 30 degrees Celsius with winter temperature ranging from 15 to 20 degrees Celsius. The middle Khamdang experiences warmer summer and cooler winter. This variation in climatic conditions led people to cultivate in Southern part during winter; and Northern part during summer.

The main cash crops cultivated by the farmer are maize, chilies, potatoes, peanuts and other fruits like apple, walnut and pears. Rice cultivation is seen mainly at subsistence level. The still exists barter system within the farmer groups; exchanging rice and maize from lower altitude people to chilies from higher altitude people.

== Developments ==
The Gewog has four community primary schools and one Middle Secondary School, Tsenkharla Middle Secondary School. Almost all the households have easy access to the schooling facilities. However, few households at Shakshing and Manla villages are within walking distance of one hour in one way due to typical nature of the location of the land. Students coming from these villages attend school as boarders at Tsenkharla Middle Secondary School.

It is the only gewog in the Dzongkhag connected by 9.1 km metalled feeder road. Further, the Dzongkhag road also passes through the geog. One BHU, and four ORC render basic health services in the gewog. Other development facilities in the gewog consist of RNR center and one forest beat office. Road access to the geog facilitates the marketing of farm produces at Doksum, Chorten Cora and Tashigang. There is not much possibility for increasing the cereals cultivation but the potential to grow citrus and other sub- tropical fruits and vegetables for cash income generation exists. About 80% of the Gewog is electrified.

=== Civic administration ===
The civic administration of Khamdang Gewog is the responsibility of the Khamdang Gup; who is directly accountable to the Dzongkhag Administration in Trashiyangtse. All the developmental plans comes from people to the Gup and then is forwarded to Dzongkhag Administration.

== Religion and culture ==
Although Mahayana Buddhism is the state religion, almost all the people residing in the gewog are following Nyingma tradition of Tibetan Buddhism. Of various festivals performed in the gewog most notable is the annual event of Shakshing Tshechu. Khamdang Gewog has many Buddhist Religious Sites (Nye) with notable ones being Ombha Nye, Gungja Nye, Shakshing Goenpa, Darchen Goenpa and Nangkhar Goenpa For well to do people, it is common to host a religious offerings and feasts. It is often seen the every household in such times will go to the hosts place with locally brewed wine and rice.

=== Sacred sites ===
Three hours from the Yalang Suspension Bridge is a small temple built into an overhanging rock, called Gongza Ney. It holds a petrified treasure chest, shoe of Guru Rinpoche, devils egg and other relics. A 78-year-old man, Dawa, from Khamdang, has devoted his life to take care of the Gongza Ney. The lhakhang was constructed in 1993. Barefoot, Tshampa Dawa, a lay monk, continues to guide the visitors along the Drangmechhu, imparting the sacredness of the site to the people. He has been doing this and taking care of the sacred site for more than three decades.

==== Omba Ney ====
After a three-hour walk from Naangkhar Gompa, incorporating a steep descent of 330m and more than 125 m of climbing, is a scared place commonly known as Omba Ney or the Taktshang of eastern Bhutan. The letter Om can be seen engraved on the rock face within the holy pilgrimage site. It is one of the three unique holy places founded by Guru Rinpoche, the other being Aja and Hungrel, where the letters AH and HUM can be seen in different dzongkhags. It is believed that a short crawl through a narrow cave passage on the cliff above the Lhakhang will rid one of impurities, while one can scramble even higher up the cliff through a crack in the rock. According to the history of Omba Ney, Guru Rinpoche meditated for 2 months, subduing the demon namely Phurba Trashi. It was Toerten Guru Choewang (1212-1270), sungtrul of Jampelyang Gyalpo Thrisong Deutsen who liberated the site to people. Toerten Guru Choewang travelled from Kurtoe Nyalamdung to Trashiyangtse where Omba Ney was hidden. On arriving at the site he pointed out that Aa is in Mon Kha Sheri Dzong And Om is there also. Later Terton Pema Lingpa travelled from Bumthang to Tawang via Om Ba Ney to give teachings and spent several days at Om Ba Ney and further introduced many treasures and empoweried people with blessings and teachings. Terton Pema Lingpa’s granddaughter Ani Choeten Zangmo also spent some time at the ney.
