= Buddha Dordenma statue =

Buddha Statue in Thimphu, Bhutan

Buddha Dordenma
- Buddha Dordenma
- Interactive map of Buddha Dordenma
- Location: Kuenselphodrang, Thimphu, Bhutan
- Coordinates: 27.4435°N 89.6454°E
- Type: Statue
- Material: Bronze
- Height: 54 metres (177 ft)
- Beginning date: 2006
- Completion date: September 2015
- Dedicated to: Bring peace and prosperity to the world

Great Buddha Dordenma is a gigantic Shakyamuni Buddha statue in the mountains of Bhutan celebrating the 60th anniversary of fourth king Jigme Singye Wangchuck. The statue houses over one hundred thousand smaller Buddha statues, each of which, like the Great Buddha Dordenma itself, are made of bronze and gilded in gold. The Great Buddha Dordenma is sited amidst the ruins of Kuensel Phodrang, the palace of Sherab Wangchuk, the thirteenth Druk Desi, overlooking the southern approach to Thimphu, the capital of Bhutan. Construction began in 2006 and was planned to finish in October 2010, however construction did not conclude until 25 September 2015. The completed work is one of the largest Buddha stupas in the world, at 177 feet (54 m) and contains 100,000 8-inch-tall and 25,000 12-inch-tall gilded bronze Buddhas.

The statue was constructed at a cost of US$47 million by Aerosun Corporation of Nanjing, China, which was sponsored by Rinchen Peter Teo a Singaporean businessman and Danny Wong, a Hong Kong based Malaysian businessman. Australian architects Buro and Structural Engineers Arup HK assisted with the project. The total cost of the entire project is well over US$100 million. The interior will accommodate respectively. Names of sponsors are displayed in the meditation hall which forms the throne of the Great Buddha Dordenma. Apart from commemorating the centennial of the Bhutanese monarchy, it fulfills two prophecies. In the twentieth century, the yogi Sonam Zangpo prophesied that a large statue of either Padmasambhava, Buddha or of a phurba would be built in the region to bestow blessings, peace and happiness on the whole world. Additionally, the statue is mentioned in the ancient terma of Guru Rinpoche, a.k.a. Padmasambhava, himself, said to date from approximately the eighth century, and recovered some 672 years ago by terton Pema Lingpa.

Under the eyes of the Buddha statue, the Kuensel Phodrang nature park formally opened in 2011. The park conserves 943.4 acres of forest area that surrounds the Buddha Dordenma statue and houses two public outdoor gymnasiums which opened in 2015.

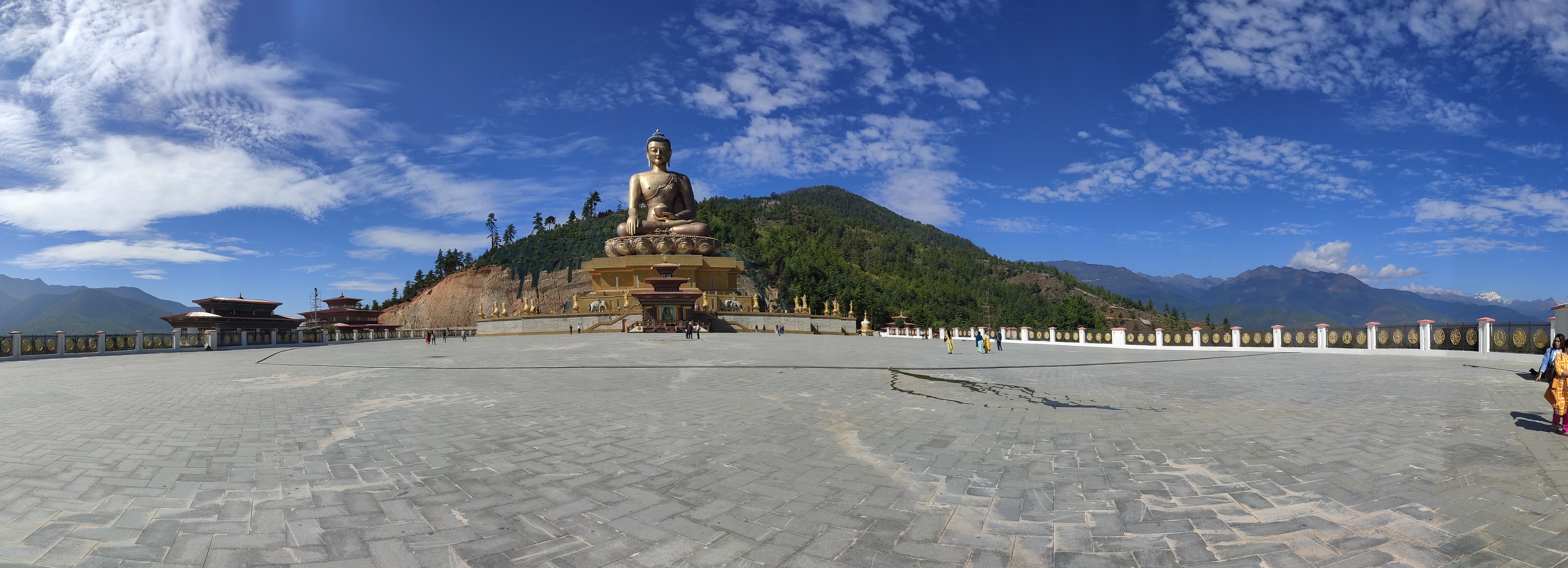
Panoramic View of Buddha Dordenma

== See also ==
- Laykyun Sekkya
- Great Buddha of Thailand
- The Big Buddha (Hong Kong)
- Great Buddha
