= Chendebji Chorten =

Stupa in Trongsa, Bhutan

Coordinates: 27°28′28″N 90°20′57″E

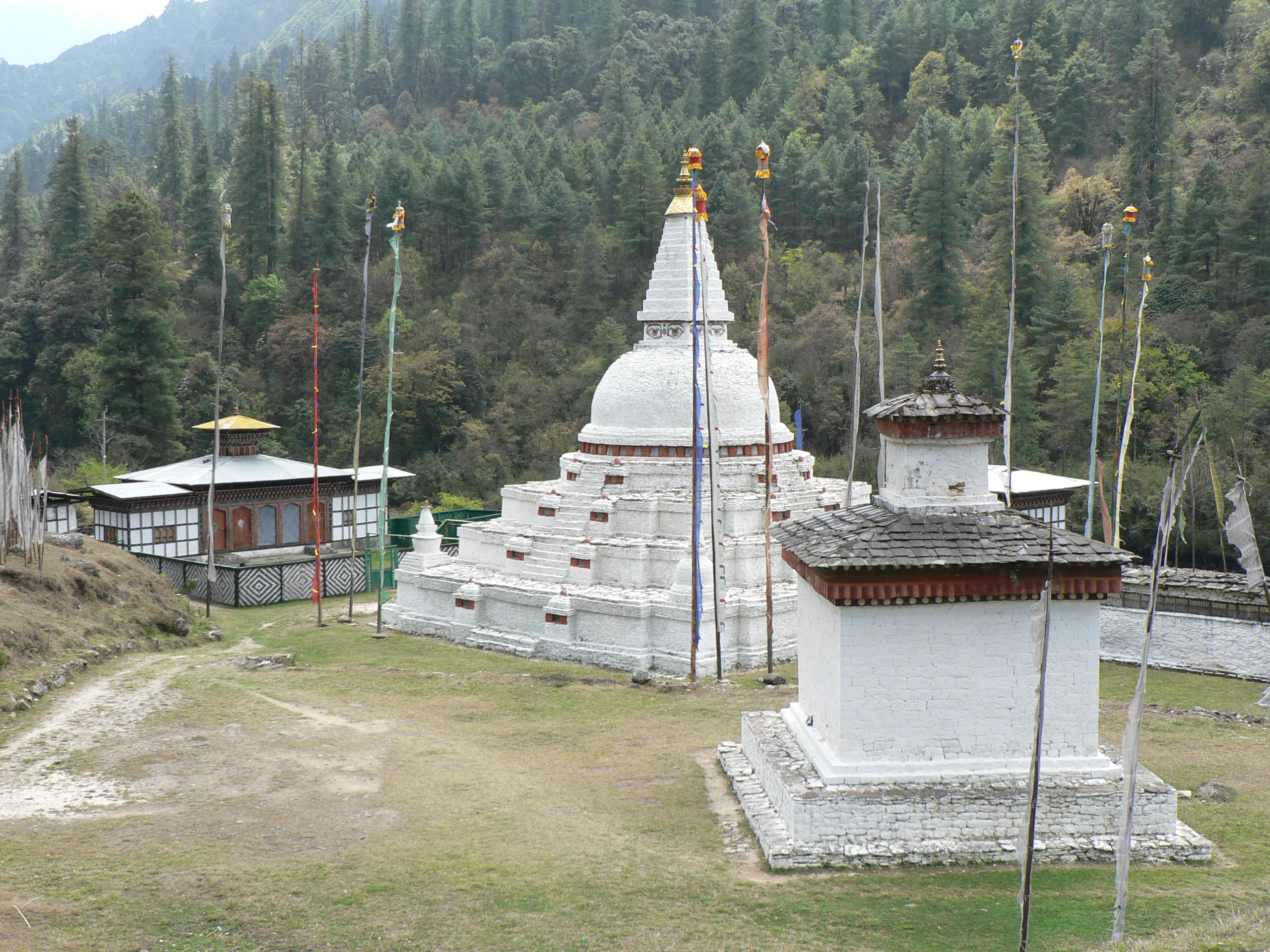
Chendebji Chorten

Chendebji Chorten is a stupa in Bhutan, located 41 kilometres (25 mi) west of Trongsa at 2,430 metres (7,970 ft) in elevation.

According to legend, Chendebji Chöten covers the body of an "evil spirit".

Chendebji Chorten is constructed in the style of Nepalese stupas such as Boudhanath. It was built at some point in the 18th century, and is located along the Chorten Lam, a path connecting various chortens in Bhutan. A prayer wall or mani stone is located in the complex.

It was constructed by Lam Oensey Tshering Wangchuk, reportedly to repel the demon Ngala.

A festival is held there annually from the 21st to the 25th day of the 9th lunar month of the Bhutanese calendar.

== See also ==
- Chorten Kora, another Nepalese-style chorten in Bhutan

== Sources ==
- Kinga, Sonam (2004). "A Brief History of Chendebji Village and Lhabon Celebration" (PDF). Wayo, Wayo—Voices From the Past. Thimphu: Centre for Bhutan Studies. ISBN 99936-14-20-3. OCLC 61674233.
