= Dewathang Gewog =

Dewathang Gewog དབེ་བ་ཐང་
- Gewog
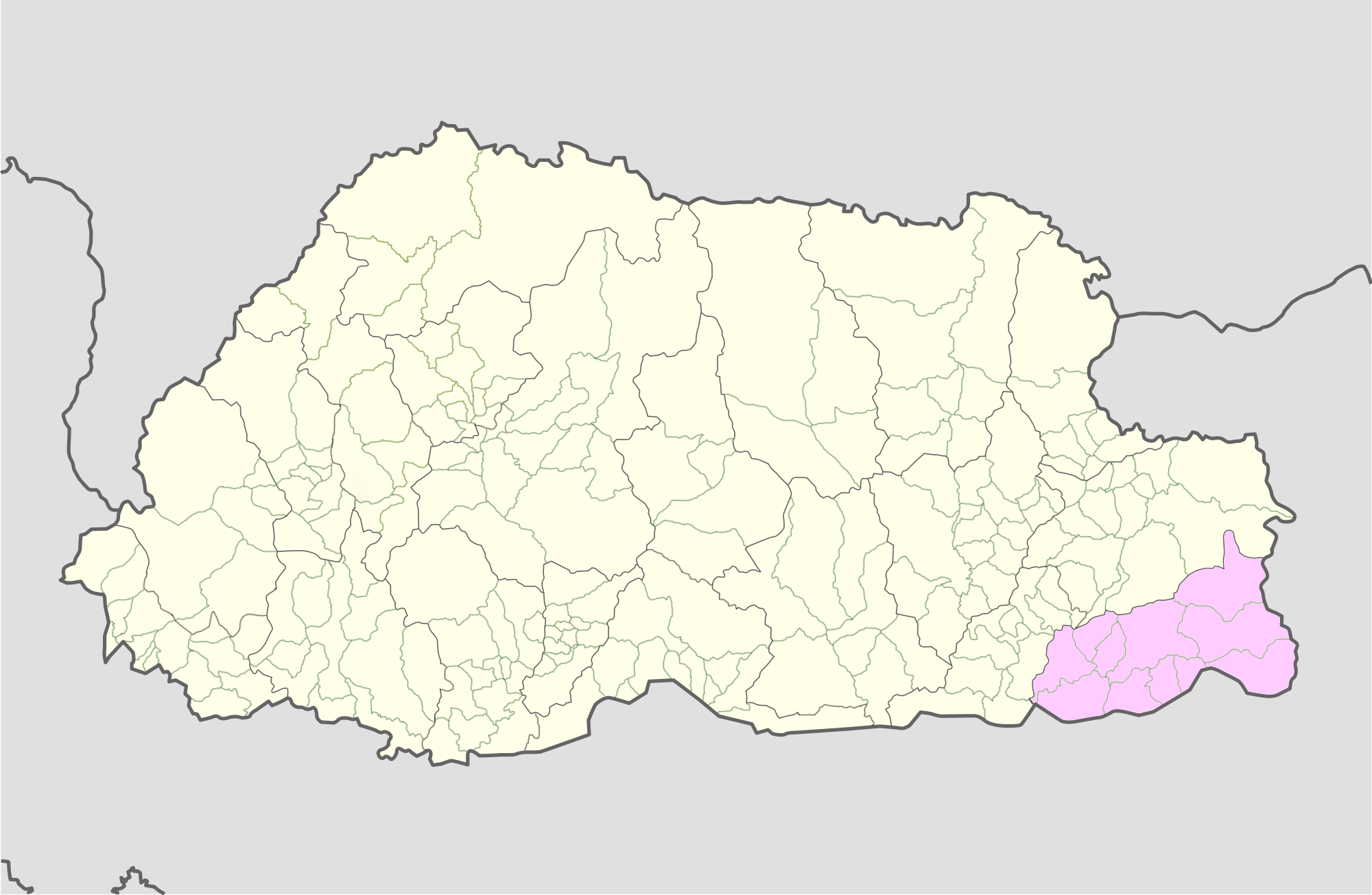
- Interactive map of Dewathang Gewog
- Coordinates: 26.8503°N 91.5147°E
- Country: Bhutan
- District: Samdrup Jongkhar District
- Time zone: UTC+6 (BTT)

Dewathang Gewog (Dzongkha: དབེ་བ་ཐང་) is a gewog (village block) of Samdrup Jongkhar District, Bhutan. Dewathang means "flat area of happiness". Dewathang is significant due to historical events associated with the area during British rule in India in the late 19th and early 20th centuries. The military cantonment was strategically important for theBhutanese army to conduct operation flush out (of Indian Militant Groups such as ULFA, KLO, and Bodo) in December 2003.
