= Trashiyangtse =

Trashi Yangtse Tashi Yangtse
- Location in Bhutan
- Coordinates: 27°35′N 91°28′E
- Country: Bhutan
- District: Trashiyangtse District
- Gewog: Yangtse Gewog

Population (2005)
  - Total: 2,735
- Time zone: UTC+6 (BTT)
- Website: Official website

Trashi Yangtse, is a town in Trashiyangtse District in the eastern part of Bhutan. The nearest airport is Yongphulla Airport 130 km away.

Its population in 2005 was 2735 and as of 2022. Located in close proximity to Chorten Kora stupa which lies to the west, a dzong was inaugurated in Trashiyangste in 1997. It contains a major art school, The School of 13 Traditional Arts, also known as Rigney School, which is a sister school of the Zorig Chosum School of Traditional Arts in Thimphu, and teaches six forms of art; painting, pottery, wood sculpture, wood-turning, lacquer-work and embroidery.

== Sacred sites ==
Chorten Kora, an important landmark located only 3 minutes from the main town. The chorten was constructed in the 17th century by Lama Ngawang Lodey to pacify a demon that terrorized the region. Legends say that a young Dakpa girl from Arunachal Pradesh, India believed to be a Dakini was buried alive in the stupa for the goodness of the mankind.

== See also ==
- Bhutan–India relations
- Bhutan–India border
- Bhutan–China border
- Line of Actual Control
