= Dechen Phodrang Monastery =

Buddhist monastery in Thimphu, Bhutan

- Tibetan transcription(s); Tibetan:

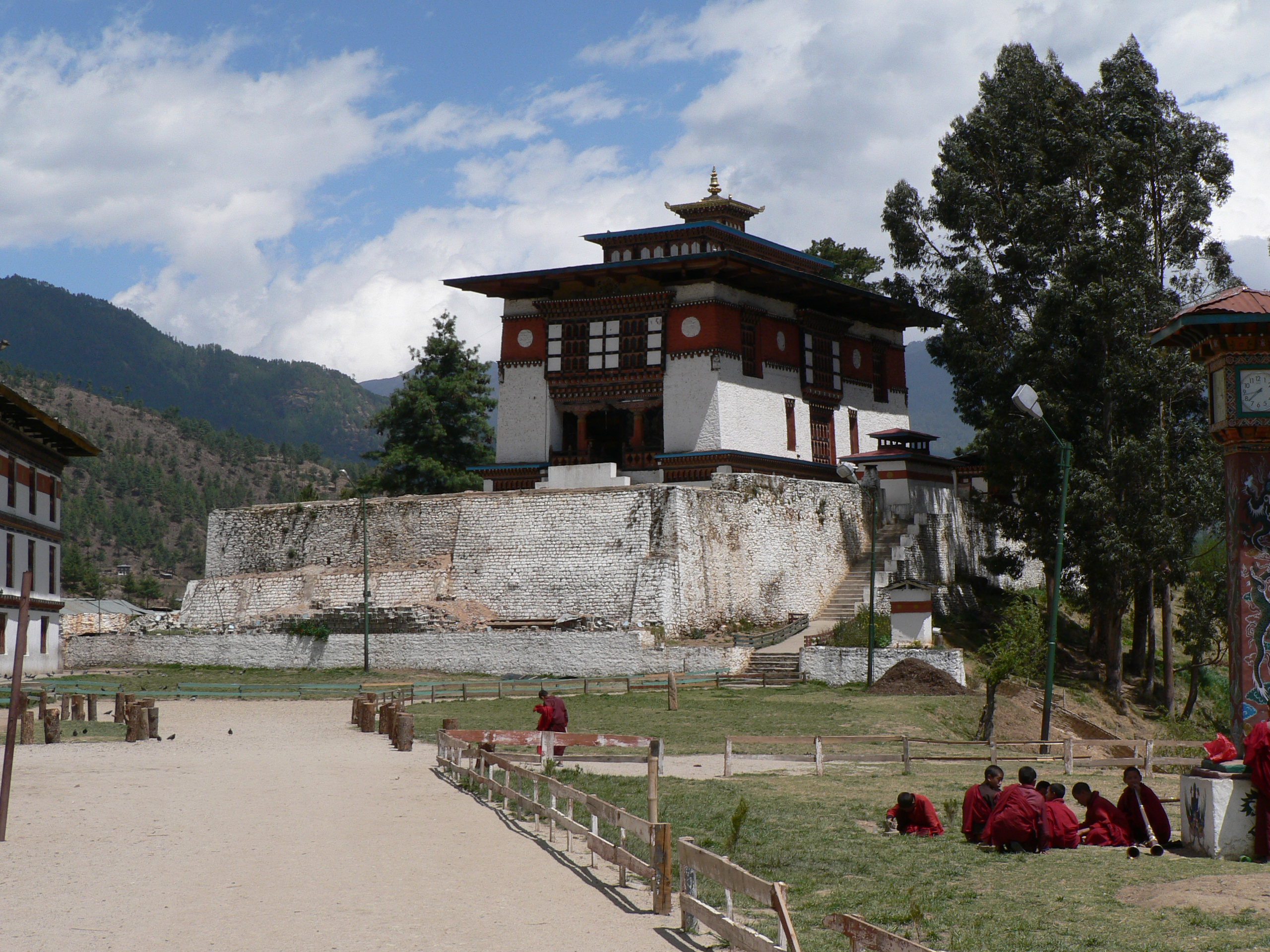
- Dechen Phodrang monastic school

- Location within Bhutan

Religion
- Affiliation: Tibetan Buddhism

Location
- Location: Thimphu, Bhutan
- Country: Bhutan
- Interactive map of Dechen Phodrang Monastery
- Coordinates: 27°30′4″N 89°37′57″E

Architecture
- Founder: Gyelwa Lhanangpa

Dechen Phrodrang, meaning "Palace of Great Bliss", is a Buddhist monastery in Thimphu, Bhutan. It is located to the north of the city.

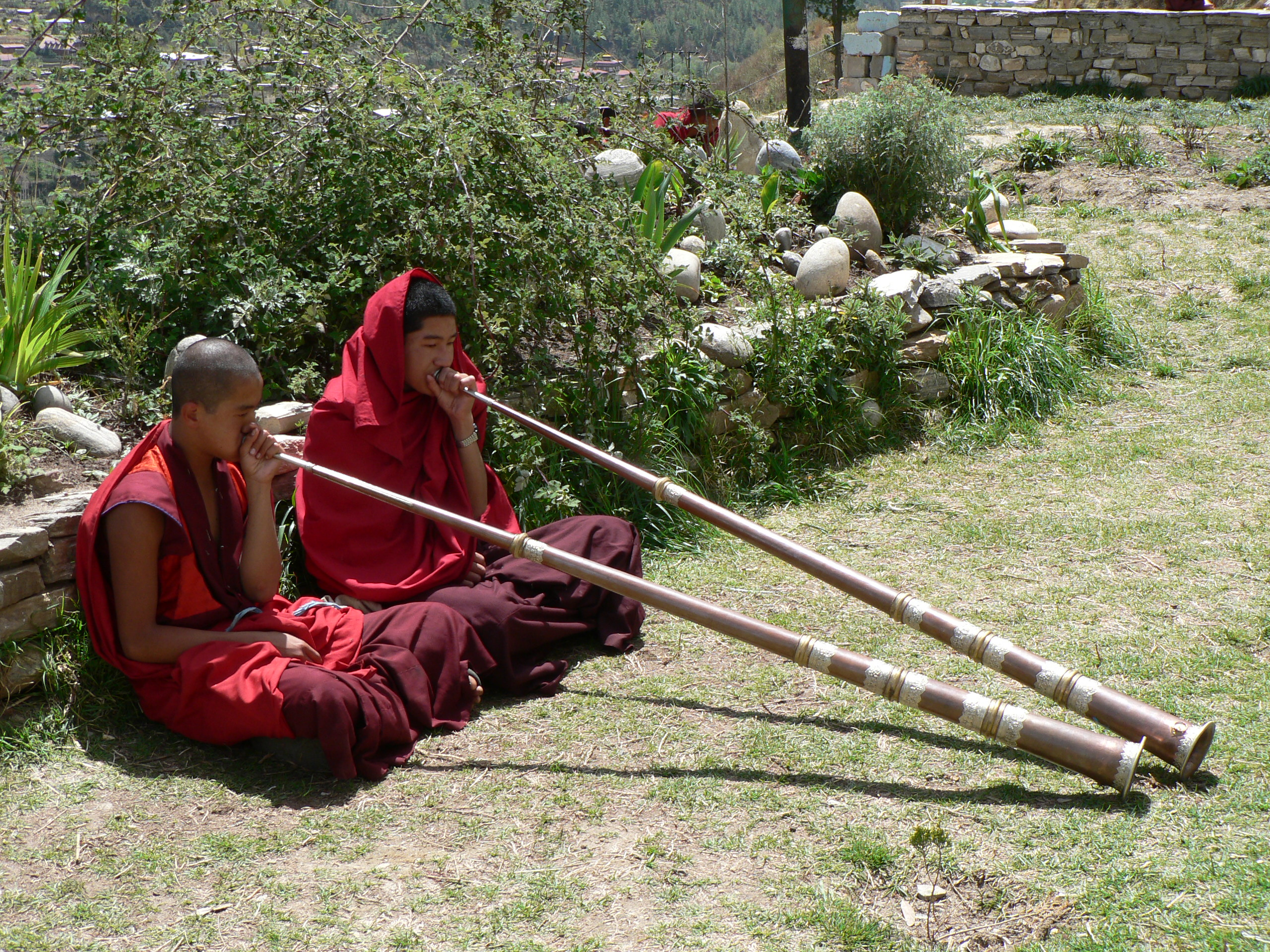
Monks at Dechen Phodrang

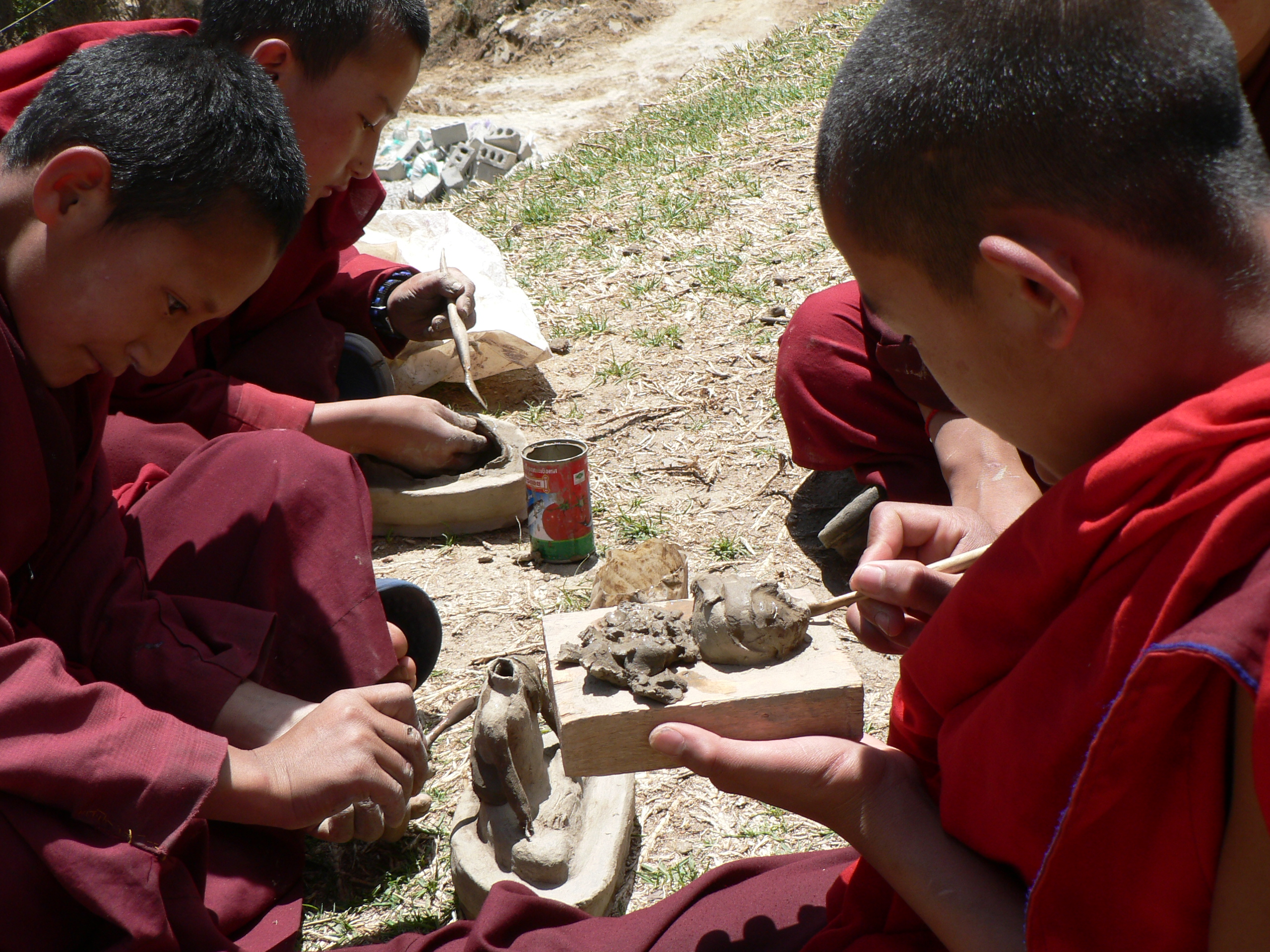
Monks at Dechen Phodrang

In 1971 it became a monastic school, called a lobdra, and currently it has 450 student monks enrolled in eight-year courses with a staff of 15. The monastery contains a number of important historical Bhutanese artifacts including 12th-century paintings monitored by UNESCO and a noted statue of Shabdrung Ngawang Namgyal on the upper floor. In the downstairs chapel, there is a central Sakyamuni Buddha.
