= Yangtse Gewog =

Yangtse Gewog གཡང་རྩེ་
- Gewog
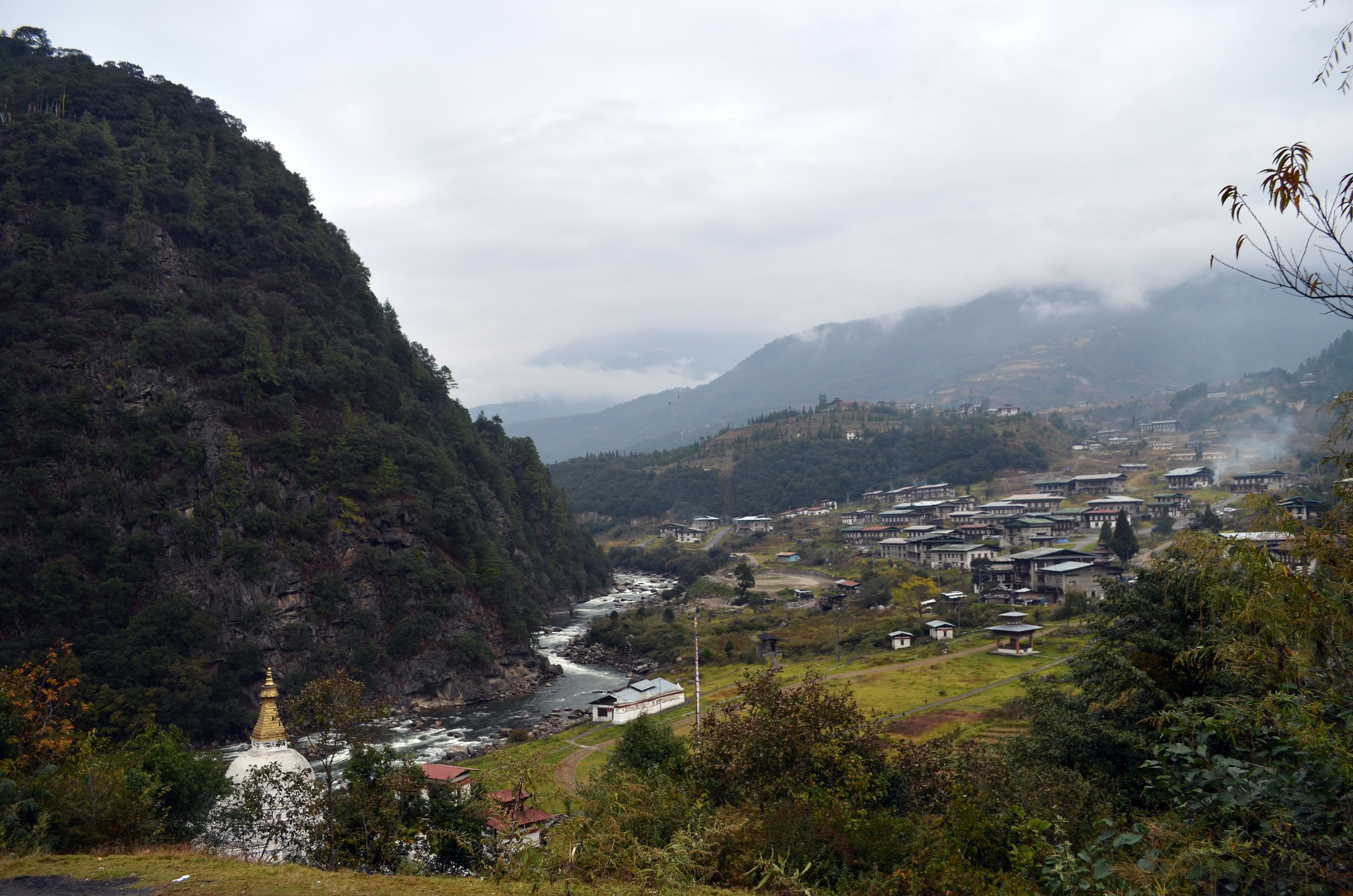

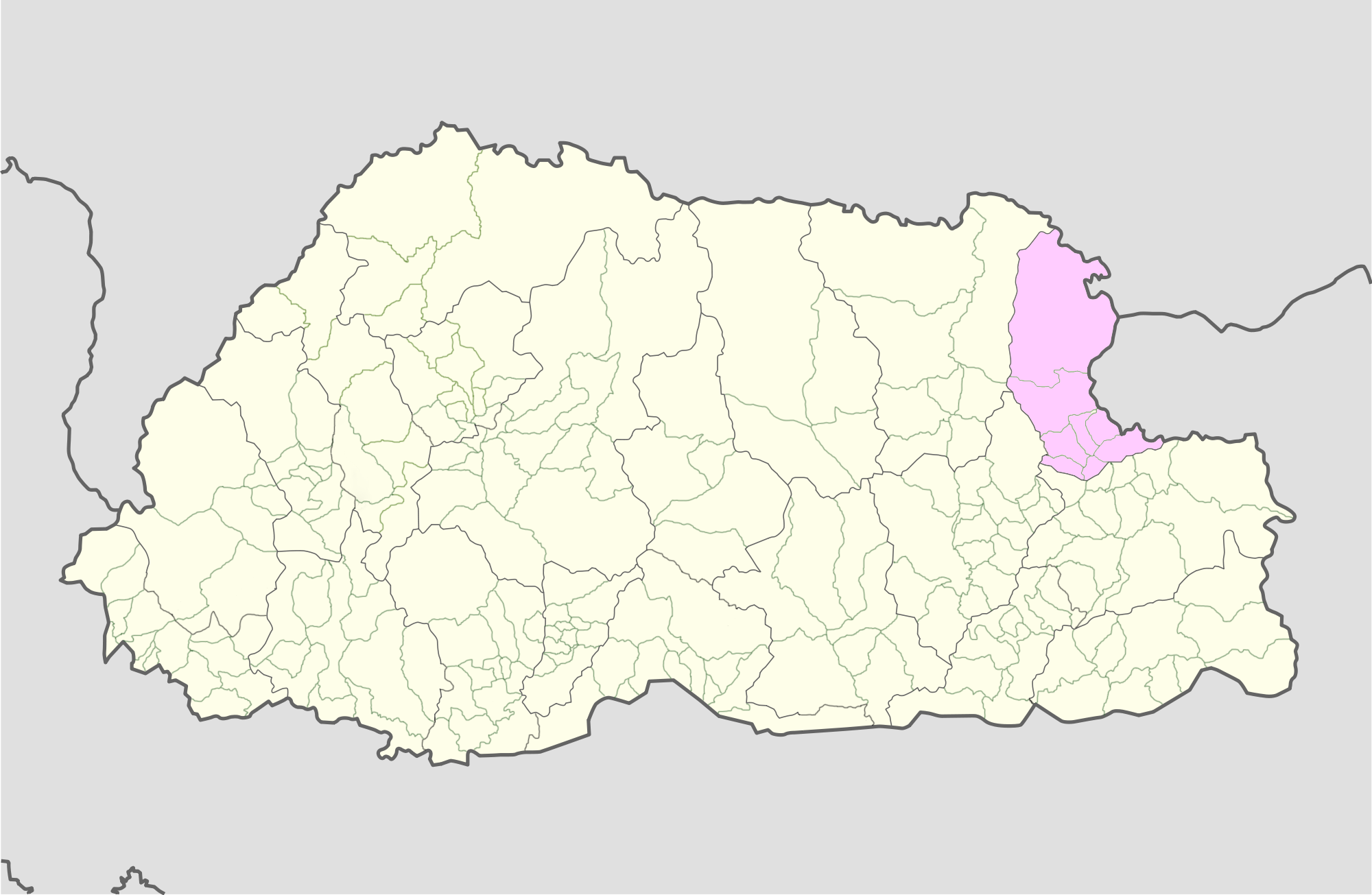
- Country: Bhutan
- District: Trashiyangtse District
- Time zone: UTC+6 (BTT)

Yangtse Gewog (Dzongkha: གཡང་རྩེ་) is a gewog (village block) of Trashiyangtse District, Bhutan. It was formerly known as Trashiyangtse.

Religious sites include Chortencora and Old Dzong or Dongdhi Dzong.
