= Chorten Kora =

Stupa in Trashiyangtse, Bhutan

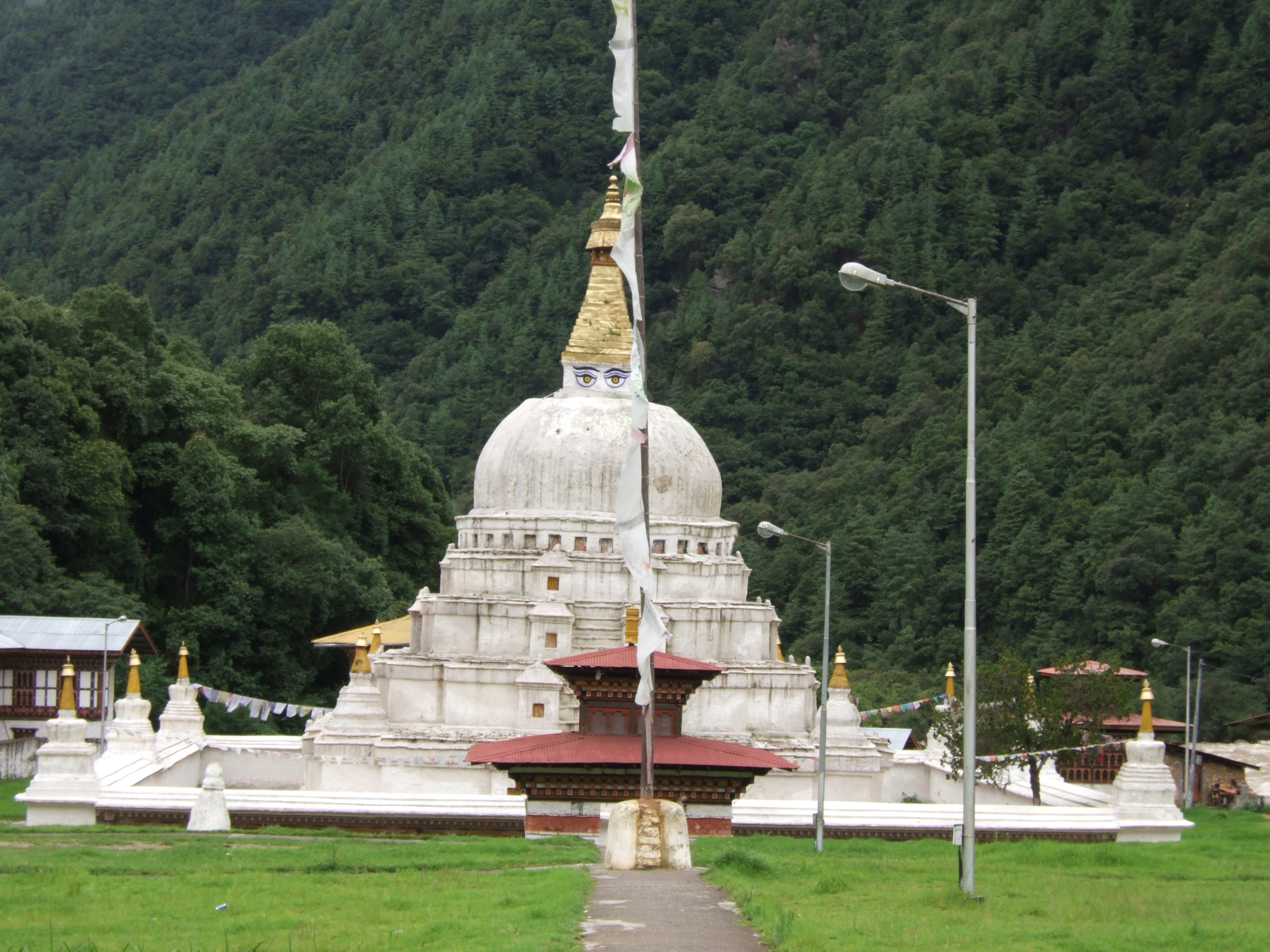
Chorten Kora (in 2006), Trashiyangtse District, Bhutan

Chorten Kora is an important stupa next to the Khorlo-Chu(Kholongchu) River in Trashi Yangtse, in East Bhutan. The stupa was built in 1740 by Lama Ngawang Lodrö (3rd abbot of Rigsum Goenpa), the nephew of Zhabdrung Ngawang Namgyal in memory of his late uncle Lam Jangchub Gyeltshen and to subdue a harmful demon believed to have been living at the site where the stupa is now located. The stupa is modeled after the famous Boudhanath stupa in Nepal popularly known as Jarung Khashor. The similar stupa can also be found at Zemithang in Tawang known as Gorsam Chorten.

Chorten Kora took twelve years to construct and was consecrated by Je Yonten Thaye. The demon that had harmed the people of the valley was apparently subdued and banished. Thereafter, it is said that the people of the valley continue to live in peace and harmony.

== Chorten Kora Festivals ==
There is an annual Dakpa Kora (circumambulation of the Chorten by the Dakpas) festival held on the 15th of the first lunar month, and a Drukpa Kora (circumambulation of the Chorten by the Bhutanese) festival held at the end of the first lunar month which celebrate the stupa. These festivals are attended by Dakpa people of the neighboring Tawang District of Arunachal Pradesh in India, and Bhutanese from Trashi Yangtse, Trashigang, and Kurtoe.

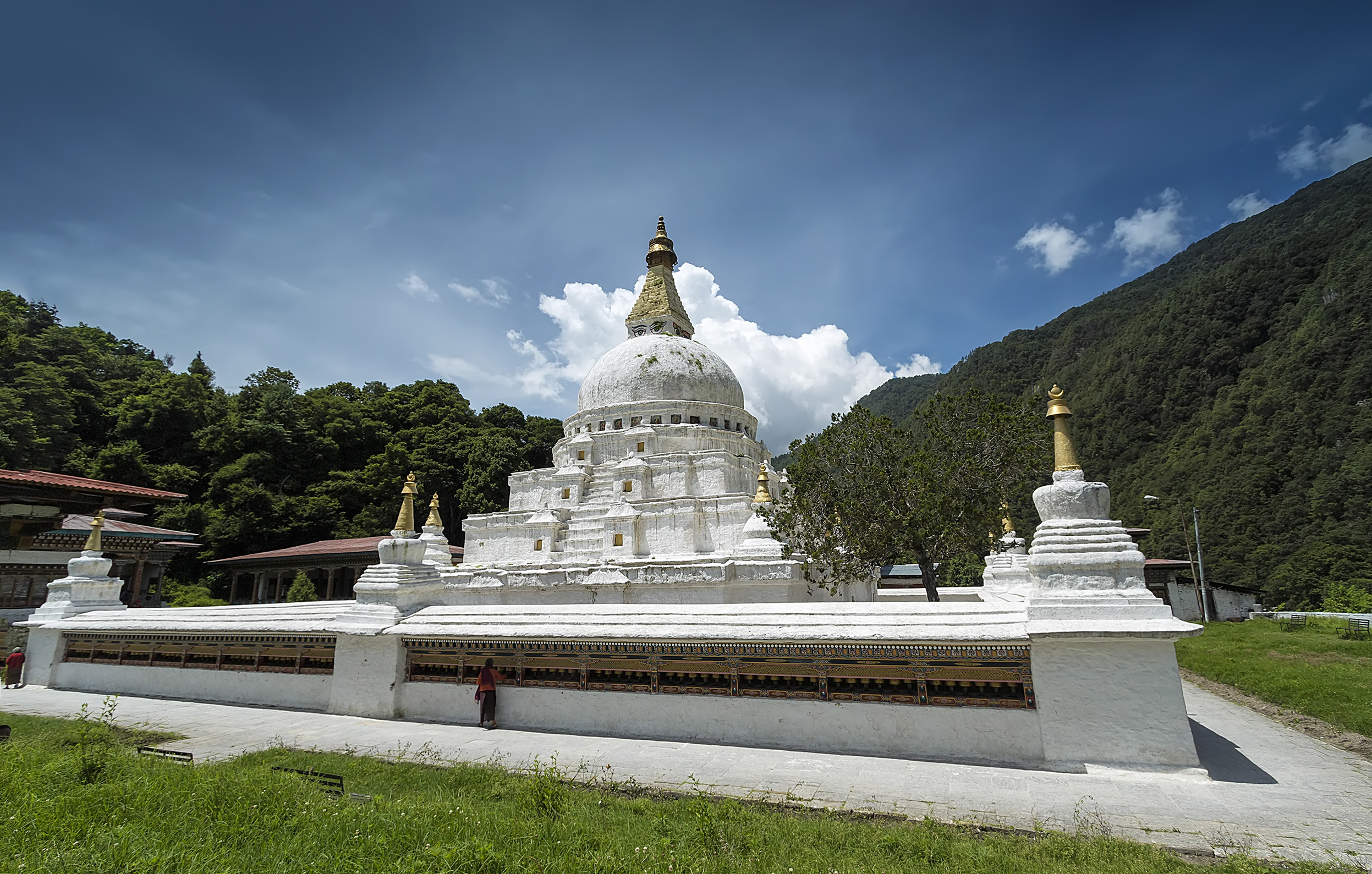
Chorten Kora

A popular belief is that when the stupa was constructed, a pious Dakini princess from neighboring Arunachal Pradesh in India entombed herself within, as the Yeshe Semba, to meditate on behalf of all beings. A popular Bhutanese (Dzongkha language) film "Chorten Kora" is based on this legend.

== See also ==
- Chendebji Chorten, another Nepalese style chorten in Bhutan
