= Bumdeling Gewog =

Bumdeling Gewog བུམ་སྡེ་གླིང་
- Gewog
- Country: Bhutan
- District: Trashiyangtse District
- Time zone: UTC+6 (BTT)

Bumdeling Gewog (Dzongkha: བུམ་སྡེ་གླིང་) (sometimes spelt Bomdeling) is a gewog (village block) of Trashiyangtse District, Bhutan.
