= Trashiyangtse District =

District of Bhutan

Coordinates: 27°40′N 91°25′E

Trashiyangtse District བཀྲ་ཤིས་གཡང་རྩེ་རྫོང་ཁག།
- District
- Location of Trashiyangtse district within Bhutan
- Country: Bhutan
- Headquarters: Trashiyangtse

Area
  - Total: 1,438 km^{2} (555 sq mi)

Population (2017)
  - Total: 17,300
  - Density: 12.0/km^{2} (31.2/sq mi)
- Time zone: UTC+6 (BTT)
- HDI (2019): 0.588 medium · 18th of 20
- Website: www.trashiyangtse.gov.bt

Trashiyangtse District (Dzongkha: བཀྲ་ཤིས་གཡང་རྩེ་རྫོང་ཁག།, romanized: bkra shis g.yang rtse rdzong khag) is one of the twenty dzongkhags (districts) comprising Bhutan. It was created in 1992 when Trashiyangtse district was split off from Trashigang District. Trashiyangtse covers an area of 1,437.9 square kilometres (555.2 sq mi). At an elevation of 1750–1880 m, Trashi yangtse dzongkhag is rich of culture filled with sacred places blessed by Guru Rimpoche and dwelled by Yangtseps, Tshanglas, Bramis from Tawang, Khengpas from Zhemgang and Kurtoeps from Lhuentse.

Trashiyangtse was named by Terton Pema Lingpa during his visit in 15th century meaning; (the fortress of the auspicious fortune).

The northern part of Trashiyangtse encompasses the skills of woodturning and paper making (dzongkha: དལ་ཤོག). Southern part mainly depends on cash crops and animals.

The district seat is Trashiyangtse.

== Languages ==
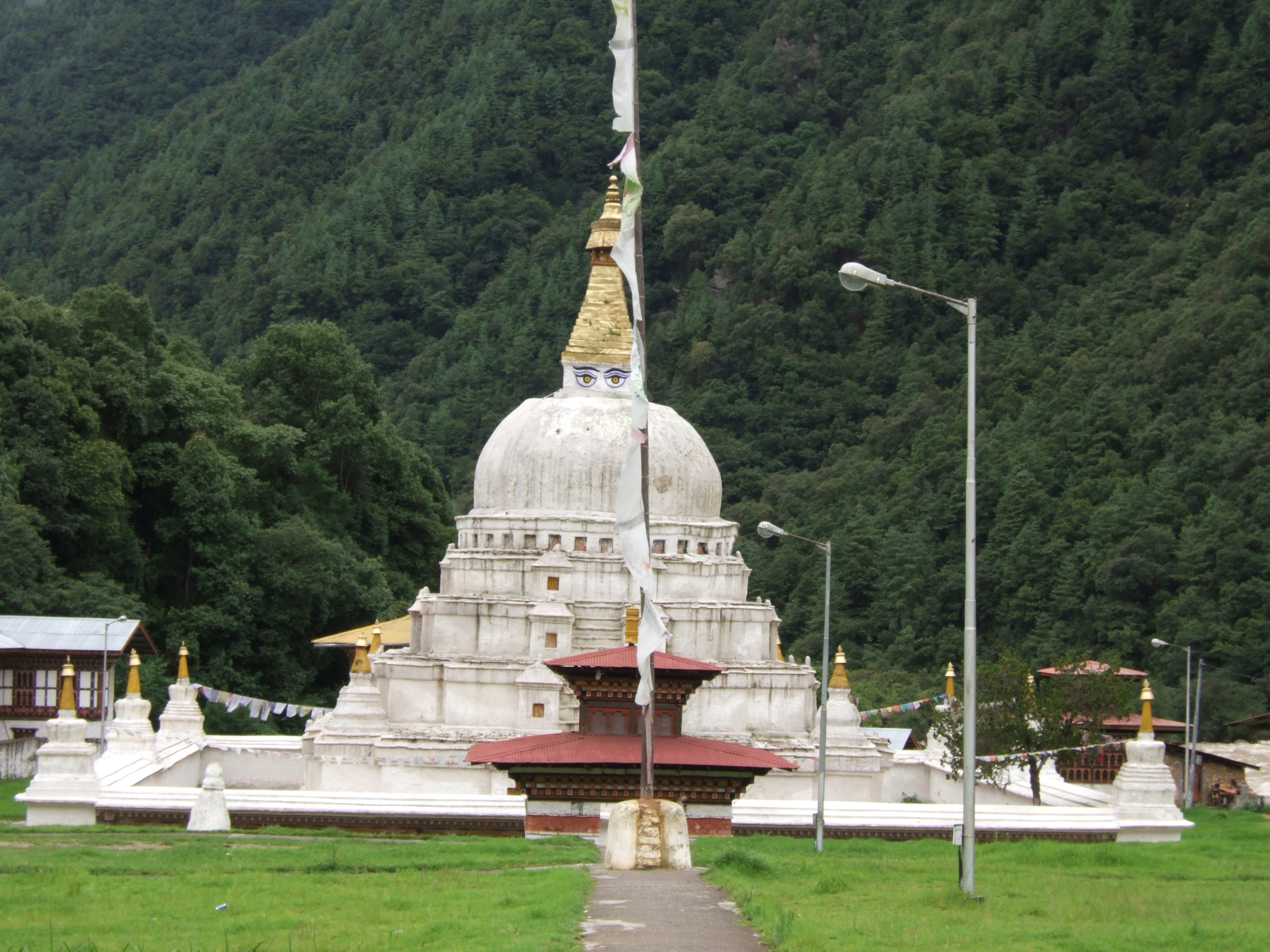
Chorten Kora, Trashiyangtse District, Bhutan.

Three major languages are spoken in Trashiyangtse. In the north, including Bumdeling inhabitants speak Dzala. In the south, Tshangla (Sharchopkha), the lingua franca of eastern Bhutan, is spoken in Jamkhar, Khamdang, Yalang and Ramjar Gewogs. In Tomzhangtshen Gewog, residents speak Chocha Ngacha and khengkha.

== Historical sites ==
- Omba Ney, the “Taktsang of East” is the first of three sacred sites of Guru Rinpoche where the letter “OM” is seen on the rock face.
- Thrue Goen Pema Woedling Dratshang
- Gomphu Kora is a meditative cave where Guru Rinpoche meditated and subdued a demon called Myongkhapa.
- Choeten Kora
- Gongza Ney is a sacred place where Khandro Yeshey Tshogyal offered tea to Guru Rinpoche at noontime while he went to Gom kora to subdue a demon.
- Dechen Phodrang Ney
- Rigsum Goenpa

== Administrative divisions ==
Trashiyangste District is divided into eight village blocks (or gewogs):

- Bumdeling Gewog
- Jamkhar Gewog
- Khamdang Gewog
- Ramjar Gewog
- Toetsho Gewog
- Tomzhangtshen Gewog
- Yalang Gewog
- Yangtse Gewog

== Protected areas ==
Trashiyangtse District contains Kholong Chu Wildlife Sanctuary, established in 1993, itself part of the larger Bumdeling Wildlife Sanctuary. Bumdeling Wildlife Sanctuary currently covers the northern half of Trashiyangtse (the gewogs of Bumdeling and Yangtse), as well as substantial portions of neighboring districts.

== Climate ==
Climate data for Trashiyangtse, elevation 1,830 m (6,000 ft), (1996–2017 normals)
Month	Jan	Feb	Mar	Apr	May	Jun	Jul	Aug	Sep	Oct	Nov	Dec	Year
Record high °C (°F)	21.5 (70.7)	24.5 (76.1)	28.0 (82.4)	31.0 (87.8)	30.0 (86.0)	32.5 (90.5)	30.5 (86.9)	30.5 (86.9)	30.5 (86.9)	29.5 (85.1)	24.0 (75.2)	22.5 (72.5)	32.5 (90.5)
Mean daily maximum °C (°F)	13.5 (56.3)	16.0 (60.8)	18.4 (65.1)	20.7 (69.3)	22.7 (72.9)	24.1 (75.4)	24.4 (75.9)	24.4 (75.9)	23.7 (74.7)	21.3 (70.3)	17.8 (64.0)	14.8 (58.6)	20.2 (68.3)
Daily mean °C (°F)	8.0 (46.4)	10.5 (50.9)	12.9 (55.2)	15.5 (59.9)	18.0 (64.4)	20.4 (68.7)	21.1 (70.0)	20.9 (69.6)	19.9 (67.8)	16.3 (61.3)	12.3 (54.1)	9.2 (48.6)	15.4 (59.7)
Mean daily minimum °C (°F)	2.5 (36.5)	5.0 (41.0)	7.4 (45.3)	10.2 (50.4)	13.2 (55.8)	16.6 (61.9)	17.8 (64.0)	17.4 (63.3)	16.1 (61.0)	11.3 (52.3)	6.8 (44.2)	3.6 (38.5)	10.7 (51.2)
Record low °C (°F)	−5.0 (23.0)	−5.0 (23.0)	0.0 (32.0)	2.5 (36.5)	6.0 (42.8)	9.5 (49.1)	12.0 (53.6)	11.5 (52.7)	9.0 (48.2)	2.0 (35.6)	−1.5 (29.3)	−5.0 (23.0)	−5.0 (23.0)
Average rainfall mm (inches)	7.7 (0.30)	21.1 (0.83)	49.6 (1.95)	103.8 (4.09)	137.0 (5.39)	172.7 (6.80)	220.1 (8.67)	210.6 (8.29)	153.9 (6.06)	75.1 (2.96)	11.1 (0.44)	2.8 (0.11)	1,165.5 (45.89)
Average relative humidity (%)	70.8	70.7	70.1	72.7	73.6	78.0	82.3	81.4	79.8	73.1	71.8	71.9	74.7
Source: National Center for Hydrology and Meteorology

== See also ==
- Districts of Bhutan
- Kurtoed Province
