= Tenchen =

Tenchen can refer to:

- Tenchen Creek, a stream in British Columbia, Canada
- Tenchen Choeling nunnery, a Buddhist College in Bhutan
- Tenchen Glacier, a glacier in British Columbia, Canada
- Tenchen Member, a geological member in British Columbia, Canada
