= Drukgyal Dzong =

Buddhist monastery in Bhutan

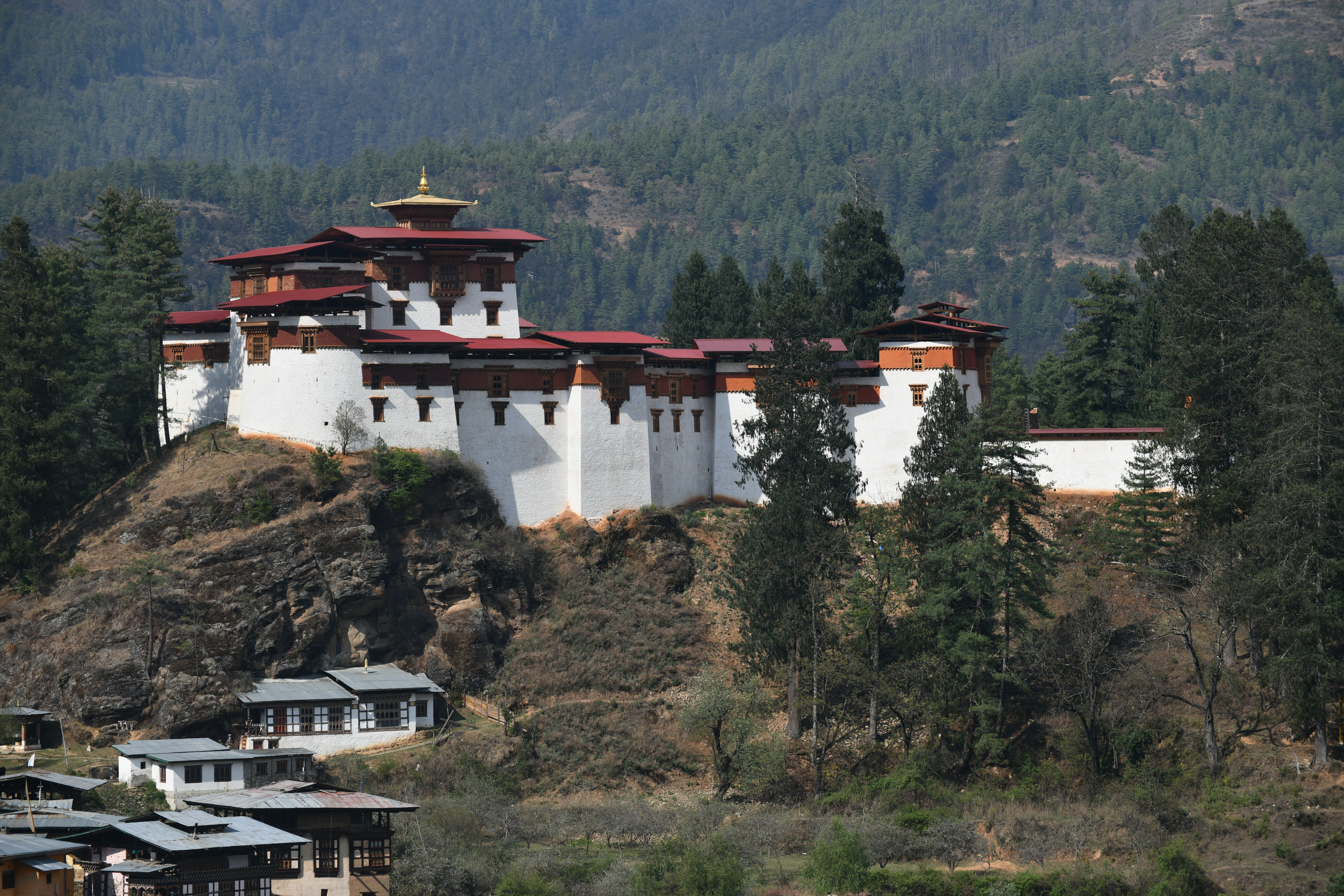
- Drukgyal Dzong after restoration

- Location within Bhutan

Religion
- Affiliation: Tibetan Buddhism

Location
- Coordinates: 27°30′11″N 89°19′21″E

Architecture
- Established: 1649; 377 years ago

Drukgyal Dzong (Dzongkha: འབྲུག་རྒྱལ་རྫོང་།), also known as Drukgyel Dzong, is a fortress and Buddhist monastery, located in the upper part of the Paro District, Bhutan. The dzong was built by Tenzin Drukdra in 1649 at the behest of Zhabdrung Ngawang Namgyal, to commemorate victory over an invasion from Tibet. While ruling as the second Paro Penlop, Drukdra named the fortress Drukgyal Dzong, 'The fortress of the victorious Drukpas'. Nearby can be seen the local temple of the people of phangdo, which contains an image of Tara as the main object of worship.

== Destruction by Fire ==
In the early 1950s, Drukgyel Dzong was almost completely destroyed by fire. It is listed on Bhutan's tentative list for UNESCO inclusion.

The ruins were comparatively well preserved and how it functioned was still clear. While most of its timber components, such as roof trusses, door and window frames, floors and ceilings, were destroyed, most of the stone and rammed earth wall structures survived, Revealing how the Dzong operated as a defensive fortress in medieval times.

== Restoration and Reconsecration ==
In 2016, to celebrate the birth of the Crown Prince, Jigme Namgyel Wangchuck, as well as to commemorate two other significant events, namely, the arrival of Zhabdrung Ngawang Namgyel to Bhutan in 1616 AD, and the commemoration of the birth year of Guru Rinpoche, the Prime Minister Lyonchen Tshering Tobgay announced that the Dzong would be rebuilt and reinstated to its former glory. The announcement and ground breaking ceremony took place on February 6, a day after the Prince was born.

The restoration of the dzong received a budget of 500M Nu (approx. 5.29M USD) and was projected to be completed in June of 2022. By November 2021, reconstruction was reported to be about 87% complete, including repainting in the traditional red and white and reconstruction of the three watchtowers and two water towers.

== Sacred sites nearby ==
The Dzong commands a view of many of the sacred sites of Paro, including Jowo Drakegang, Bumo Pundunmagang, the cremation ground of Namgola, the sacred cliff of Chagri Tsen, Draknang Gonpa, Lomochi Gonpa, Gorinang, Tenchen Gonpa, Kichu Lakhang and Santsam Chorten.

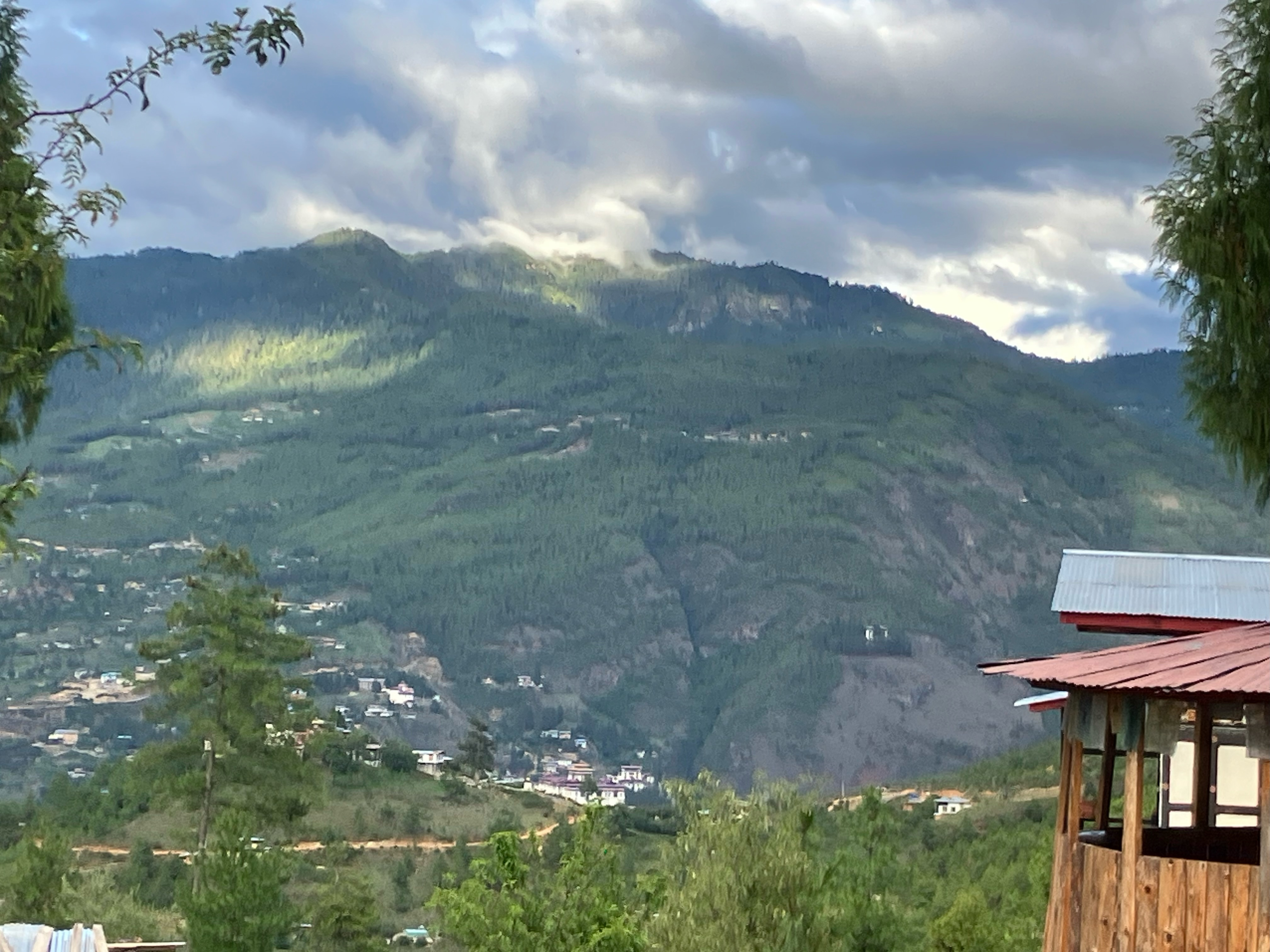
View of Drukgyal Dzong from Tenchen Gonpa

== Glory of Bhutan ==
- Drukgyal Dzong
- About Drukgyal Dzong
