= Tenchen Choeling nunnery =

Buddhist College (shedra) for nuns

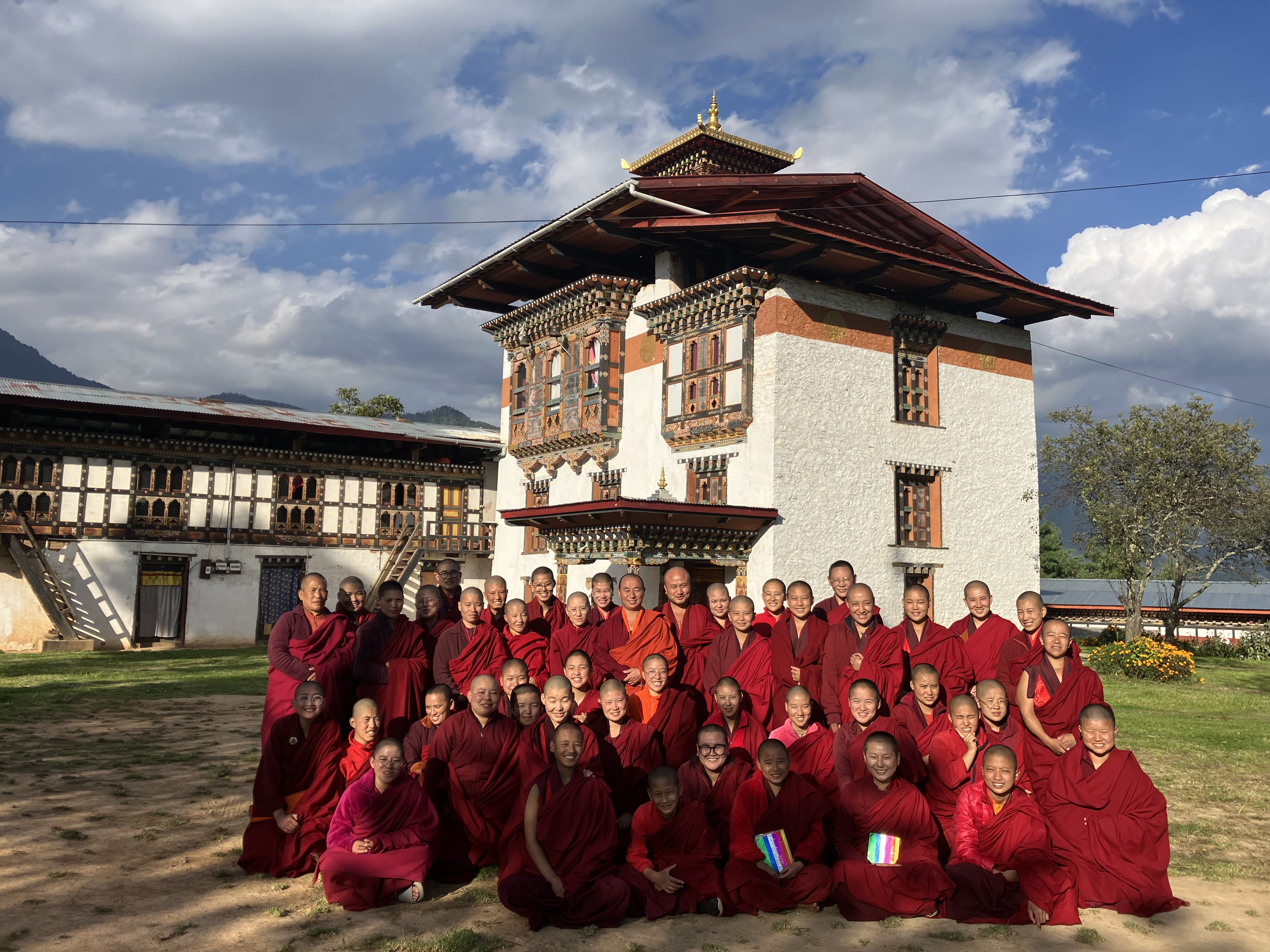
The nuns and teachers of Tenchen Choeling Nunnery

Tenchen Choeling Nunnery (also known as Tencha Goempa, Tengchenkha Gonpa and Tengchen Goemba) is a Buddhist College (shedra) for nuns, situated above Kyichu Lhakhang, overlooking the Paro Valley in Bhutan. The Dratshang’s Dorji Lopon appointed Khenpo Kinga Norbu as the new Principal in January 2023, following his three years as Lam of the Chimi Lhakhang in Punakha. He had also served as head teacher at Semtokha Shedra.

== History ==
The site on which the nunnery is built is considered sacred - the original Gonpa was founded in the 14th century by Kecho Barawa Gyeltshen Pelzang, said to be a supreme being. The site is considered one of the abodes of the five long-life sisters or dakinis.

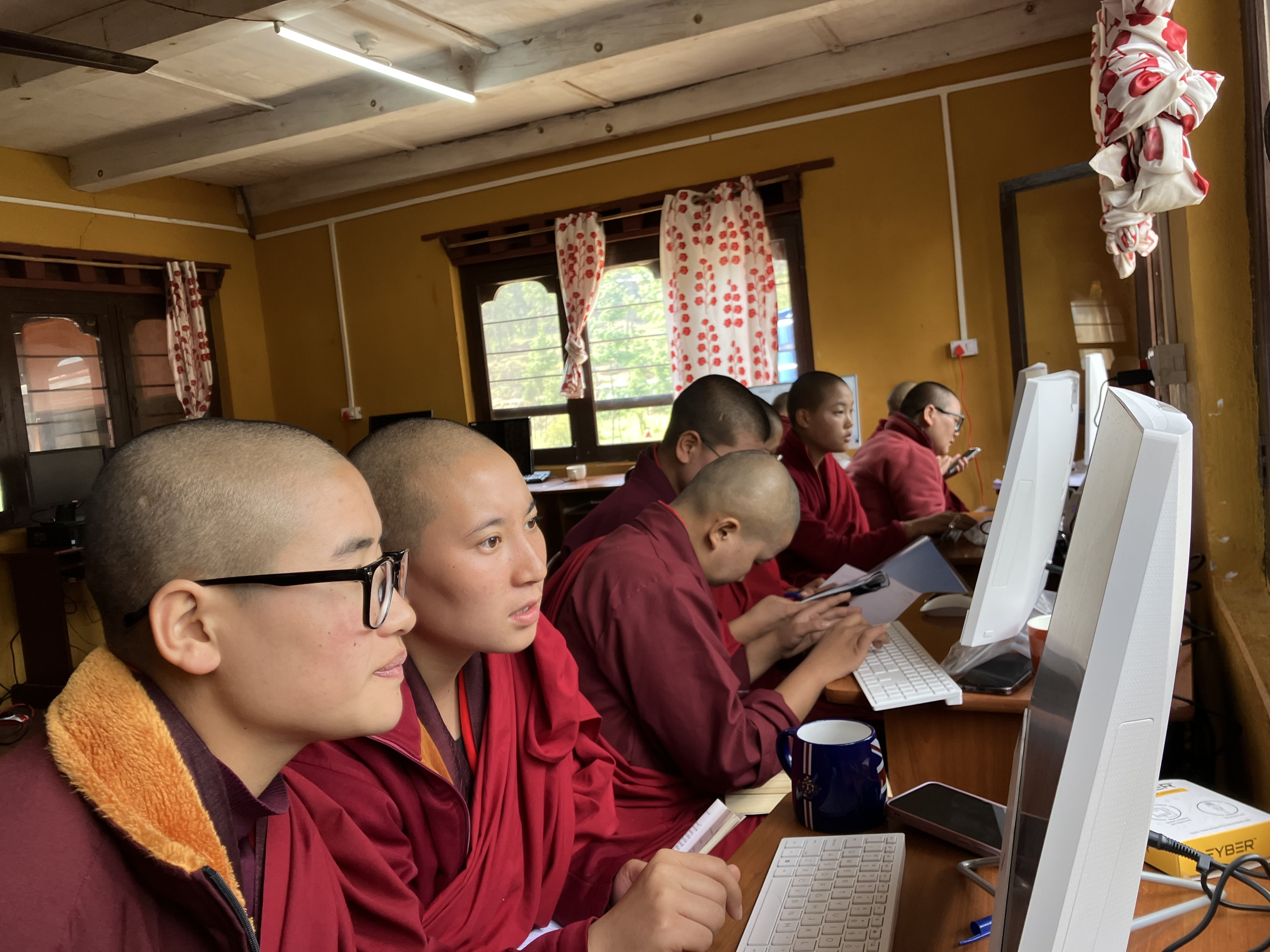
Tenchen Choeling nuns at a Dzongkha Wikipedia edit-a-thon in October 2023.

The five sisters are revered as dharma protectors by the Kagyu and the Nyingma schools of Vajrayana Buddhism. Their legend reaches across many Himalayan cultures and communities. The Sherpas believe Mount Everest is home to Miyo Lang Zangma and they pray to her for protection before they climb.

Paro is believed to host sites for all the Tsheringma sisters, making it a prosperous valley. Long-life and blessings is said to accrue to those who visit all five sites in one day. The sacred abodes of the sisters are Dzongdrakha (Tinghi Zhay Zangma – Deity of the East), Paro Gangtey Lhakhang (Talkar Dro Zangma – North), Drangoe Gonpa (Tashi Tsheringma – Centre), Tengchen Gonpa (Miyo Lang Zangma – South), and Ramna (Choepen Drin Zangma – West).

1. Tashi Tseringma, (Tib. བཀྲ་ཤིས་ཚེ་རིང་མ་, Wyl. bkra shis tshe ring ma)
2. Ting gi Shyal Zangma, (Tib. མཐིང་གི་ཞལ་བཟང་མ་, Wyl. mthing gi zhal bzang ma)
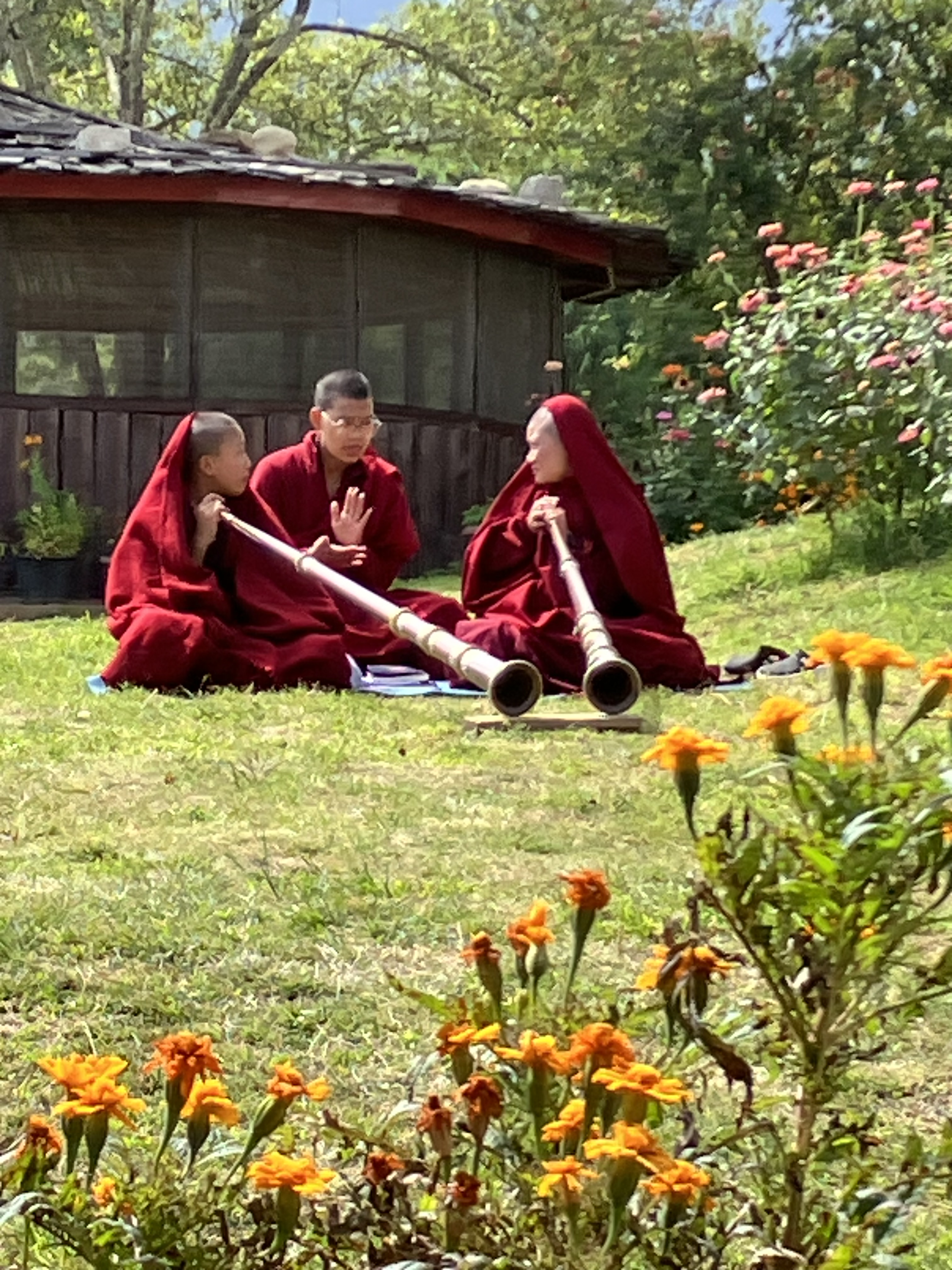
  Tenchen Choeling nuns practise dung (trumpet)
3. Chöpen Drin Zangma, (Tib. ཅོད་པན་མགྲིན་བཟང་མ་, Wyl. cod pan mgrin bzang ma)
4. Miyo Lang Zangma, (Tib. མི་གཡོ་གླང་བཟང་མ་, Wyl. mi g.yo glang bzang ma) and
5. Talkar Dro Zangma, (Tib. གཏལ་དཀར་འགྲོ་བཟང་མ་, Wyl. gtal dkar ‘gro bzang ma).

The temple Tenchen Choeling is home to sacred statues of the sister, Miyo Lang Zangma, depicted riding a tigress and a female yak.

== The nuns story ==
In Bhutan monasteries for men and boys are funded by the state or have private benefactors, but nunneries receive no government funding. According to Bhutan Nuns Foundation, many young women in Bhutan become nuns at some stage of life and serve as role models for all Bhutanese women, with their dedication to a spiritual life over consumerist pursuits. They play a crucial role in preserving Bhutan’s traditions and culture, which is essential to achieve the country's Gross National Happiness aims.

The sacred site became a shedra when Kila Gonpa, which is located 3,500m above sea level, just below Chelela Pass, was considered too dangerous for residents. The nuns were moved to Tenchen Choeling but continue to return to Kila Gonpa after they finish their studies to enter their three-year retreat. It accommodates up to 17 nuns at a time.

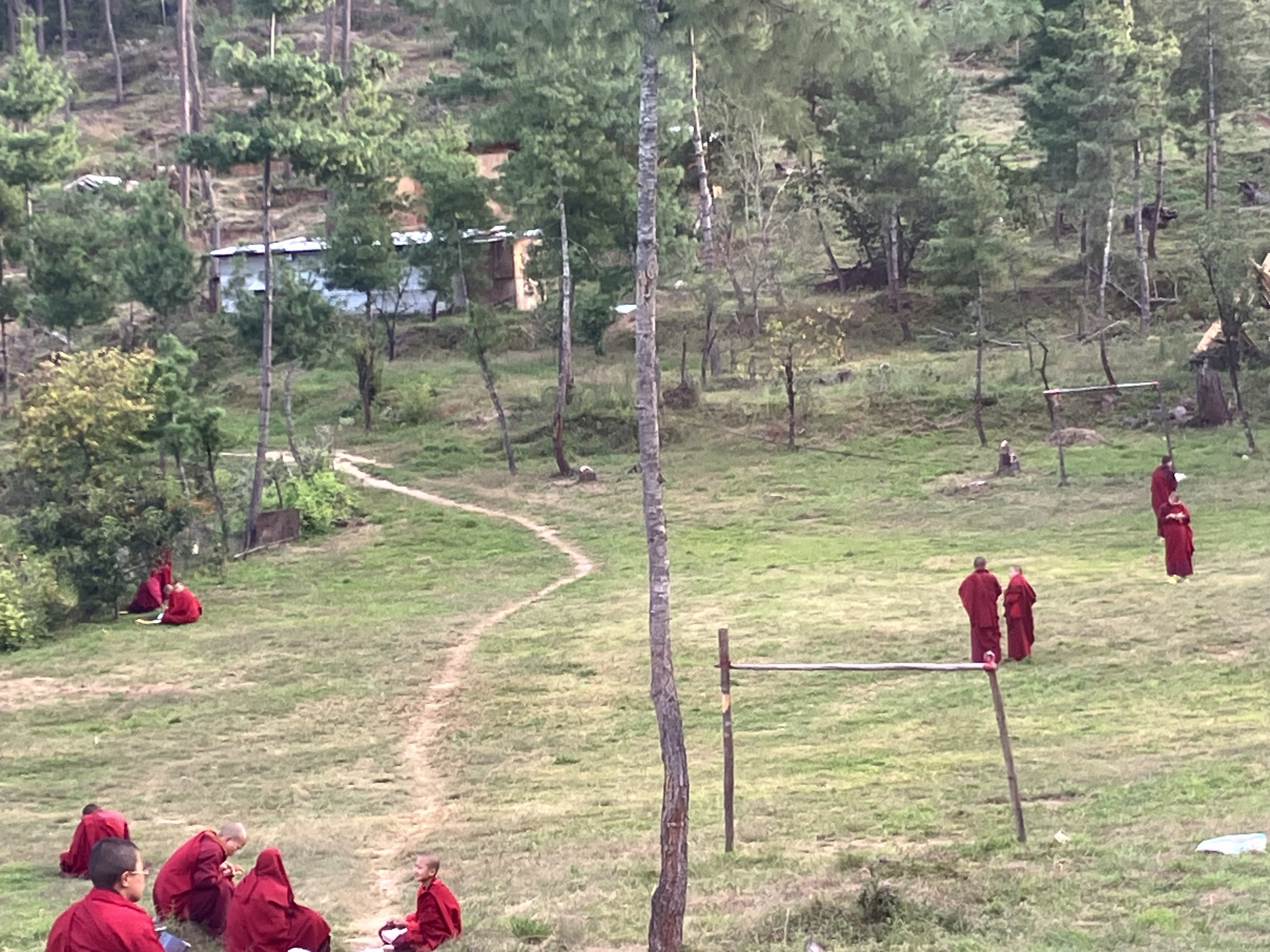
Nuns study on the football field they built at Tenchen Choeling Goempa

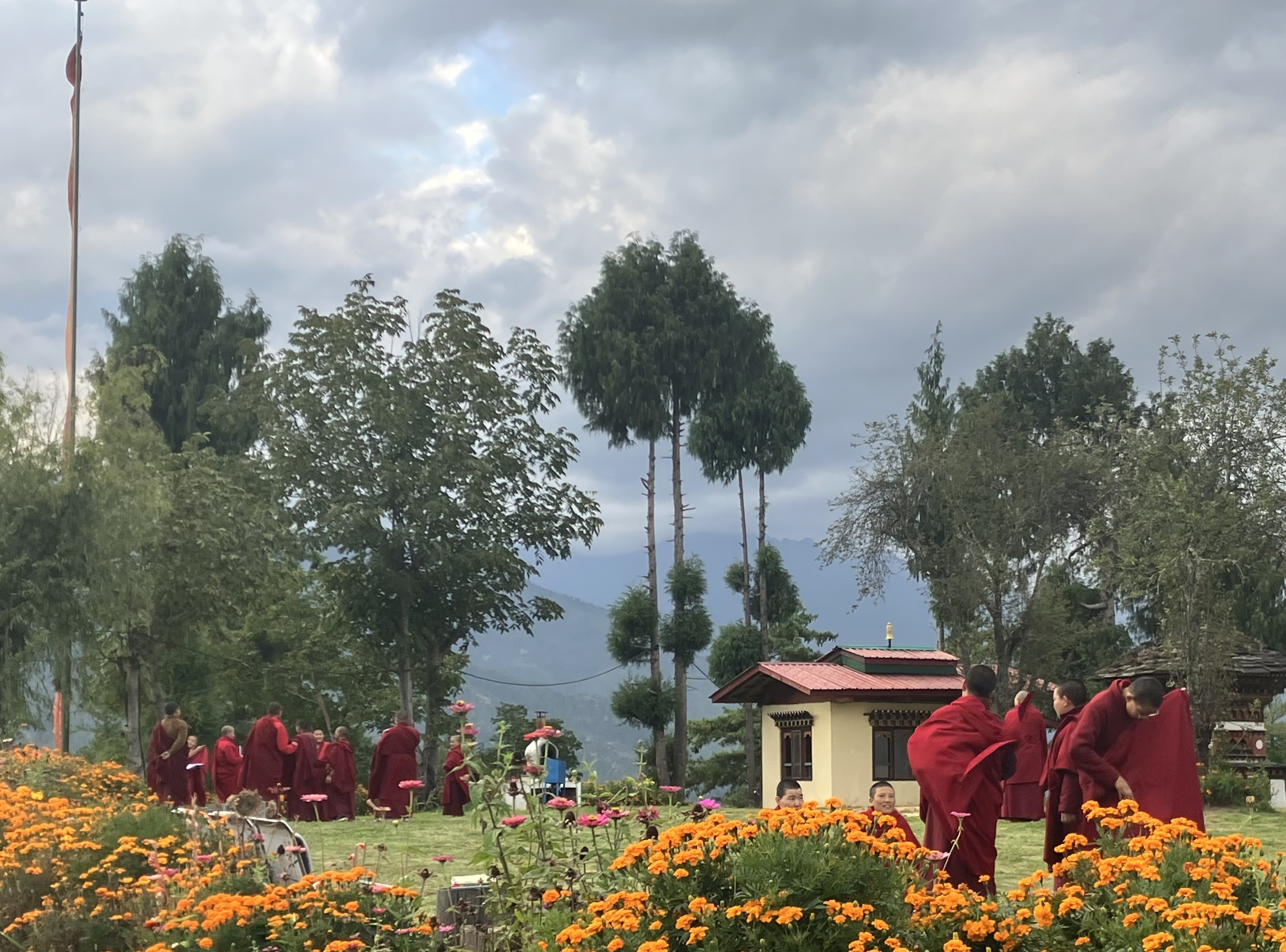
The nuns of Tenchen Choeling Nunnery debate Buddhist philosophy high above Paro valley

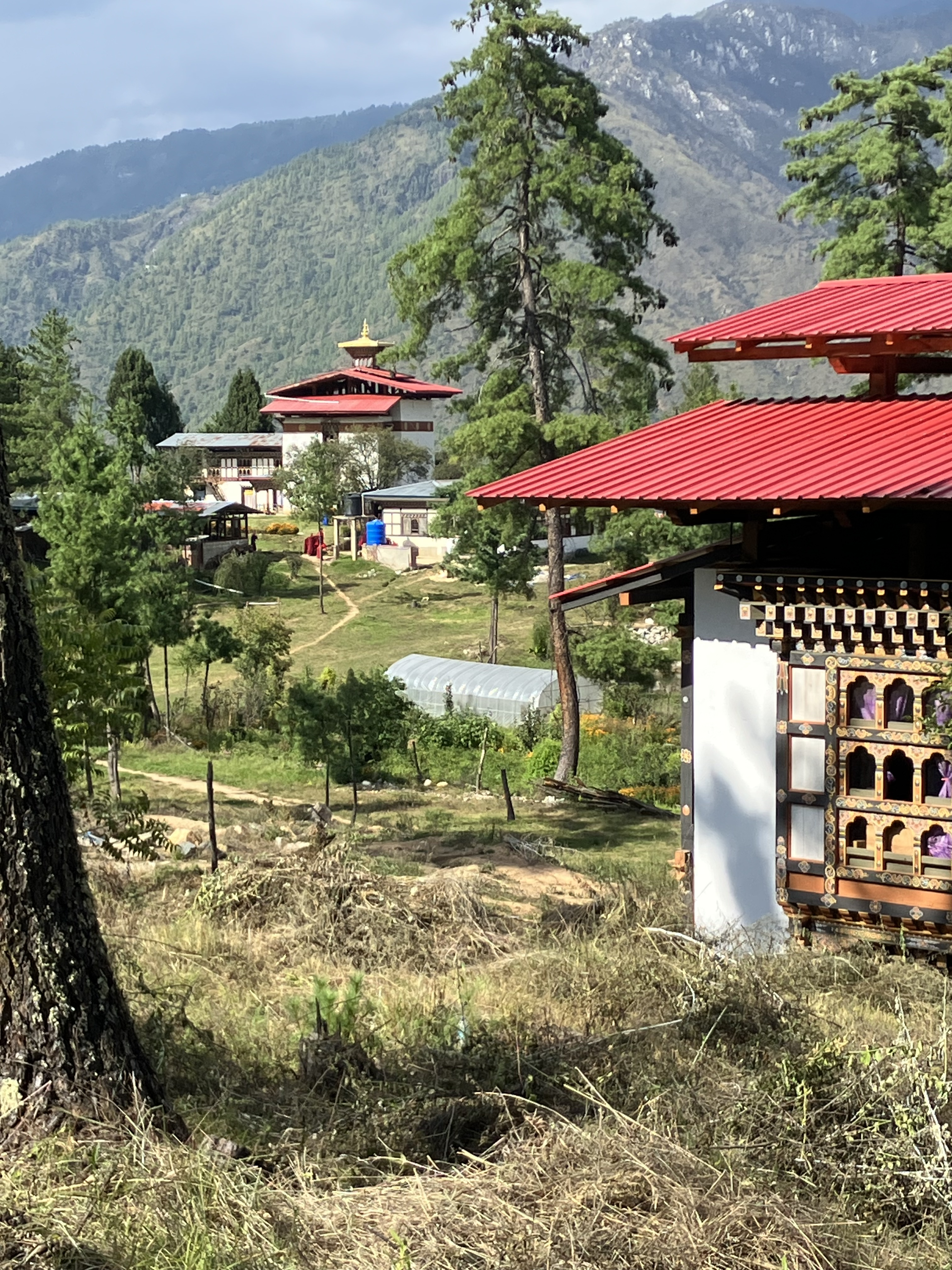
Tenchen Choeling Nunnery, also known as Tencha Goempa.
