= Byaradingka =

- Location in Bhutan
- Coordinates: 27°46′N 89°27′E
- Country: Bhutan
- District: Paro District
- Time zone: UTC+6 (BTT)

Byaradingka is a town in Paro District in western Bhutan.
