= Lamgong Gewog =

Lamgong Gewog ལམ་གོང་
- Gewog
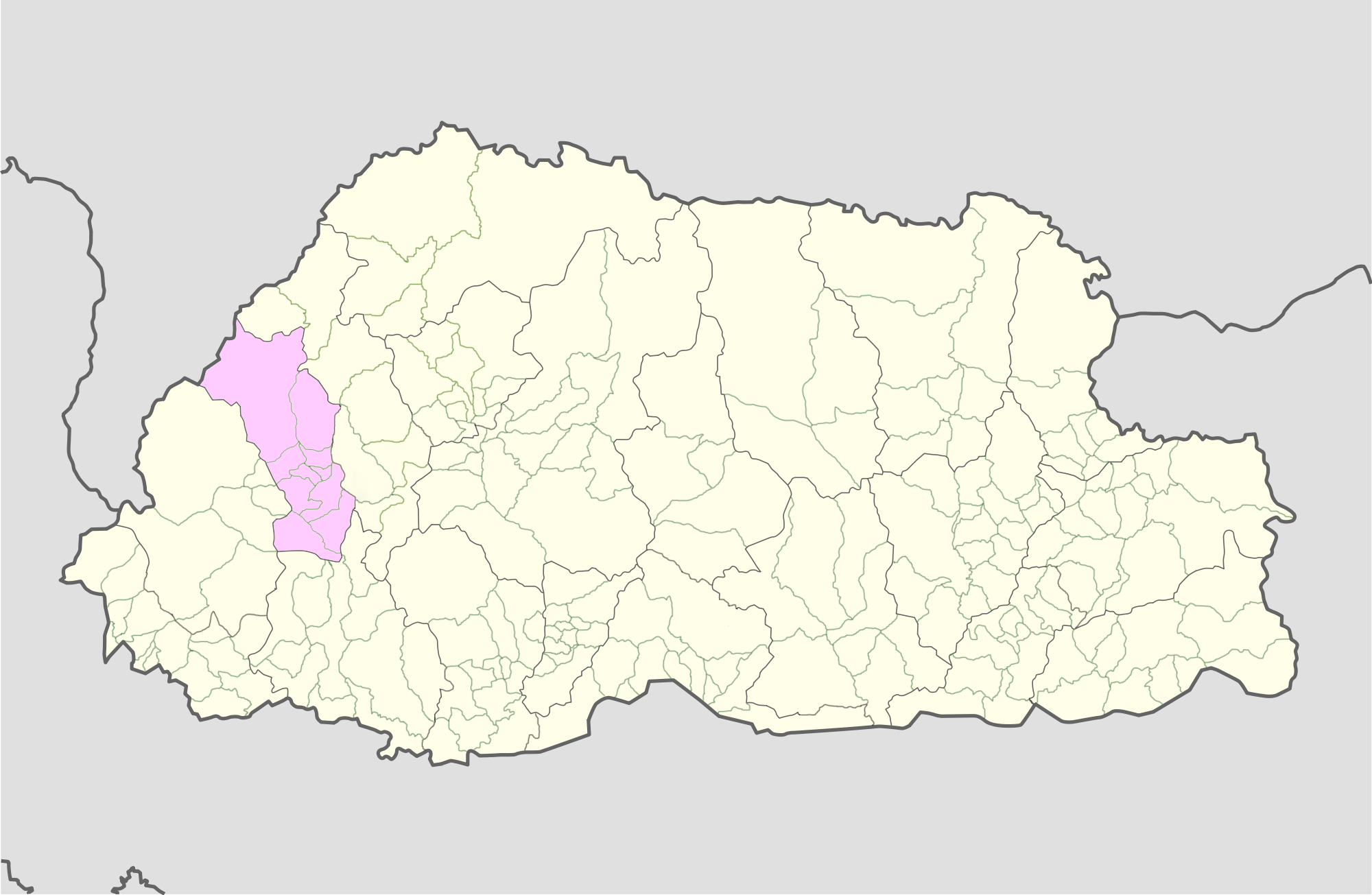
- Country: Bhutan
- District: Paro District
- Time zone: UTC+6 (BTT)

Lamgong Gewog (Dzongkha: ལམ་གོང་) is a gewog (village block) of Paro District, Bhutan. The gewog had an area of 48.8 square kilometres (18.8 sq mi) in 2002, and contained eight villages and 348 households.

One of Bhutan's oldest temple, Kyichu Lhakhang is located in this Gewog.
