= Dopshari Gewog =

Dopshari Gewog རྡོབ་ཤར་རི་
- Gewog
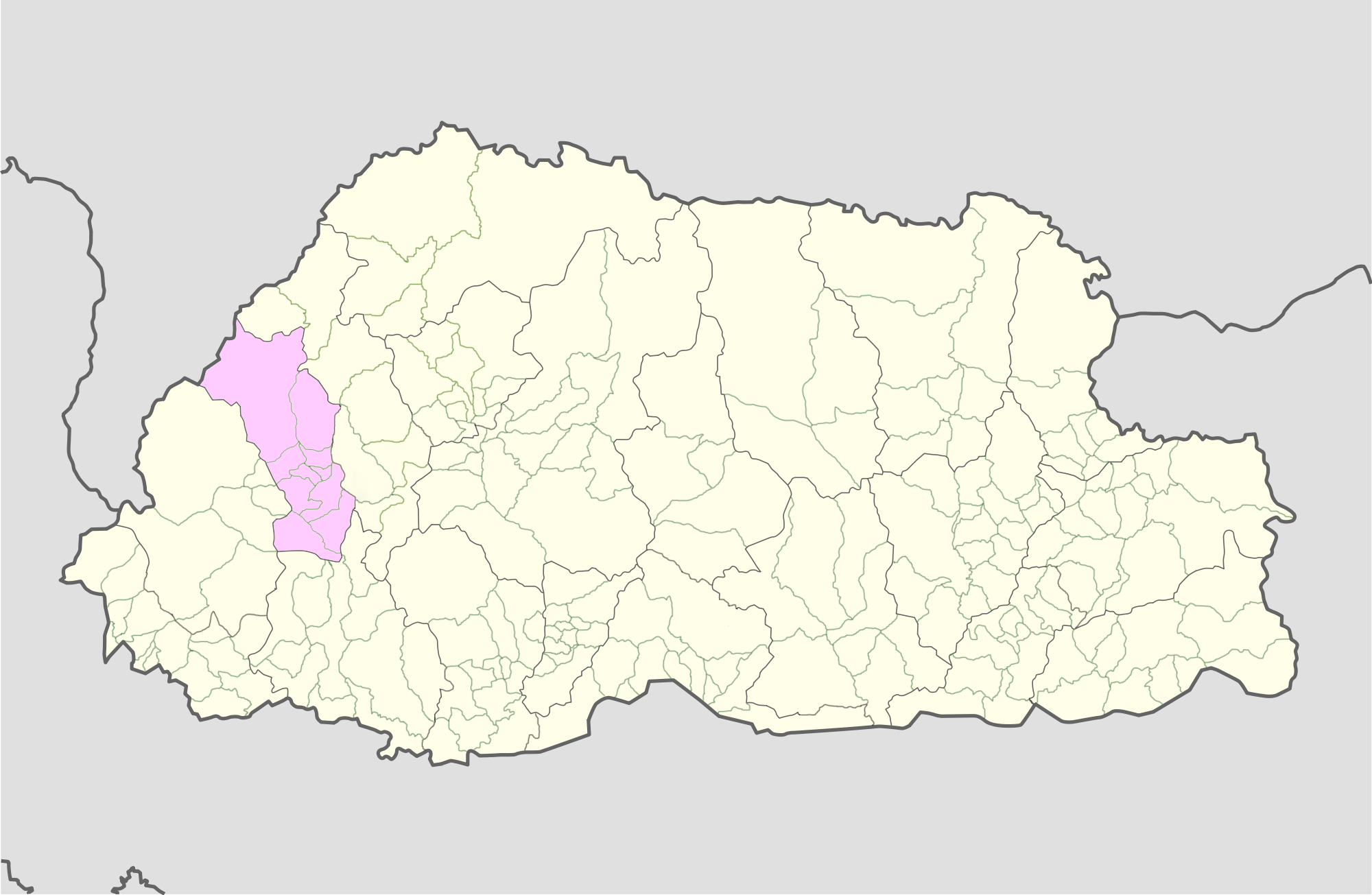
- Country: Bhutan
- District: Paro District
- Time zone: UTC+6 (BTT)

Dopshari Gewog (Dzongkha: རྡོབ་ཤར་རི་) is a gewog (village block) of Paro District, Bhutan. In 2002, the gewog had an area of 36.7 square kilometres (14.2 sq mi) and contained 24 villages and 299 households.

The current gup (local mayor) of Dop Shari council or Gewog is Tshering. He is a former tour guide and businessman. He was elected democratically by the people of Dopshari council in 2015, and his tenure is for five years.

Eighty percent of the inhabitants are farmers whose main source of income is through the sale of vegetables, apple, rice and dairy products.

Dopshari Gewog has one senior higher secondary school which enrols 600–700 students from year 9 to year 12.

Dopshari Gewog has a crime rate of less than 1%.

This gewog is located 3 km (1.9 mi) from Paro town with easy access to road and electricity.
