= Hungrel Gewog =

Hungrel Gewog ཧཱུྃ་རལ་
- Gewog
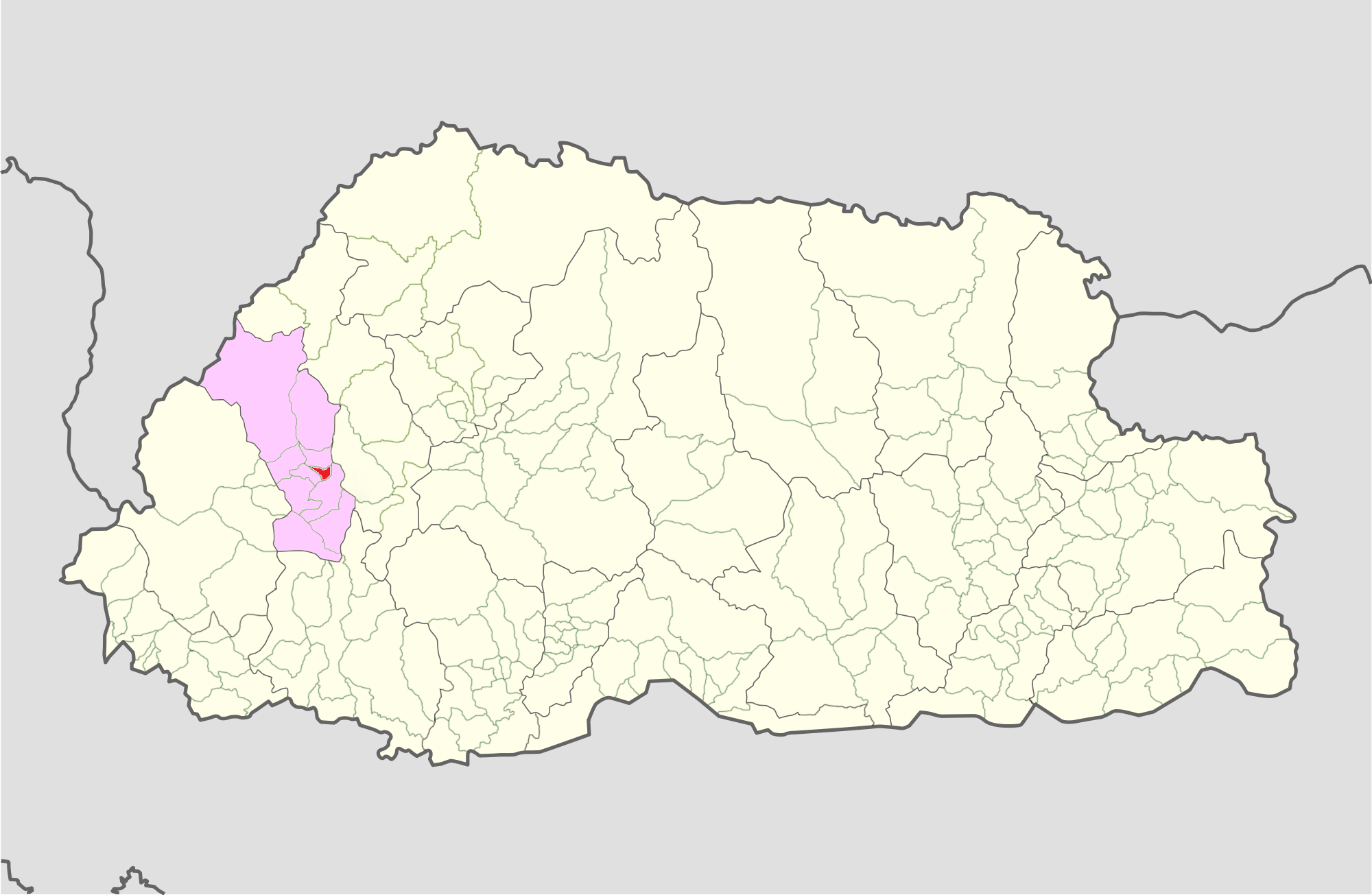
- Country: Bhutan
- District: Paro District
- Time zone: UTC+6 (BTT)

Hungrel Gewog (Dzongkha: ཧཱུྃ་རལ་) is a gewog (village block) of Paro District, Bhutan. In 2002, the gewog had an area of 3.6 square kilometres and contained 17 villages and 247 households.

== Area ==
The Gewog is divided into 5 chewogs: Gaupay Chewog, Lunhchuna Chewog, Hungrel Chewog, Jangsabu Chewog and Changsema Chewog. 78% of the households have piped drinking water facilities, and over 100 households have electricity connections. The economy is based on agriculture, mainly the dry and wetland cultivation of paddy, wheat, potatoes, apples and dairy products.
