= Dokar Gewog =

Coordinates: 27.3000°N 89.5424°E

Dokar Gewog རྡོ་དཀར་
- Gewogs
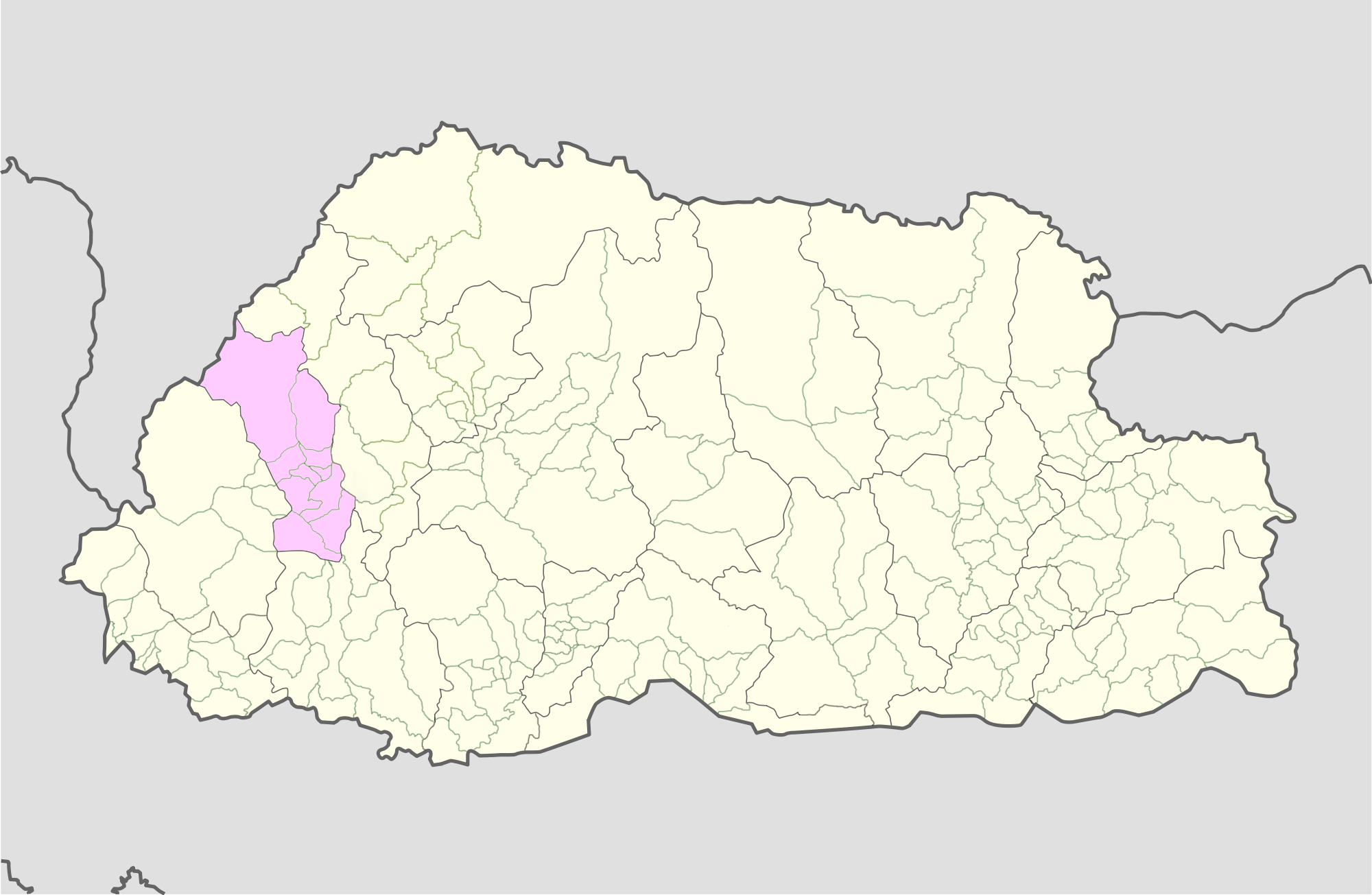
- Country: Bhutan
- District: Paro District
- Time zone: UTC+6 (BTT)

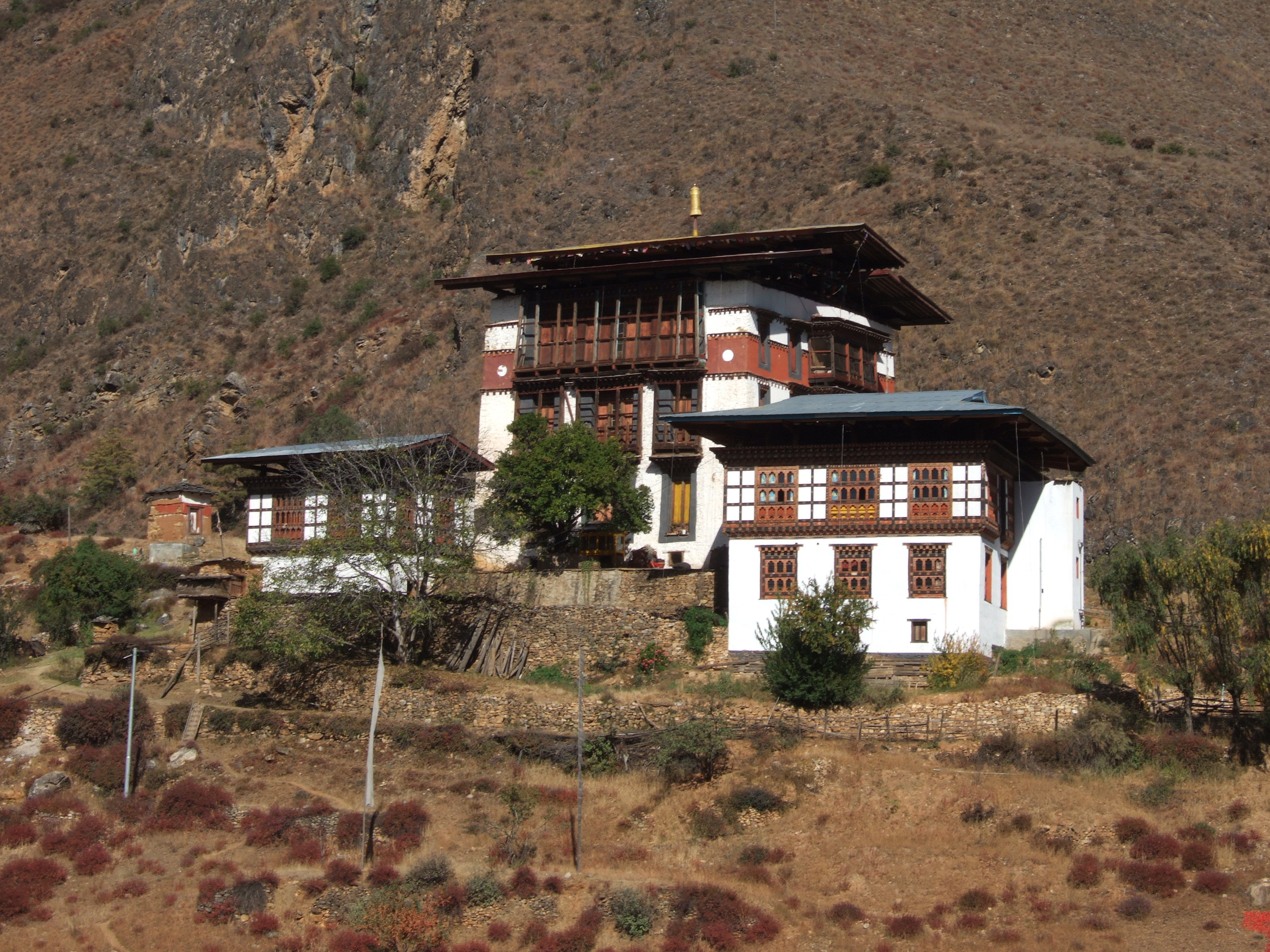
Tachog Lhakhang established by Thangtong Gyalpo

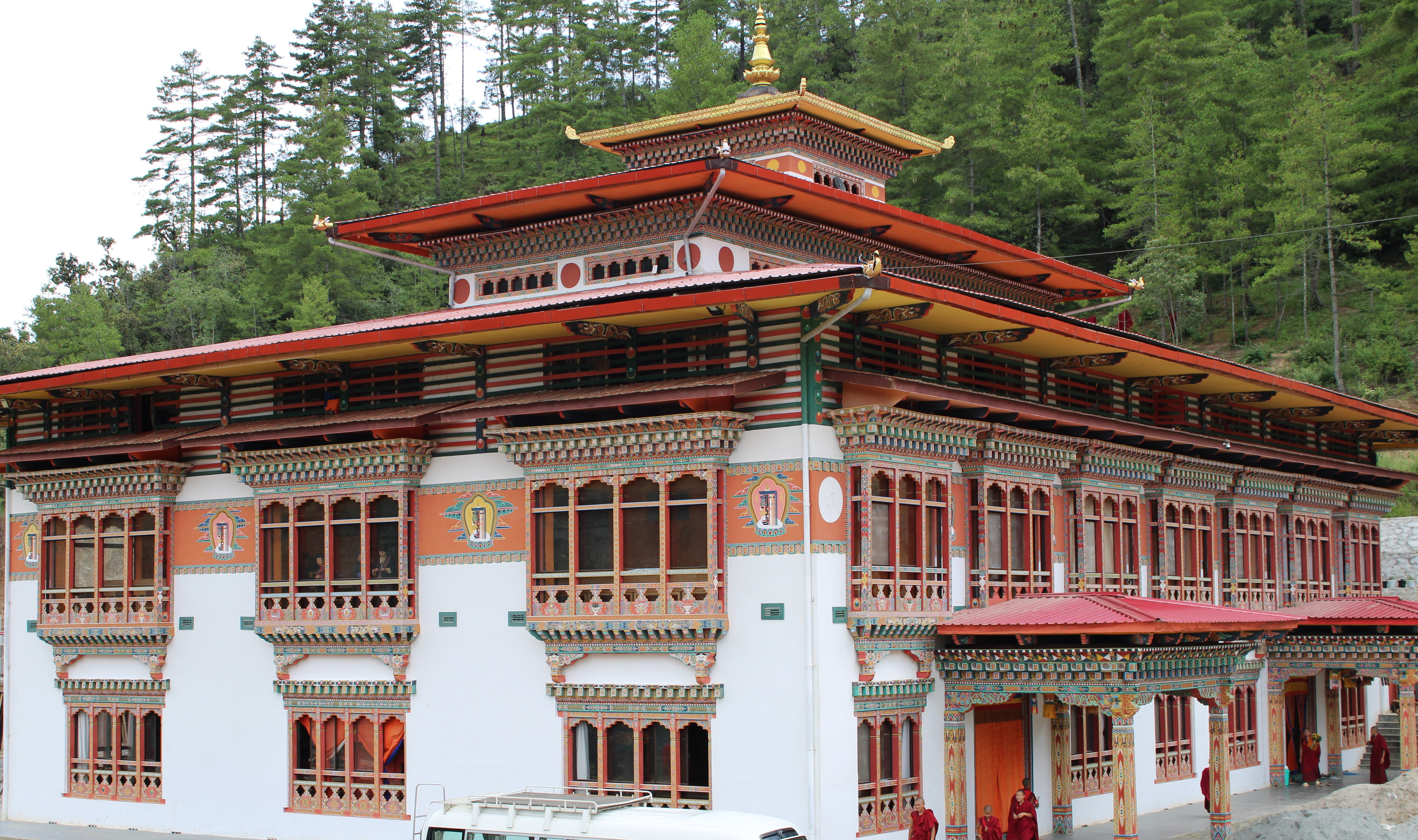
Serlung Buddhist Institute.Dzongkha:གསེར་ལུང་དགོན་པ.

Dokar Gewog (Dzongkha: རྡོ་དཀར་) is a gewog (village block) of Paro District, Bhutan. In 2002, the gewog had an area of 106.1 km^{2} (41.0 sq mi) and contained 21 villages and 327 households.

== Area ==
There are 5 Chewogs, 29 villages, and 424 households, with a population of 2,283, comprising 1099 males and 1174 females.

Dogar Gewog has a total area of 106.1 km^{2} (41.0 sq mi) of which 4,337.5 acres (17.553 km^{2}) are covered by forest and it lies in the South of the Dzongkhag.
