= Wangchang Gewog =

Wangchang Gewog ཝང་ལྕང་
- Gewog
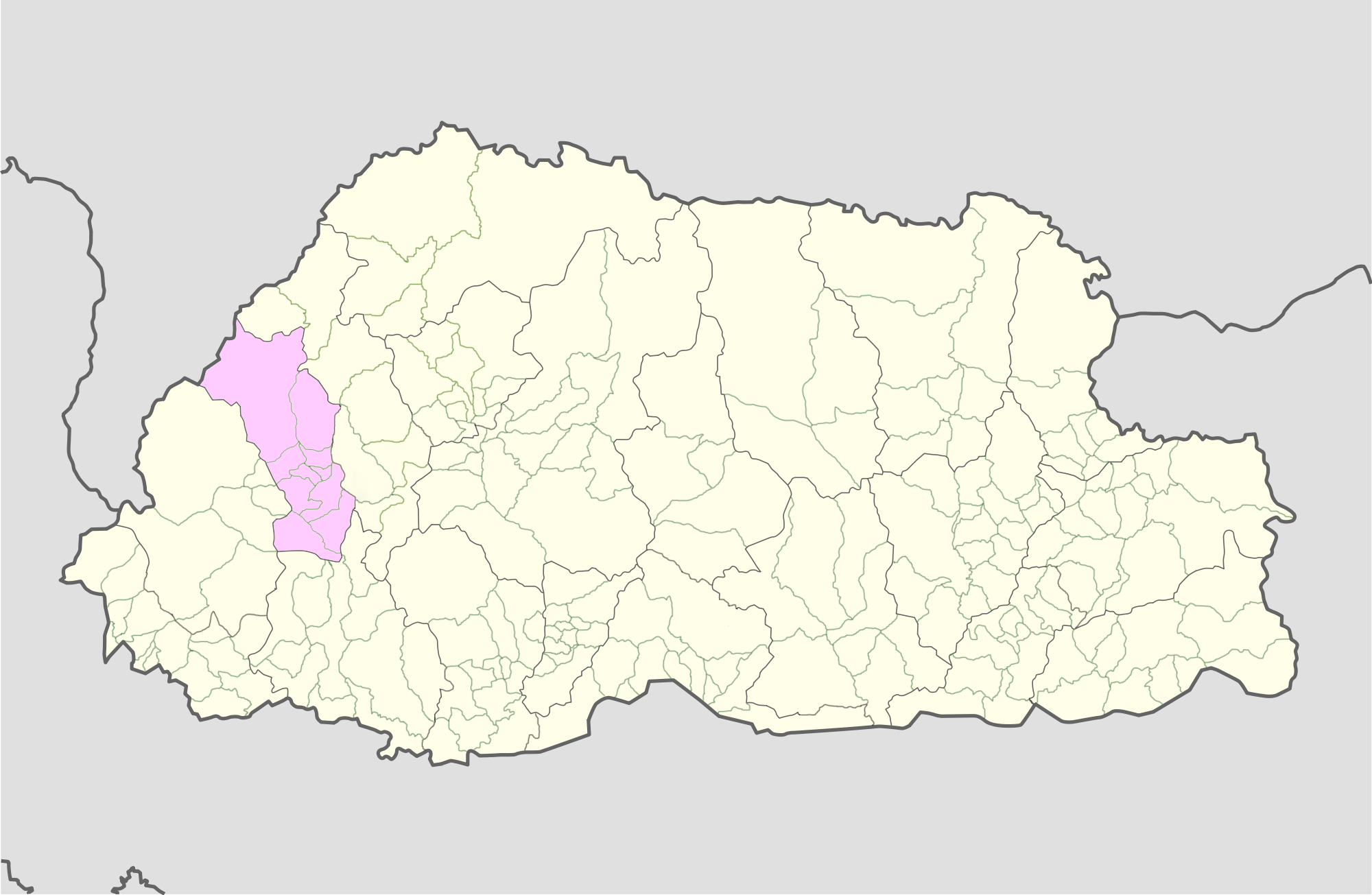
- Country: Bhutan
- District: Paro District
- Time zone: UTC+6 (BTT)

Wangchang Gewog (Dzongkha: ཝང་ལྕང་) is a gewog (village block) of Paro District, Bhutan. In 2002, the gewog had an area of 34.2 square kilometres and contained 7 chewogs and 278 households.
