= Doteng Gewog =

Doteng Gewog རྡོ་སྟེང་
- Gewogs
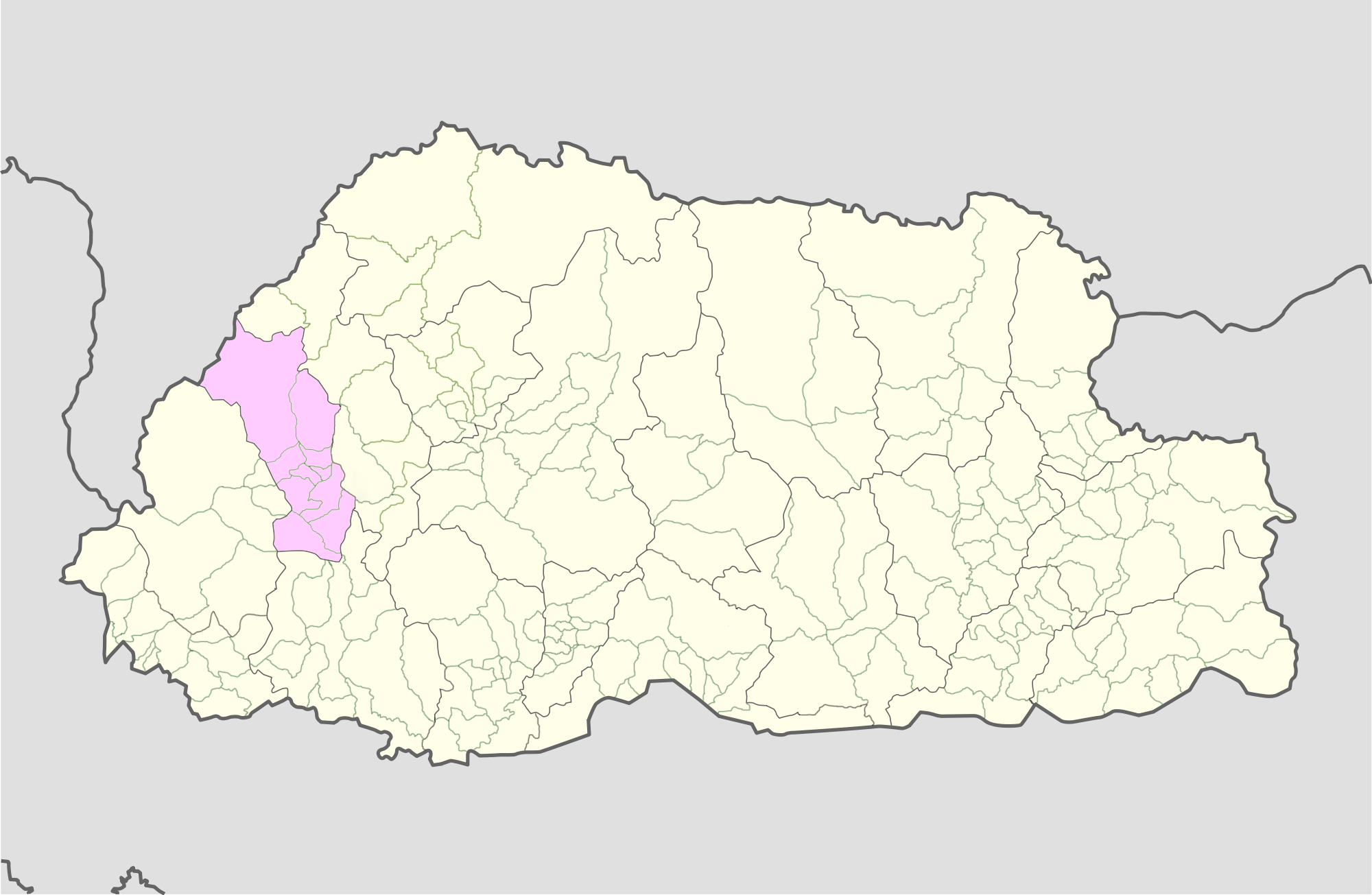
- Country: Bhutan
- District: Paro District
- Time zone: UTC+6 (BTT)

Doteng Gewog (Dzongkha: རྡོ་སྟེང་) is a gewog (village block) of Paro District, Bhutan. In 2002, the gewog had an area of 193.1 square kilometres and contained eight villages and 143 households.
