= Naja Gewog =

Naja Gewog ན་རྒྱ་
- Gewogs
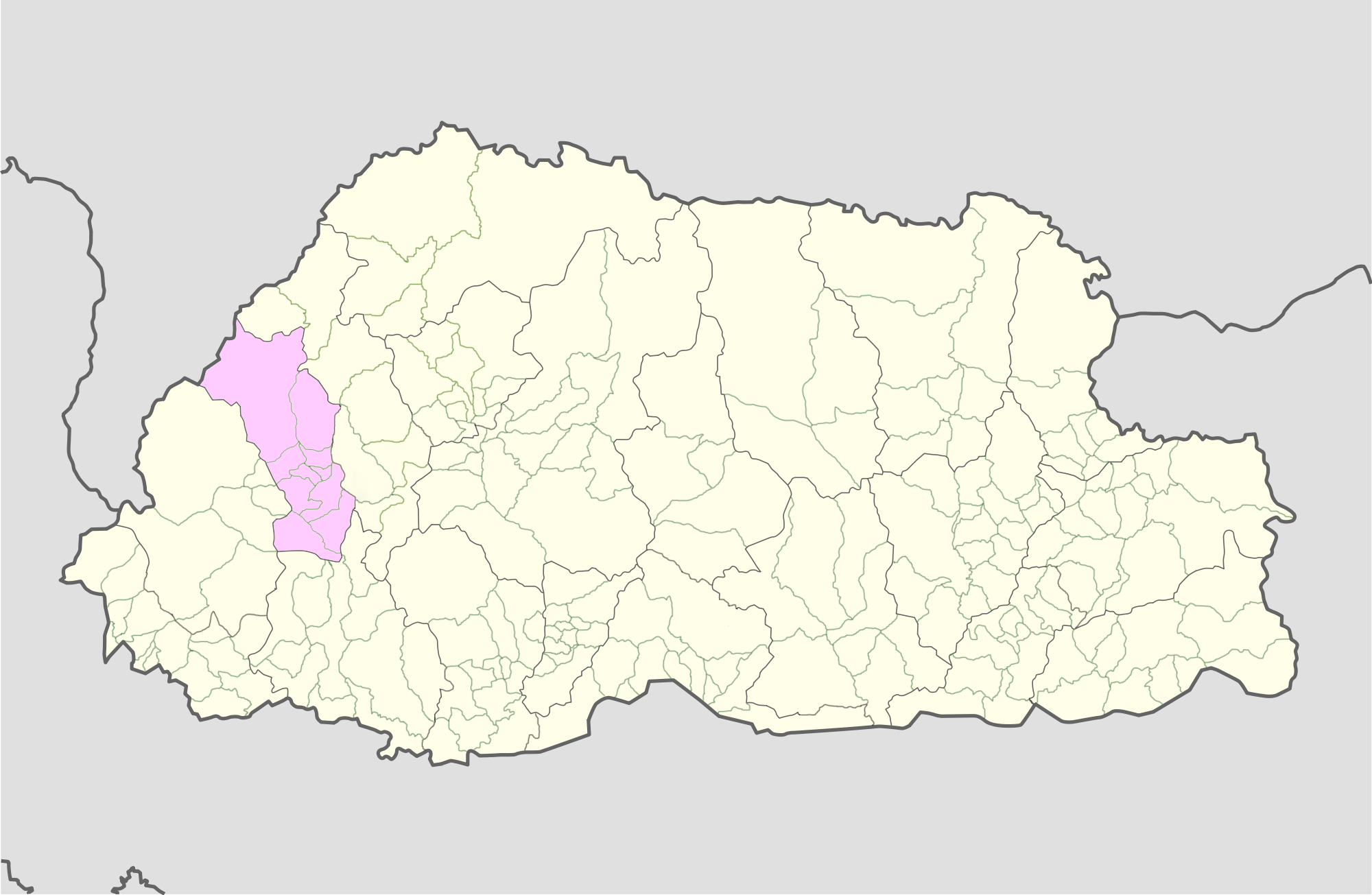
- Country: Bhutan
- District: Paro District
- Time zone: UTC+6 (BTT)

Naja Gewog (Dzongkha: ན་རྒྱ་) is a gewog (village block) of Paro District, Bhutan. In 2002, the gewog had an area of 151.8 square kilometres and contained 13 villages and 355 households.
