= Lungnyi Gewog =

Lungnyi Gewog ལུང་གཉིས་
- Gewog
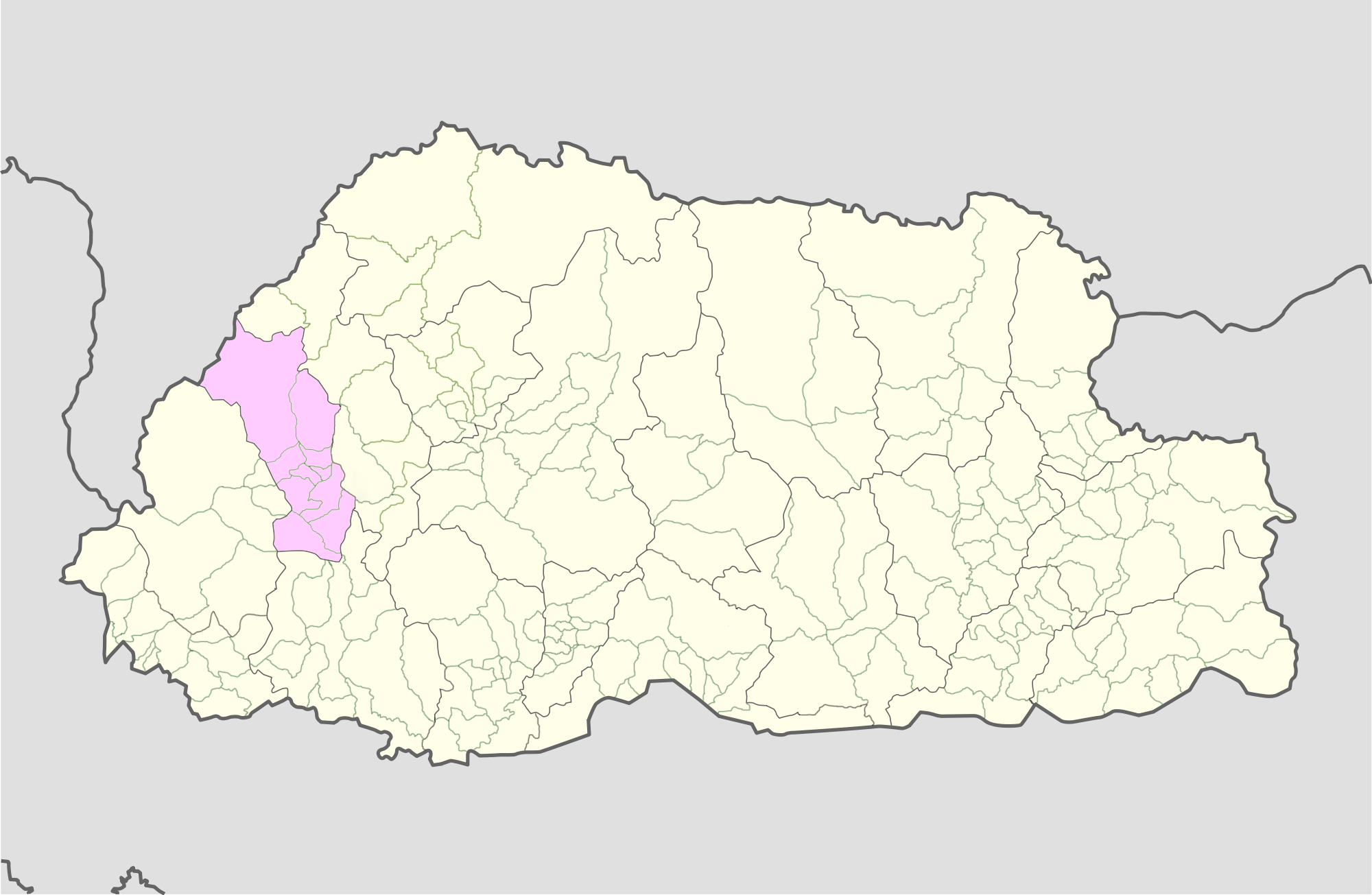
- Country: Bhutan
- District: Paro District
- Time zone: UTC+6 (BTT)

Lungnyi Gewog (Dzongkha: ལུང་གཉིས་) is a gewog (village block) of Paro District, Bhutan.

== Area ==
In 2002, the gewog had an area of 59.7 square kilometres and contained seven villages and 265 households.

== Notable places ==
A popular medicinal spring water blessed by Lama Drukpa Kunley known as Bjagay Menchu in Paro which heals fractured bones and arthritis is located in Jieu Dado of Lungnyi Gewog.
