= Miyolangsangma =

Tibetan Buddhist goddess

Miyolangsangma is the Tibetan Buddhist goddess who lives at the top of Chomolungma (Mount Everest). She is one of the five long-life sisters and her virtue is inexhaustible giving. She started out as a malevolent demoness and was converted by a great Buddhist. Now, she is the goddess of inexhaustible giving and of Everest and the Khumbu area in general. She rides a golden tigress and hands out the jewels of wishes to those deserving. Many climbers of Chomolungma beseech her favor at the traditional stupa in which a Buddhist monk prays for them and they go through certain ceremonies.

It is said that Tenzing Norgay followed her up Everest and that she allowed him to be the first to summit Everest.
