= Paro District =

District of Bhutan

Paro District སྤ་རོ་རྫོང་ཁག།
- District
- Location of Paro district within Bhutan
- Coordinates: 27°30′N 89°20′E
- Country: Bhutan
- Headquarters: Paro

Area
  - Total: 1,293 km^{2} (499 sq mi)

Population (2017)
  - Total: 46,316
  - Density: 35.82/km^{2} (92.77/sq mi)
- Time zone: UTC+6 (BTT)
- ISO 3166 code: BT-11
- HDI (2019): 0.722 high · 2nd
- Website: www.paro.gov.bt

Paro District (Dzongkha: སྤ་རོ་རྫོང་ཁག།; Wylie: Spa-ro rdzong-khag) is a district (dzongkhag), valley, river and town (population 20,000) in Bhutan. It is one of the most historic valleys in Bhutan. Both trade goods and invading Tibetans came over the pass at the head of the valley, giving Paro the closest cultural connection with Tibet of any Bhutanese district. The dominant language in Paro is Dzongkha, the national language.

The only international airport in Bhutan, Paro International Airport, is located in Paro District.

== Geography ==
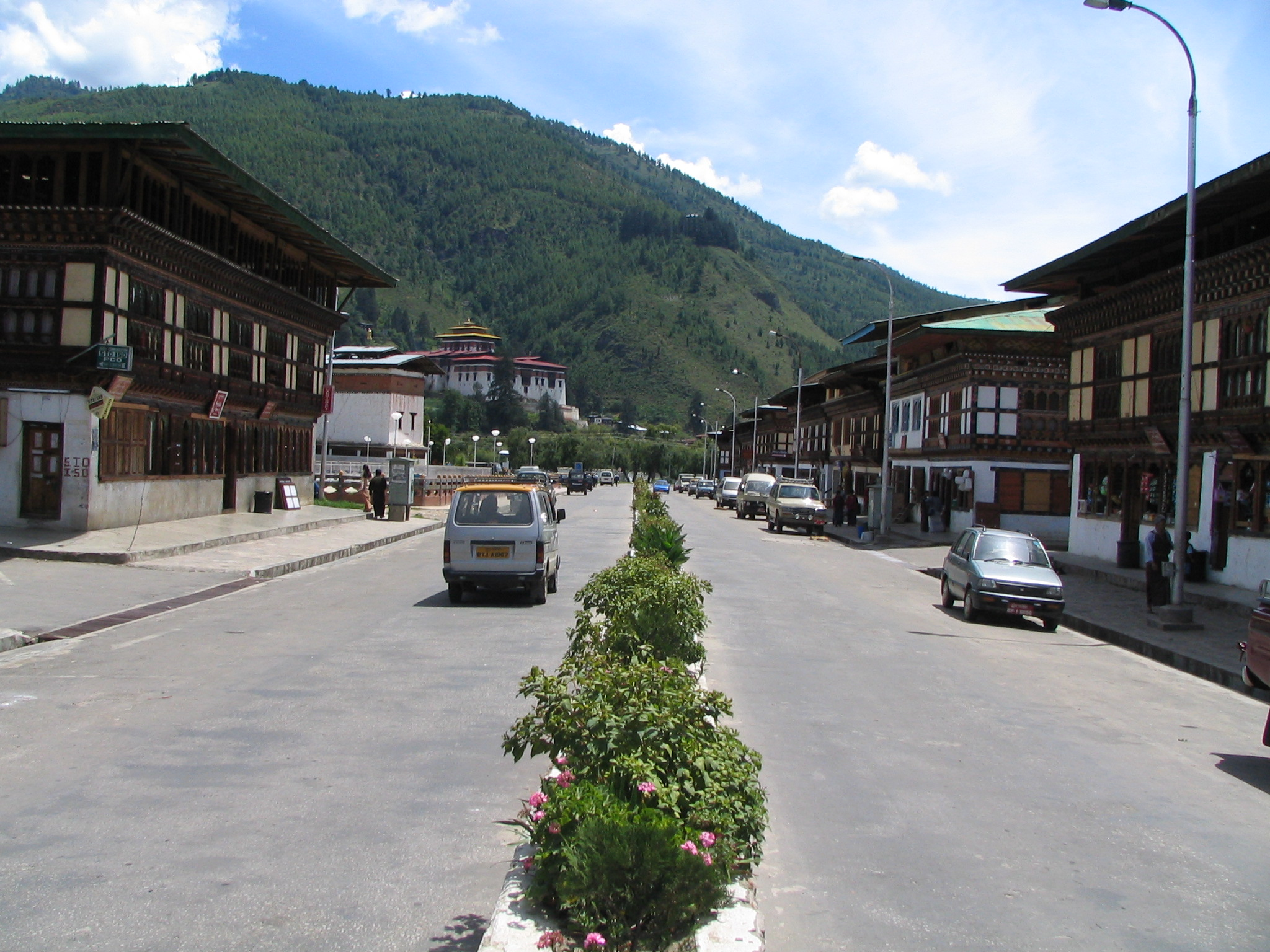
Town of Paro and Paro Dzong (September 2006)

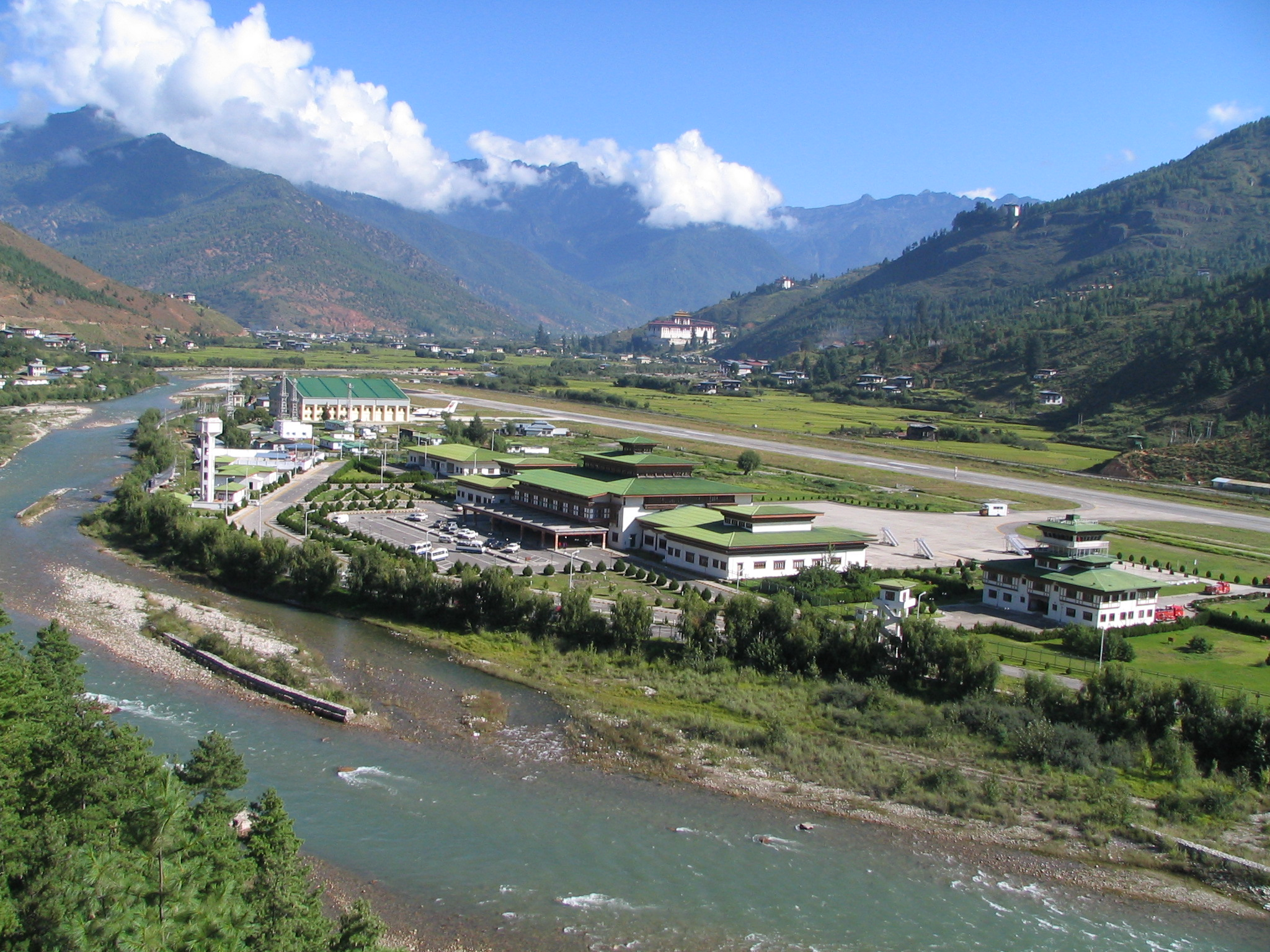
Paro Airport

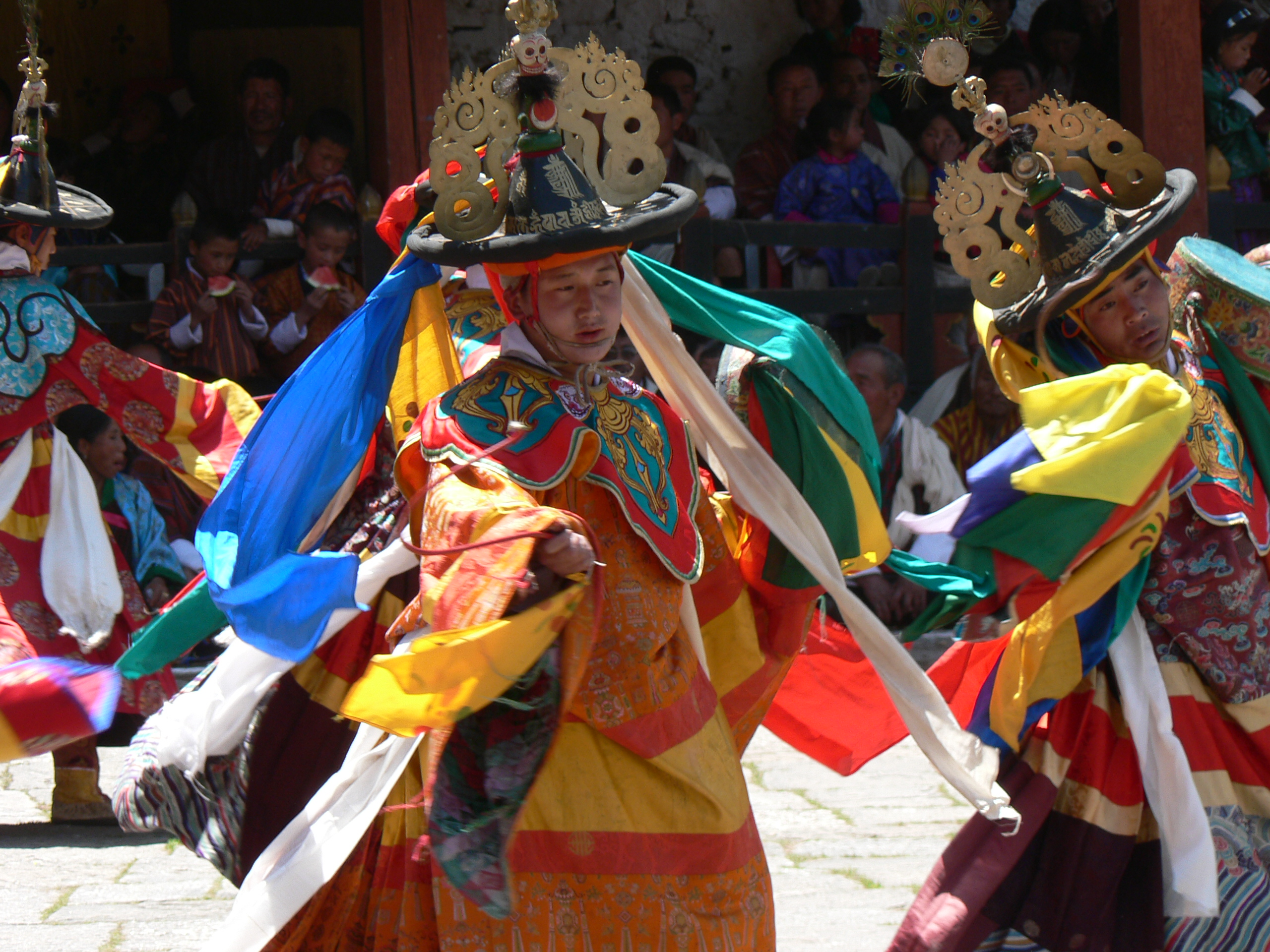
Dance of the Black Hats at Paro Tsechu

Paro District is bordered by Haa district to the west, Tibet to the north, Thimphu district to the east, and Chukha district to the south.

== Administrative divisions ==
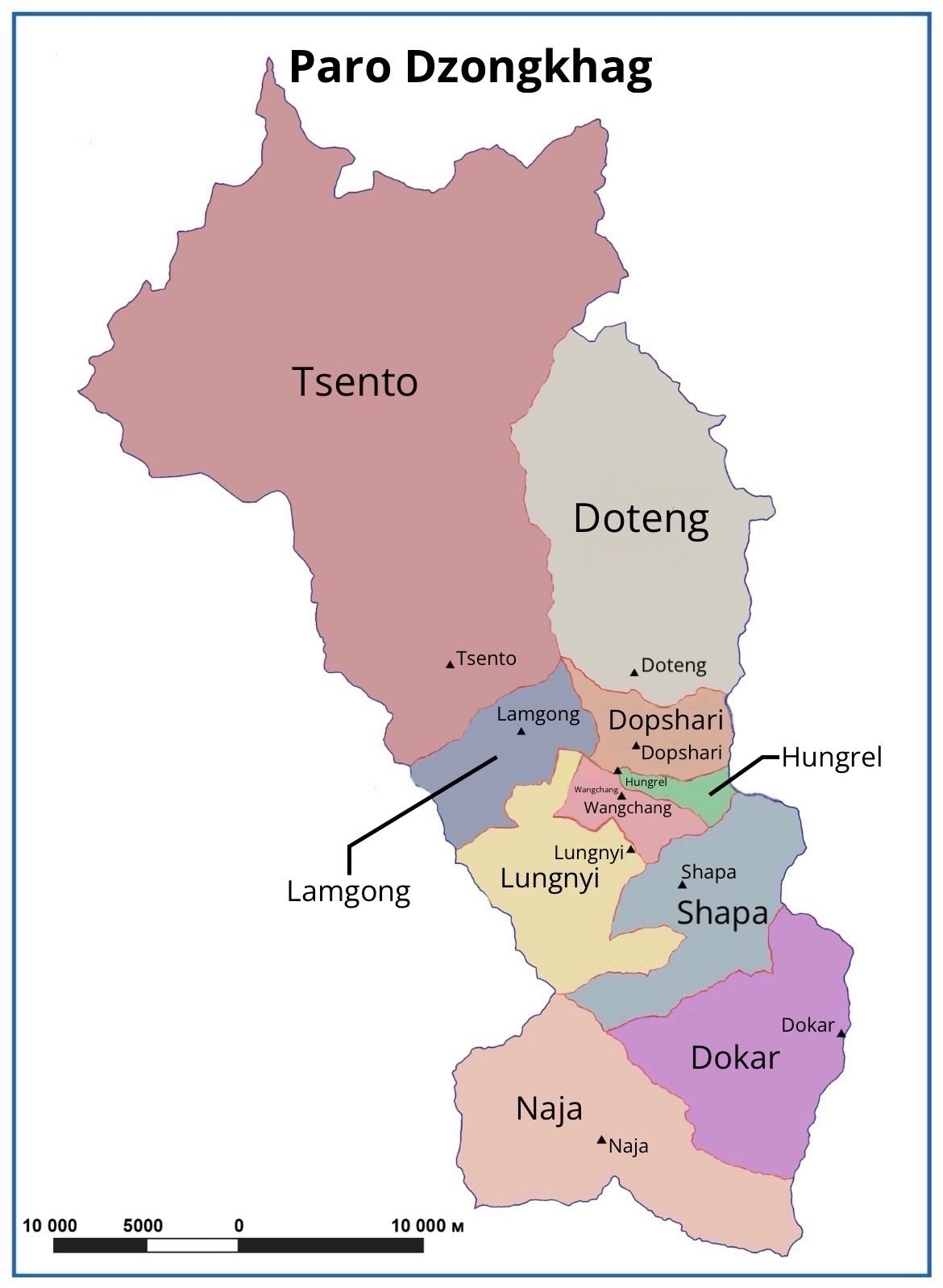
Map of Gewogs of Paro Dzongkhag

Paro District consists of ten village blocks (or gewogs):

- Dokar Gewog
- Dopshari Gewog
- Doteng Gewog
- Hungrel Gewog
- Lamgong Gewog
- Lungnyi Gewog
- Naja Gewog
- Shapa Gewog
- Tsento Gewog
- Wangchang Gewog

== Environment ==
Northern Paro District (the gewogs of Doteng and Tsento) contains part of Jigme Dorji National Park and the biological corridor connecting it to Torsa Strict Nature Reserve in neighboring Haa District.

A spiritual treasure lake known as Drakey Pangtsho said to be on the lap of Jowo Drake where Guru Rinpoche had hidden sacred treasures is in paro.

== Cultural sites ==
Important cultural sites of Paro include:

- Taktshang, or Tiger's Nest, the most famous monastery and ancient highlights for the people of Bhutan. It was founded as a meditating cave by the famous saint Guru Padmasambhava in the early 8th century upon subjugating a demon and forcing him to take an oath to be the local protector of the region towards the very end.
- Kyichu Lhakhang, which along with Jambay Lhakhang in central Bhutan is the oldest temple in Bhutan, dating to the 7th century.
- Drukgyel Dzong, at the upper end of the valley, built to protect against invading Tibetans, but in ruins since a fire in the 1950s.
- Paro Town, the single market town in the dzonghag which is booming (by Bhutanese standards) due to an influx of tourist dollars.
- Rinpung Dzong, also known as Paro Dzong, the massive fortress/monastery which is also the administrative center of the dzonkhag. Scenes from the movie Little Buddha were filmed in and around this dzong.
- The National Museum of Bhutan, where visitors can learn about the culture of Bhutan.
- Dzongdrakha Goenpa is a sacred cliff of Guru Rinpoche above the two villages of Bonday and Gyepjag under Paro Dzongkhag blessed during his second visit to Bhutan in 822 A.D from Tibet.
- Chumophu Ney is a meditation place of Guru Rinpoche in Paro where the famous floating statue of Dorji Phagmo is defying gravity.
- Drakarpo is a sacred cliff that Guru Rinpoche broke and took out an evil spirit in the 8th century. This holy cliff, also known as the mini-Taktsang.
- Ragoey Ney is a sacred site blessed by Guru Rinpoche in the 8th century. The monastery houses a Guru Sungjoen Statue brought by a goat and a vulture from Punakha.
- Gom Drak is one of the Four Cliffs of Guru Rinpoche entrusted to Phajo Drugom Zhigpo in his prophetic vision.
- Jomolhari is a sacred mountain where a meditation cave of Guru Rinpoche and Khandro Yeshe Tsogyal meditated before flying back to Tibet.
- Namthong Karpo is a sacred cave where Guru Rinpoche meditated and subdued a sickle-faced demon.
- Bumdrak monastery is a sacred cliff of Guru Rinpoche where Goddess of the Fairies left 100,000 footprints.
- Hungrel Dzong is a fortress built on the sacred site of Guru Rinpoche by Drung Drung Gyelchog in the 15th century. It was a five-story structure, built of compact mud, and resembled Namgyal Khangzang.

== Economy ==
Druk Air, the national airline of Bhutan, has its headquarters in Paro.

== Climate ==
Climate data for Paro, elevation 2,406 m (7,894 ft), (1996–2017 normals)
Month	Jan	Feb	Mar	Apr	May	Jun	Jul	Aug	Sep	Oct	Nov	Dec	Year
Record high °C (°F)	25.0 (77.0)	24.5 (76.1)	28.0 (82.4)	29.0 (84.2)	31.0 (87.8)	30.0 (86.0)	31.0 (87.8)	32.0 (89.6)	30.0 (86.0)	27.0 (80.6)	26.0 (78.8)	23.0 (73.4)	32.0 (89.6)
Mean daily maximum °C (°F)	13.2 (55.8)	15.0 (59.0)	17.9 (64.2)	20.6 (69.1)	22.7 (72.9)	24.6 (76.3)	25.0 (77.0)	24.9 (76.8)	23.3 (73.9)	20.7 (69.3)	16.9 (62.4)	14.6 (58.3)	20.0 (67.9)
Daily mean °C (°F)	6.2 (43.2)	8.2 (46.8)	11.1 (52.0)	14.2 (57.6)	17.0 (62.6)	19.6 (67.3)	20.6 (69.1)	20.3 (68.5)	18.8 (65.8)	15.0 (59.0)	10.8 (51.4)	7.6 (45.7)	14.1 (57.4)
Mean daily minimum °C (°F)	−0.9 (30.4)	1.3 (34.3)	4.3 (39.7)	7.8 (46.0)	11.2 (52.2)	14.5 (58.1)	16.1 (61.0)	15.7 (60.3)	14.2 (57.6)	9.3 (48.7)	4.7 (40.5)	0.5 (32.9)	8.2 (46.8)
Record low °C (°F)	−9.0 (15.8)	−6.5 (20.3)	−4.0 (24.8)	0.0 (32.0)	2.0 (35.6)	5.8 (42.4)	11.0 (51.8)	10.0 (50.0)	6.0 (42.8)	0.0 (32.0)	−5.0 (23.0)	−9.0 (15.8)	−9.0 (15.8)
Average rainfall mm (inches)	7.1 (0.28)	13.0 (0.51)	22.2 (0.87)	33.8 (1.33)	58.7 (2.31)	80.9 (3.19)	161.2 (6.35)	112.7 (4.44)	87.9 (3.46)	48.8 (1.92)	1.5 (0.06)	2.9 (0.11)	630.7 (24.83)
Average rainy days	0.7	2.1	3.7	6.4	9.7	12.5	18.5	17.4	13.3	4.3	0.2	0.5	89.3
Average relative humidity (%)	69.8	67.7	65.6	66.5	67.6	70.6	77.4	76.7	76.5	70.0	66.7	69.0	70.3
Source 1: National Center for Hydrology and Meteorology
Source 2: World Meteorological Organization (rainy days 1996–2018)

Climate data for Betikha, Paro district, elevation 2,660 m (8,730 ft), (1996–2017 normals)
Month	Jan	Feb	Mar	Apr	May	Jun	Jul	Aug	Sep	Oct	Nov	Dec	Year
Mean daily maximum °C (°F)	10.8 (51.4)	11.4 (52.5)	13.8 (56.8)	15.8 (60.4)	17.7 (63.9)	19.7 (67.5)	20.3 (68.5)	20.5 (68.9)	19.7 (67.5)	17.7 (63.9)	14.9 (58.8)	12.5 (54.5)	16.2 (61.2)
Daily mean °C (°F)	5.1 (41.2)	5.5 (41.9)	8.4 (47.1)	11.1 (52.0)	13.4 (56.1)	16.0 (60.8)	17.0 (62.6)	17.0 (62.6)	15.7 (60.3)	12.6 (54.7)	9.2 (48.6)	6.6 (43.9)	11.5 (52.7)
Mean daily minimum °C (°F)	−0.7 (30.7)	−0.5 (31.1)	3.0 (37.4)	6.3 (43.3)	9.1 (48.4)	12.2 (54.0)	13.7 (56.7)	13.4 (56.1)	11.7 (53.1)	7.5 (45.5)	3.4 (38.1)	0.7 (33.3)	6.7 (44.0)
Average rainfall mm (inches)	18.0 (0.71)	32.7 (1.29)	175.8 (6.92)	344.2 (13.55)	295.3 (11.63)	356.7 (14.04)	552.8 (21.76)	421.8 (16.61)	254.4 (10.02)	102.0 (4.02)	12.0 (0.47)	6.6 (0.26)	2,572.3 (101.28)
Average relative humidity (%)	70.6	70.3	74.2	74.8	76.3	82.2	84.3	83.9	82.4	77.7	72.0	66.6	76.3
Source: National Center for Hydrology and Meteorology

Climate data for Drukyel, Paro District, elevation 2,547 m (8,356 ft), (1996–2017 normals)
Month	Jan	Feb	Mar	Apr	May	Jun	Jul	Aug	Sep	Oct	Nov	Dec	Year
Mean daily maximum °C (°F)	13.1 (55.6)	14.8 (58.6)	17.4 (63.3)	19.5 (67.1)	21.9 (71.4)	23.8 (74.8)	24.0 (75.2)	24.1 (75.4)	22.4 (72.3)	20.0 (68.0)	17.4 (63.3)	13.8 (56.8)	19.4 (66.8)
Daily mean °C (°F)	5.2 (41.4)	7.1 (44.8)	10.1 (50.2)	12.9 (55.2)	15.9 (60.6)	19.1 (66.4)	19.6 (67.3)	19.6 (67.3)	17.8 (64.0)	13.9 (57.0)	10.0 (50.0)	6.0 (42.8)	13.1 (55.6)
Mean daily minimum °C (°F)	−2.7 (27.1)	−0.6 (30.9)	2.8 (37.0)	6.2 (43.2)	9.8 (49.6)	14.3 (57.7)	15.2 (59.4)	15.0 (59.0)	13.1 (55.6)	7.8 (46.0)	2.6 (36.7)	−1.8 (28.8)	6.8 (44.3)
Average rainfall mm (inches)	0.5 (0.02)	3.0 (0.12)	13.6 (0.54)	38.6 (1.52)	72.6 (2.86)	134.4 (5.29)	228.9 (9.01)	256.3 (10.09)	127.0 (5.00)	76.8 (3.02)	2.2 (0.09)	0.5 (0.02)	954.4 (37.58)
Average relative humidity (%)	70.7	72.4	73.4	71.2	74.2	80.1	84.5	83.7	82.1	78.2	72.7	70.0	76.1
Source: National Center for Hydrology and Meteorology

== See also ==
- Damthang
- Districts of Bhutan
- Paro Province
