= Kyichu Lhakhang =

Buddhist temple in Paro, Bhutan

Coordinates: 27°26′28″N 89°22′32″E

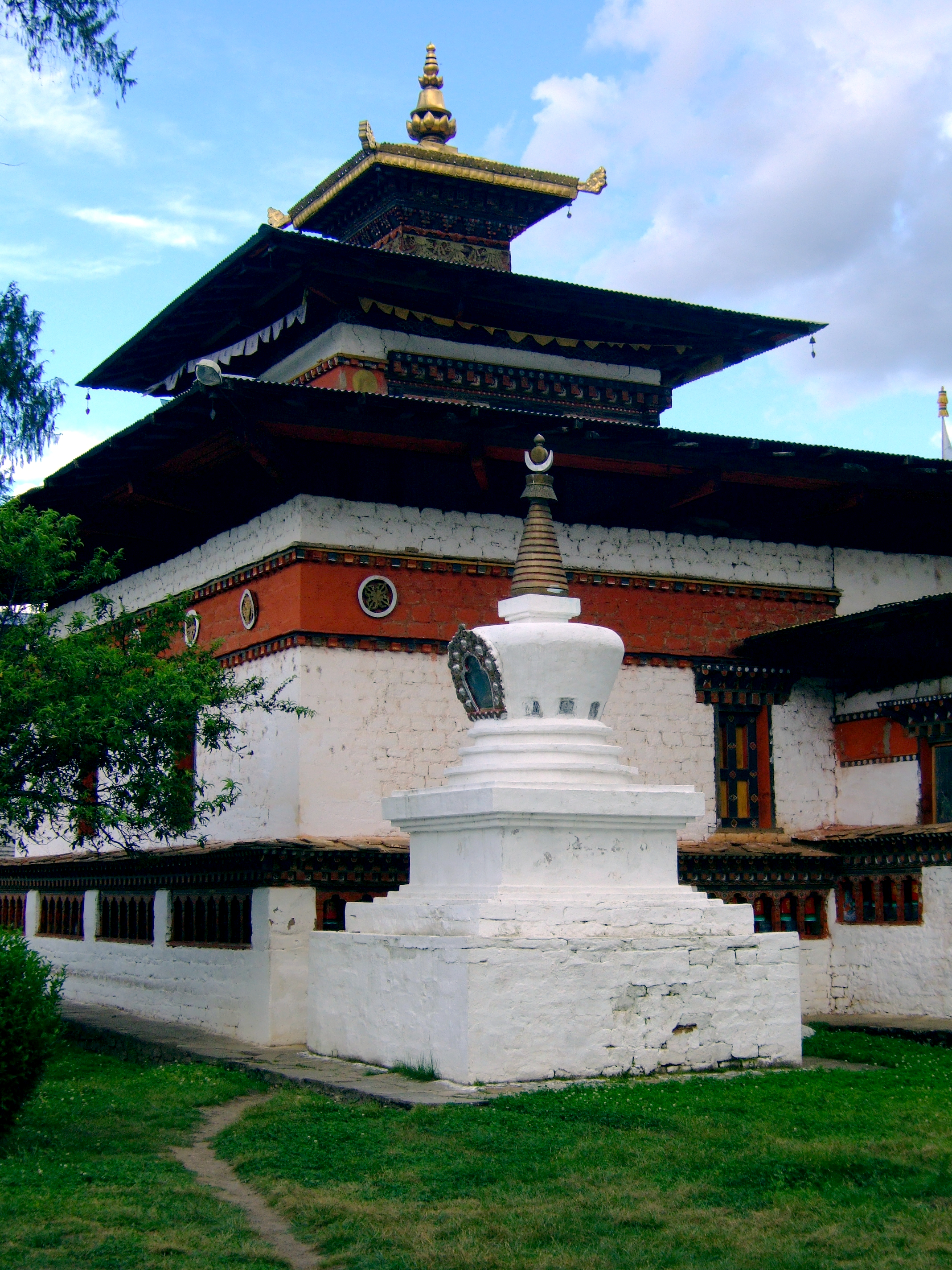
- Kyichu Lhakhang

Religion
- Affiliation: Tibetan Buddhism
- Festival: Kichu Zangchoe Moenlam

Location
- Location: Paro Dzongkhag
- Country: Bhutan
- Interactive map of Kyichu Lhakhang

Architecture
- Style: Dzong
- Founder: Emperor Songtsen Gampo
- Established: 659; 1367 years ago

Kyichu Lhakhang, (also known as Kyerchu Temple or Lho Kyerchu) is an important Himalayan Buddhist temple situated in Lango Gewog of Paro Dzongkhag in Bhutan.

== History ==
The Jowo Temple of Kyichu is one of the oldest temples in Bhutan, originally built in the 7th century by the Tibetan Emperor Songtsen Gampo, the 33rd King of the Yarlung dynasty, who ruled Tibet for much of the first millennium. The temple is considered to be one of the 108 border taming temples he built. In the 8th century, the temple was visited by Padmasambhava and it is believed he concealed many spiritual treasures here. Je Khenpo Sherab Gyaltshen wrote that during the 12th century the temple was looked after by the Lhapa Kagyu tradition and that during the 13th century it was handed over to a descendant of Phajo Drugom Zhigpo's son Nyima. In his The Nyingma School of Tibetan Buddhism: Its Fundamentals and History, Jigdral Yeshe Dorje (2nd Dudjom Rinpoche) records that the Jowo Temple of Kyichu could not be seen and that Pema Lingpa (1450–1521) uncovered the temple and restored it as it was before. In 1644, the temple was taken over by Ngawang Namgyal. From 1836 to 1838, the temple was restored and re-consecrated by the 25th Je Khenpo Sherab Gyaltshen. In 1971, Kesang Choden Wangchuck, the queen of Jigme Dorji Wangchuck built a Guru Temple next to the old Jowo Temple which was consecrated by Dilgo Khyentse. Ever since then the annual rites of great accomplishment for the deities Vajrasattva, Palchen Heruka, and Vajrakilaya have been held in this temple for the well-being of the country under the patronage of Kesang Choden Wangchuck. There is a belief that the two orange trees in the courtyard of Kyichu Lhakhang bear fruit throughout the year.

== Purpose ==
The lhakhang was built to subdue a demoness (Sin Mo) and all of the 108 temples were said to have been built on the same day to subjugate her and ensure the propagation of Buddhism. It is located north of Paro about five minute's drive from town. The story of the foundation of these temples by the Tibetan King is so well known to the Bhutanese that, according to historian Karma Phuntsho, Bhutan's history effectively begins with this event. Kyichu Lhakhang is believed to have been a smaller structure when the Tibetan King Songtsen Gampo erected this sacred building in the year 659, but a number of Buddhist saints and gurus added to the site until it became the spectacular temple it is today. Kyichu Lhakhang is situated between Tenchen Choeling nunnery, Taktsang and Sangchoekhor.

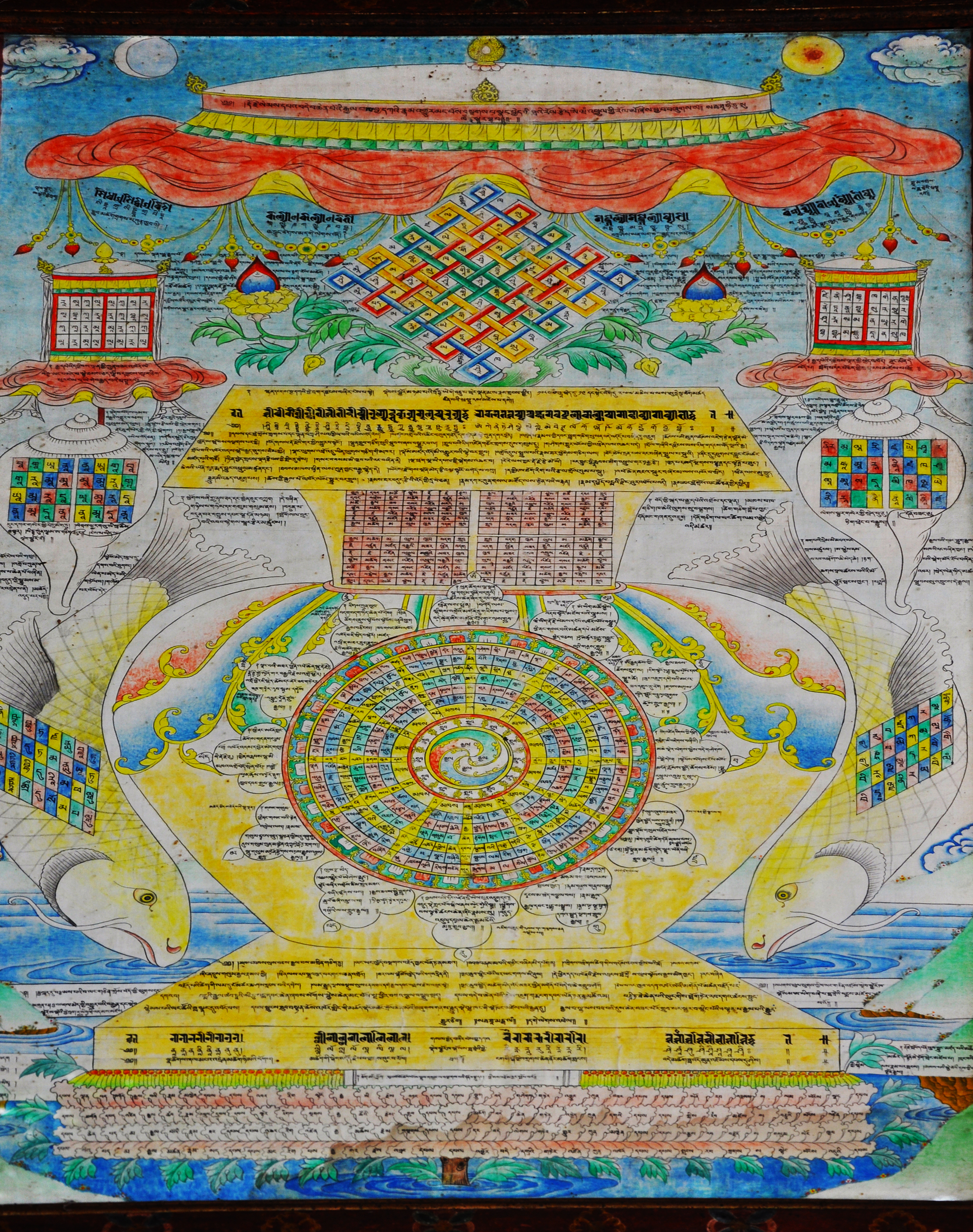
Painting on the wall of Kyichu Lhakhang

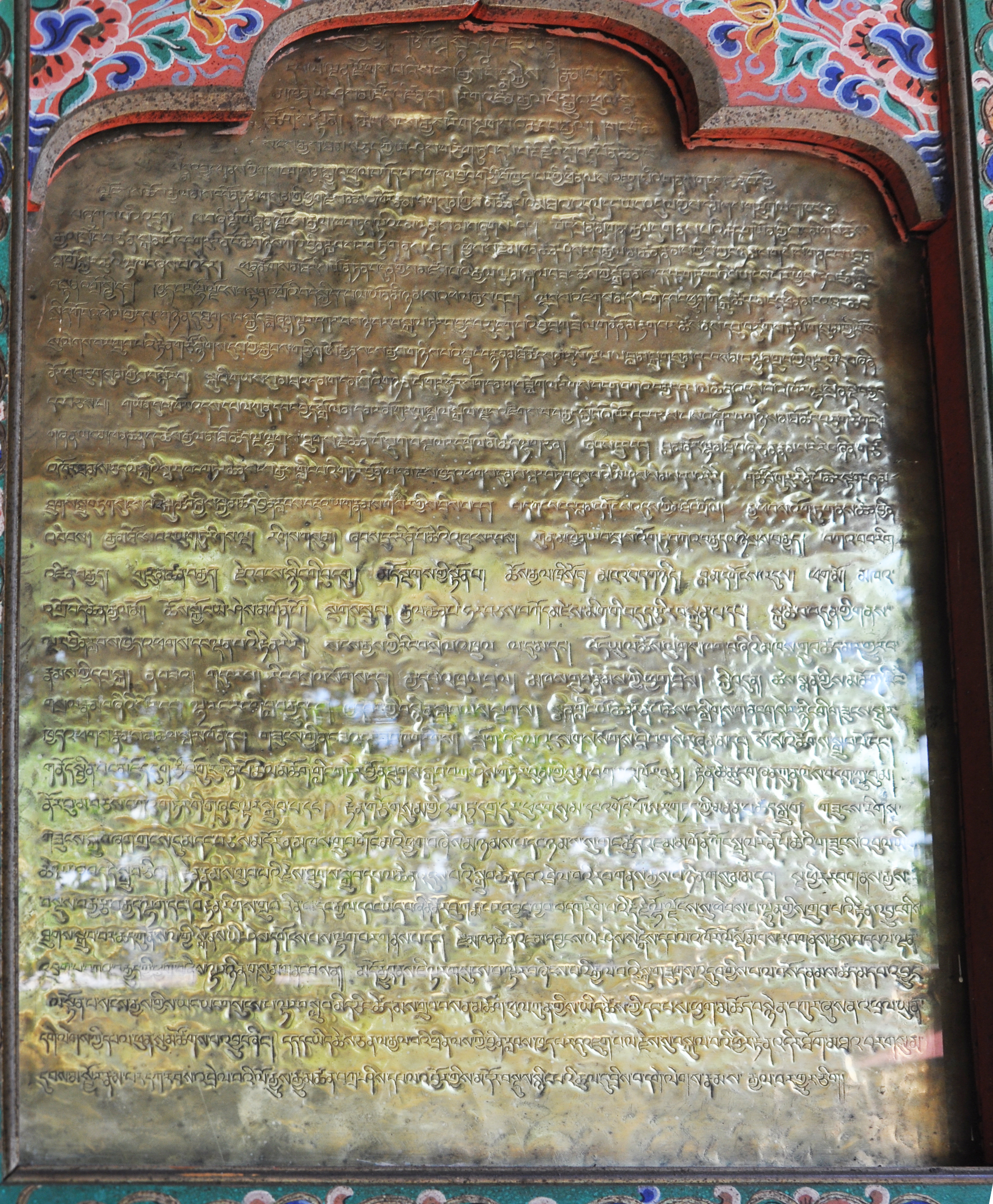
Inscription on brass sheet at Kyichu Lakahang

== Geomancy ==
The temple is part of a network of 12 temples arranged around Jo-khang temple at Lhasa. All of them were built in the time of King Songtsen Gampo.

== Kyichu Lhakhang Festival ==
The annual three-day festival, Kichu Zangchoe Moenlam or the “Rite of Great Accomplishment” is performed from the 22nd day of the 8th month of the lunar calendar.

== Bibliography ==
- Supawan Pui Lamsam, ed. (2015). Kyichu Lhakang: The Sacred Jewel of Bhutan. Dungchen Sangay Dorji (editor). Bangkok: Gatshel Publishing. p. 172. ISBN 9786169128922.
- Thinley, Lopen Kunzang (2008). Wangdi, Pema (ed.). Seeds of Faith: A Comprehensive Guide to the Sacred Places of Bhutan. Vol. 1. Thimphu: KMT Publishers. pp. 106–107. ISBN 99936-22-42-7.
- Dudjom Jigdrel Yeshe Dorje (1991). The Nyingma School of Tibetan Buddhism: Its Fundamentals and History. Gyurme Dorje (trans.). Somerville: Wisdom Publications. pp. 797–798. ISBN 0-86171-199-8.
