= Cyclone Amphan =

North Indian Ocean cyclone in 2020

Super Cyclonic Storm Amphan
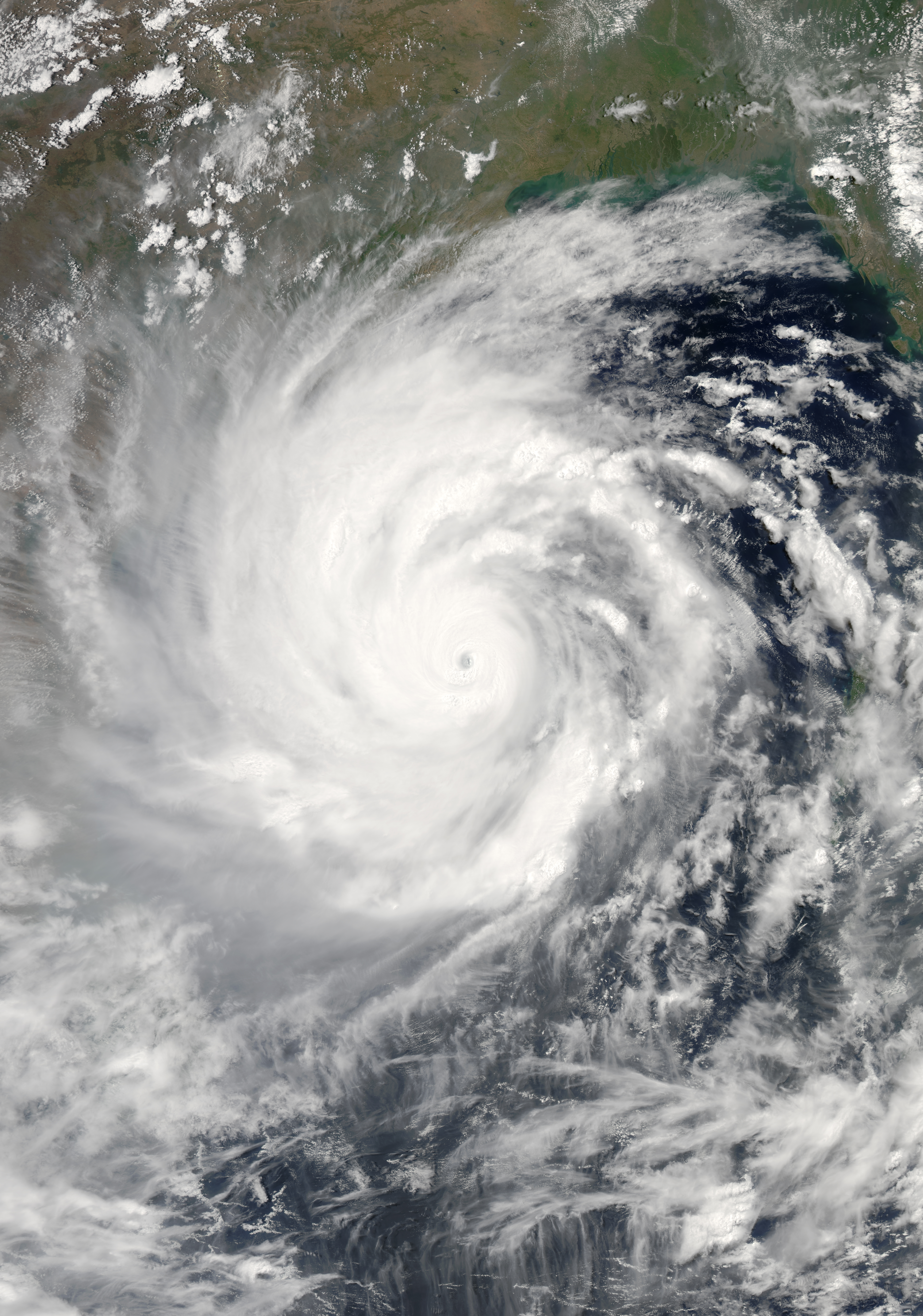
- Amphan near peak intensity over the Bay of Bengal on 18 May

Meteorological history
- Formed: 16 May 2020
- Dissipated: 21 May 2020

Super cyclonic storm
- 3-minute sustained (IMD)
- Highest winds: 240 km/h (150 mph)
- Lowest pressure: 920 hPa (mbar); 27.17 inHg

Category 5-equivalent tropical cyclone
- 1-minute sustained (SSHWS/JTWC)
- Highest winds: 270 km/h (165 mph)
- Lowest pressure: 901 hPa (mbar); 26.61 inHg

Overall effects
- Fatalities: 133 total
- Damage: $15.5 billion (2020 USD) (Second costliest on record in the North Indian Ocean; third costliest when adjusted for inflation)
- Areas affected: India (West Bengal, Odisha, Andaman Islands), Bangladesh, Sri Lanka, Bhutan, Myanmar, Thailand
- IBTrACS
- Part of the 2020 North Indian Ocean cyclone season

Super Cyclonic Storm Amphan (Note: The name Amphan (Thai: อำพัน, [ʔam˧ pʰan˧]) was contributed by Thailand and means "ambers" in Thai. The name could also be (Thai: อัมพร, [ʔam˧ pʰɔːn˧]), a poetic word for "sky.") was an extremely powerful and devastating tropical cyclone that caused widespread damage in Eastern India, specifically in West Bengal and Odisha, and in Bangladesh, in May 2020. It was the strongest tropical cyclone to strike the Ganges Delta. It was the strongest tropical cyclone to hit India since 1999. It was a rare cyclone that lashed northern Bangladesh from Rajshahi to Rangpur in the early hours of 21 May with strong winds. It caused severe damage to mango production of Rajshahi and Rangpur. It was also the fourth super cyclone that hit West Bengal and Kolkata, causing at least 133 fatalities and forcing the evacuation of over 4 million people. The storm severely disrupted power and telecommunication networks, leaving Kolkata and surrounding rural districts (such as North 24 Parganas and South 24 Parganas) without electricity for over a week, while storm surges breached coastal embankments and caused extensive saltwater intrusion in the Sundarbans. Causing over US$15 billion of damage, Amphan was also the costliest cyclone ever recorded in the North Indian Ocean, until it was surpassed by Cyclone Senyar in 2025.

The first tropical cyclone of the 2020 North Indian Ocean cyclone season, Amphan originated from a low-pressure area persisting a couple of hundred miles (300 km) east of Colombo, Sri Lanka, on 13 May 2020. Tracking northeastward, the disturbance organized over exceptionally warm sea surface temperatures; the Joint Typhoon Warning Center (JTWC) upgraded the system to a tropical depression on 15 May while the India Meteorological Department (IMD) followed suit the following day. On 17 May, Amphan underwent rapid intensification and became an extremely severe cyclonic storm within 12 hours. On 18 May, at approximately 12:00 UTC, Amphan reached its peak intensity with 3-minute sustained wind speeds of 240 km/h (150 mph), 1-minute sustained wind speeds of 270 km/h (165 mph), and a minimum central barometric pressure of 920 mbar (27.17 inHg). The storm began an eyewall replacement cycle shortly after it reached its peak intensity, but the continued effects of dry air and wind shear disrupted this process and caused Amphan to gradually weaken as it paralleled the eastern coastline of India. On 20 May, 12:00 UTC, the cyclone made landfall in West Bengal, near Bakkhali, generating a storm surge of 2.5 to 5 metres (8.2 to 16.4 ft). At the time, the JTWC estimated Amphan's 1-minute sustained winds to be 175 km/h (110 mph). Amphan rapidly weakened once inland and dissipated shortly thereafter.

Coastal areas in West Bengal comprising West Midnapore, East Midnapore, North 24 Parganas, South 24 Parganas, Kolkata, Hooghly and Howrah were heavily affected by the cyclone. It created havoc in the metro city of Kolkata. where winds exceeding 130 km/h (80 mph) uprooted over 5,000 trees, severed power lines, and flooded Kolkata Airport. In total, the storm caused 133 fatalities—including 98 in West Bengal—and resulted in ₹1.02 lakh crore (US$13.2 billion) in damage in West Bengal alone. It also caused significant destruction in Bangladesh, bringing rain and strong winds to Rajshahi and Rangpur.

== Meteorological history ==
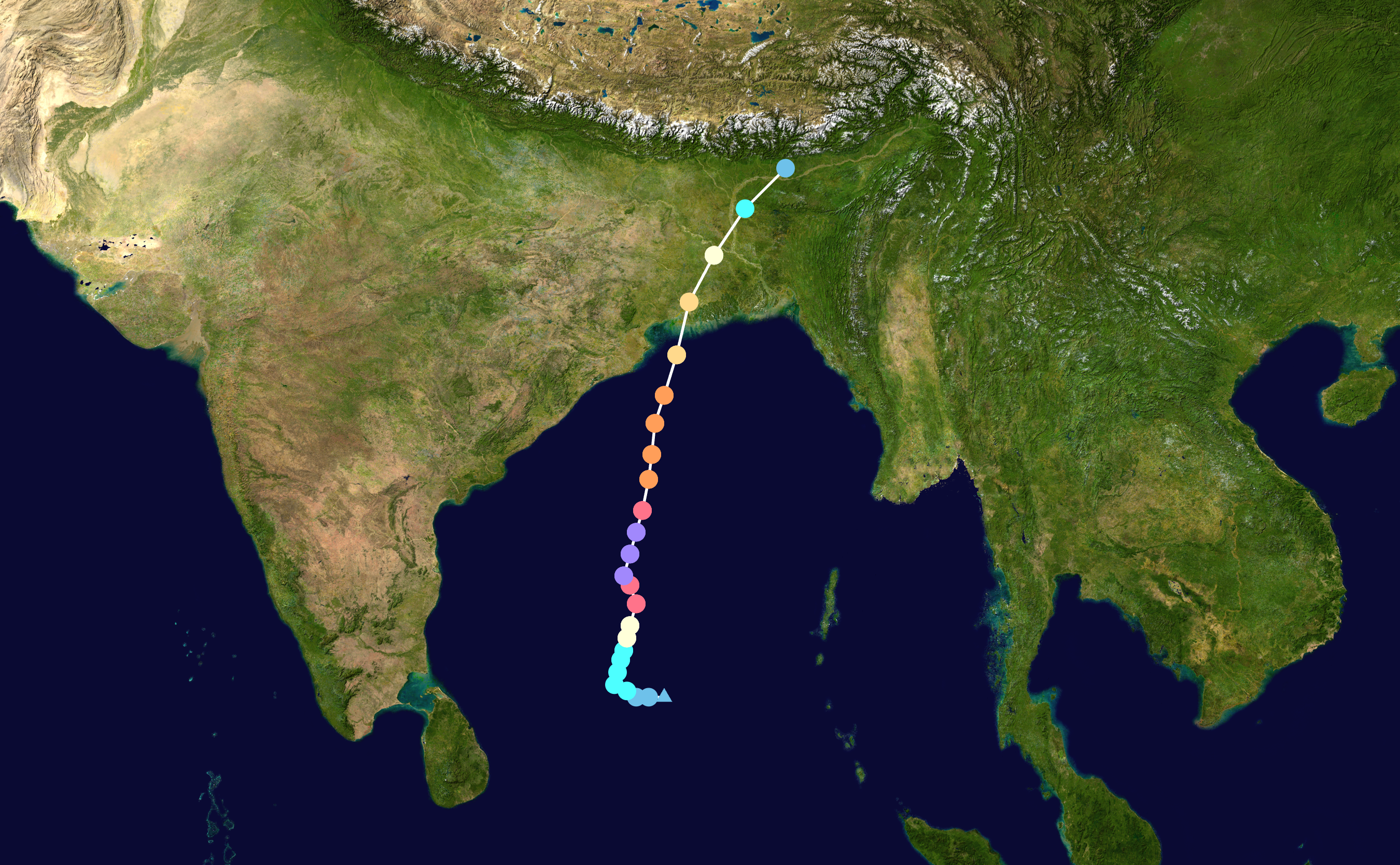
Map plotting the storm's track and intensity, according to the Saffir–Simpson scale Map key Saffir–Simpson scale Tropical depression (≤38 mph, ≤62 km/h) Tropical storm (39–73 mph, 63–118 km/h) Category 1 (74–95 mph, 119–153 km/h) Category 2 (96–110 mph, 154–177 km/h) Category 3 (111–129 mph, 178–208 km/h) Category 4 (130–156 mph, 209–251 km/h) Category 5 (≥157 mph, ≥252 km/h) Unknown Storm type Tropical cyclone Subtropical cyclone Extratropical cyclone, remnant low, tropical disturbance, or monsoon depression

During 13 May 2020, an area of low pressure developed over the Southeastern Bay of Bengal about 1020 km (635 mi) to the southeast of Visakhapatnam in the Indian state of Andhra Pradesh. The area of low pressure was located within a favorable environment for further development with good equator-ward outflow, exceptionally warm sea surface temperatures between 32 and 34 °C recorded in the basin, and low vertical wind shear. Over the next couple of days, the system became more marked as it gradually consolidated further, with bands of deep atmospheric convection wrapping into the system's low-level center. During 16 May, the India Meteorological Department (IMD) reported that the area of low pressure had developed into a depression and designated it as BOB 01 while it was located about 1,100 km (685 mi) to the south of Paradip in the Indian state of Odisha.

Most intense North Indian cyclones
Rank	Cyclone	Year	Min. pressure
1	1999 Odisha	1999	912 hPa (26.93 inHg)
2	1991 Bangladesh	1991	918 hPa (27.11 inHg)
3	Three	1963	920 hPa (27.17 inHg)
3	1990 Andhra Pradesh	1990	920 hPa (27.17 inHg)
3	Gonu	2007	920 hPa (27.17 inHg)
3	Amphan	2020	920 hPa (27.17 inHg)
7	Kyarr	2019	922 hPa (27.23 inHg)
8	Gay	1989	930 hPa (27.46 inHg)
9	Mocha	2023	931 hPa (27.49 inHg)
10	2001 India	2001	932 hPa (27.52 inHg)
10	Fani	2019	932 hPa (27.52 inHg)

Moving northwards, the depression continually organised and became a cyclonic storm a few hours later, receiving the name Amphan. Intensification was temporarily impeded as moderate easterly wind shear disrupted the system's cloud pattern. On 17 May, conditions for significant intensification became more conducive as upper-level winds improved. As a result, Amphan underwent explosive intensification, with the U.S.-based Joint Typhoon Warning Center (JTWC) assessing an increase in winds from 140 km/h (85 mph) at 12:00 UTC to 215 km/h (135 mph), the equivalent to a Category 4 hurricane on the Saffir–Simpson scale (SSHWS), just six hours later. Furthermore, the IMD upgraded Amphan to an extremely severe cyclonic storm on their cyclone intensity scale. At 10:30 UTC, the IMD assessed Amphan as peaking as a super cyclonic storm with 3-minute sustained winds of 240 km/h (150 mph) and a minimum pressure of 920 hectopascals (27.17 inHg), while the JTWC set the peak about eight hours later with 1-minute sustained winds of 270 km/h (165 mph), or Category 5-equivalent intensity. The broad storm was characterized by a cloud shield extending more than 1,110 km (690 mi) and a sharply-outlined 10 nautical mile-wide eye.

Early on 18 May, microwave imagery depicted two distinct concentric eyewalls, a telltale sign of an eyewall replacement cycle that is typical for very intense cyclones. Through the day, the effects of wind shear and dry air hampered this internal core change, causing the eyewall to erode by late on 18 May. Around 5:30 p.m. IST (12:00 UTC), Amphan made landfall as a Very Severe Cyclonic storm near Bakkhali, West Bengal with winds of 155 km/h (95 mph). As it moved further inland, Amphan rapidly weakened. Just six hours after landfall, the JTWC downgraded the storm to a Category 1-equivalent cyclone and issued its final warning on the system, as it became disorganized. On 21 May, Amphan degenerated into a well-marked low pressure area.

== Preparations ==
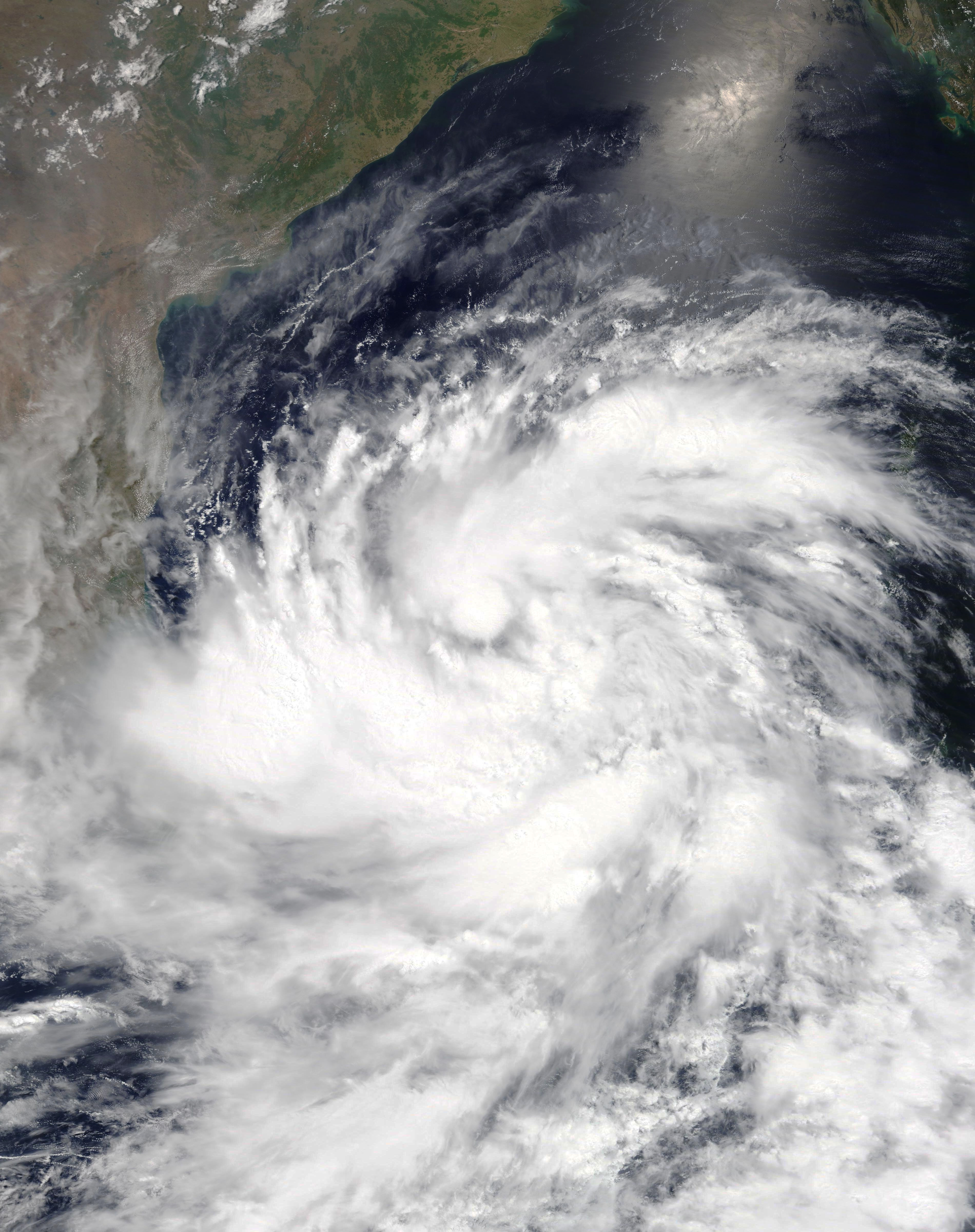
Amphan shortly after being classified as a depression on 16 May

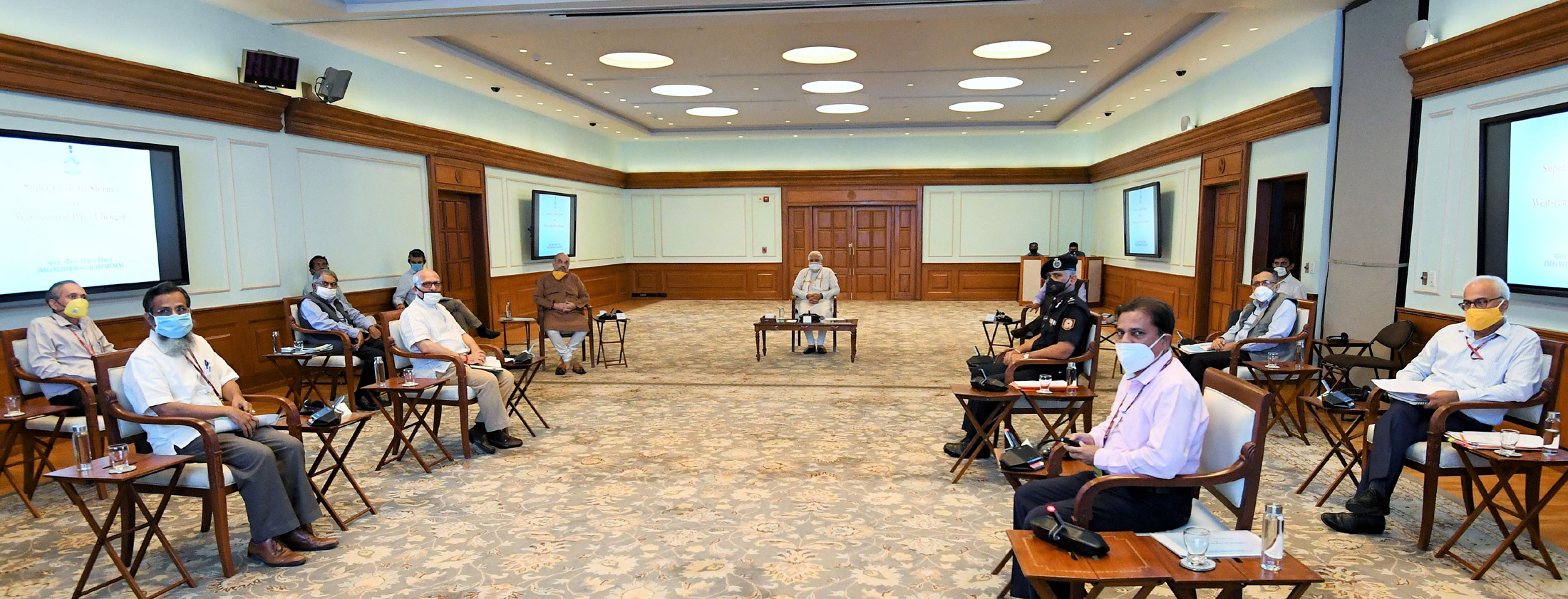
Prime Minister Narendra Modi chairing a high-level meeting to review the response measures against cyclone Amphan, in New Delhi on 18 May 2020

Amphan's forecast track placed 38.9 million people in India and Bangladesh at risk of exposure to the storm's winds, according to the US Pacific Disaster Center. The formation of the precursor low-pressure system prompted the IMD to issue a cyclonic alert for India's coastline along the Bay of Bengal, advising fishermen not to sail to susceptible locations in the Bay of Bengal from 15 to 18 May. Fishermen from Sri Lanka were also advised by the national government to return to or remain in the country, and additional maritime traffic from Singapore and other countries were advised to remain clear of Amphan's vicinity. Ships and aircraft of the Indian Coast Guard directed fishing boats to harbour in coordination with the administrations and fisheries departments of Odisha and West Bengal. The Maritime Rescue Coordination Centre in Chennai activated an International Safety Net for the Bay of Bengal. Ports were cleared and their operations suspended along the Bay of Bengal, while ferry service along major routes in Bangladesh was suspended by the Bangladesh Inland Water Transport Corporation. Bangladeshi ports suspended the loading and unloading of goods on board ships. Smaller vessels in the harbour at Chittagong were moved to safety upstream the Karnaphuli River. Ships were ordered out of some ports, such as the port of Paradip, to avoid damage. Public works departments were called upon by the government of Odisha to ensure infrastructure resiliency; crews and backup systems for electricity and telecommunications were deployed to meet these needs, establishing helplines for emergency response. Rail and vehicular traffic in Odisha and West Bengal was halted or rerouted. The Shramik train service for migrant workers was halted in both states for up to four days, with service expected to be curtailed in the storm's aftermath. Other migrants travelling to Odisha were asked to wait out the storm. AC Express special trains operating routes between New Delhi and Bhubaneswar were diverted to avoid the cyclone's effects. Netaji Subhas Chandra Bose International Airport in Kolkata was closed until 21 May, with planes evacuating or chocked and the airport terminal roof fortified to minimize damage.

Prime Minister Narendra Modi held a meeting with Minister of Home Affairs Amit Shah, Chief Minister of West Bengal Mamata Banerjee, Chief Minister of Odisha Naveen Patnaik and other officials on 18 May to review preparations and evacuation plans. Chief Minister of West Bengal, Mamata Banerjee announced on the day of hitting of cyclone, that all the areas through which the cyclone will pass are to be disconnected from the power supply until the disaster passed on, except the important places like hospitals, fire station etc. Teams from the Odisha Disaster Rapid Action Force and National Disaster Response Force (NDRF) were pre-positioned across districts in Odisha and West Bengal on 17 May to assist in preparations for Amphan and render aid where necessary, with additional units placed on standby; these units could be readily airlifted to affected areas on board Indian Air Force transport aircraft. The National Disaster Management Authority advised that these crews and other first responders would also need personal protective equipment and N95 masks due to the ongoing pandemic. A diving team from the Indian Navy was sent to Kolkata to aid relief efforts, with ships from the navy placed on standby for relief operations.

The Bangladesh Cyclone Preparedness Programme and National Disaster Response Coordination Group convened on 18 May to outline preparations for Amphan. Several non-governmental agencies coordinated with the Cyclone Preparedness Programme to support Rohingya refugees at camps in Cox's Bazar during Amphan. The Department of Public Health Engineering distributed sanitation supplies and set up 15 water treatment plants. All 32 Rohingya camps in Cox's Bazar were staffed with relief volunteers. Health services in Bangladesh during the storm were reinforced by 1,933 medical teams distributed around Bangladesh. Fifteen thousand volunteers and 284 medical teams were prepared to render aid around Chittagong. According to Inter-Services Public Relations, 145 disaster management teams from the Bangladesh Armed Forces were placed on standby with special equipment. The Bangladesh Army deployed 71 medical teams and arranged 18,400 packets and relief materials in preparation for Amphan's aftermath. Twenty-five ships were dispatched by the Bangladesh Navy to handle emergency, rescue, and relief operations, with aerial support from the Bangladesh Air Force. The Ministry of Agriculture of Bangladesh advised coastal farmers to harvest all mature paddy fields to mitigate the estimated loss of 12 percent of crop yield. Seven thousand domestic animals were also moved to shelter under the direction of the Ministry of Fisheries and Livestock.

Satellite animation of Amphan rapidly intensifying on 17 May

An IMD yellow alert was active for 13 of Kerala's 14 districts on 18 May, while an orange alert was issued by the agency for West Bengal, anticipating extensive damage in six districts. The Bangladesh Meteorological Department issued cyclone danger signal #10, their highest warning, at the Port of Mongla and the Port of Payra on 20 May, signifying "great danger" due to Amphan with winds expected to exceed 89 km/h (55 mph). Signal #10 was also issued for eleven coastal districts, in addition to offshore islands and islands within the Ganges Delta. Flood and landslide warnings were issued by the Disaster Management Centre of Sri Lanka on 19 May. Boats, helicopters, and crews were stationed by the Sri Lanka Air Force and Sri Lanka Navy throughout the island to bolster emergency response. Coastal provinces of Thailand along the Andaman Sea were warned by the Thai Meteorological Department of the threat of heavy rain on 19 May. Storm alerts issued by the Thai Department of Disaster Prevention and Mitigation encompassed 62 provinces, including Bangkok, while warnings for flash floods, high waves, and landslides were issued for 14 provinces in southern Thailand. The National Centre for Hydrology and Meteorology of Bhutan warned of the possibility of flash flooding and landslides in the country. The Bhutanese Department of Disaster Management advised against travelling, particularly in southern Bhutan.

=== Evacuations ===
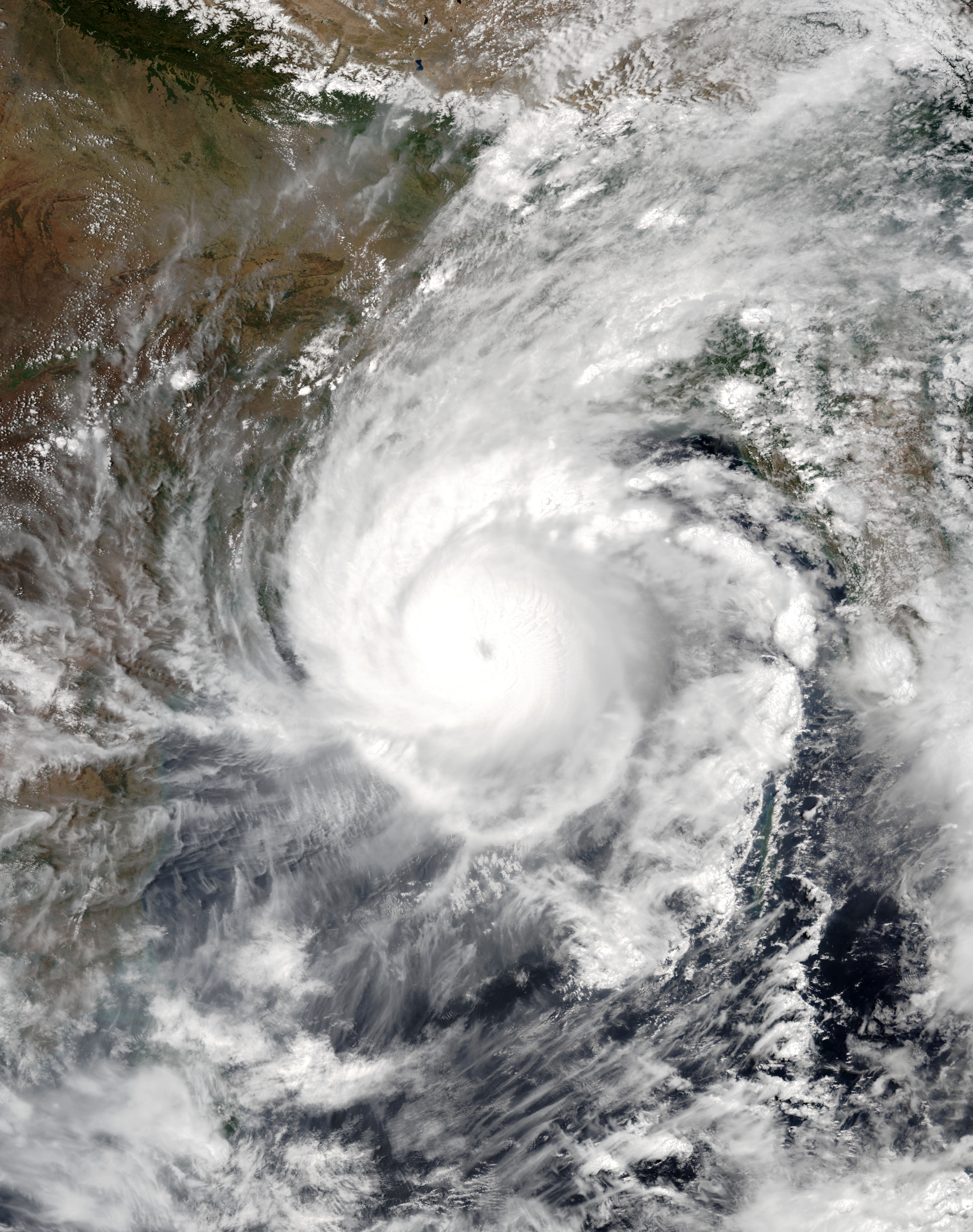
Amphan approaching East India and Bangladesh on 19 May

The government of Odisha directed the magistrates of four districts on 15 May to establish shelter homes for possible evacuees. Odisha Chief Secretary Asit Kumar Tripathy initially identified 403 possible cyclone shelters in areas potentially impacted by Amphan, though 105 served as temporary medical centres for quarantines associated with the concurrent COVID-19 pandemic. Shelters could only be filled to one-third capacity to maintain social distancing guidelines due to the pandemic. Social distancing restrictions in West Bengal reduced evacuation capacity in shelters from 500,000 people to 200,000 people. The Kolkata Municipal Corporation located schools and community centres for possible use as temporary shelters to augment evacuation capacity. At least 1,704 shelters were ultimately established in Odisha and more than 2,000 were used in West Bengal, including schools and public buildings. Pandemic constraints on shelters in Bangladesh prompted deputy commissioners in 19 coastal districts to seize educational institutions and mosques for use as shelters. More than 12,000 shelters were opened across Bangladesh, supplied with food and emergency cash from the Bangladeshi Ministry of Disaster Management and Relief and yielding capacity for 5.19 million evacuees. There were 5,767 more shelters in Bangladesh for Amphan than for Cyclone Bulbul, which struck the country in November 2019, due in part to social distancing restrictions.

Approximately 4.2 million people were evacuated in coastal India and Bangladesh, with roughly 2 million from India and 2.2 million from Bangladesh. Most of the evacuations in India occurred in West Bengal. Over a million people were expected to evacuate from areas near the Bangladesh–India border. Around 4,000 personnel from the SDRF oversaw evacuations in India. Evacuations began on 17 May in Jagatsinghpur, beginning with the elderly and pregnant living in thatched homes. Magistrates were directed to begin evacuating residents from vulnerable homes and low-lying areas in Odisha the following day. The Odisha government took a more targeted evacuation approach for Amphan than in previous storms where more widespread evacuations were utilized. Odisha had shelter capacity for up 1.1 million evacuees, though only 10 percent was expected to be used. Over 141,000 people were ultimately moved to shelters in coastal Odisha. The government of West Bengal planned to evacuate 200,000 people from their homes by 18 May; nearly 300,000 people evacuated in total from the state, including 200,000 from North 24 Parganas district and more than 40,000 from Sagar Island. The NDRF reported that over 500,000 people evacuated from Odisha and West Bengal. Officials farther inland in Dhanbad and Bokaro Steel City, Jharkhand, were also instructed to move people from susceptible housing to safety. Two million people were expected to evacuate from low-lying areas of Bangladesh on 19 May; Enamur Rahman, the Minister of Disaster Management and Relief, stated that the evacuation for Amphan in Bangladesh was unprecedented in scale. Trawlers were used to evacuate thousands from the sediment islands in the Ganges Delta to the Bangladeshi mainland. Approximately 50,000 people were evacuated from the islands of the Sundarbans.

== Impact ==
Fatalities by country
Country	Fatalities	Ref.
India	103	
Bangladesh	26	
Sri Lanka	4	
Total	133	

=== India ===
==== Eastern India ====
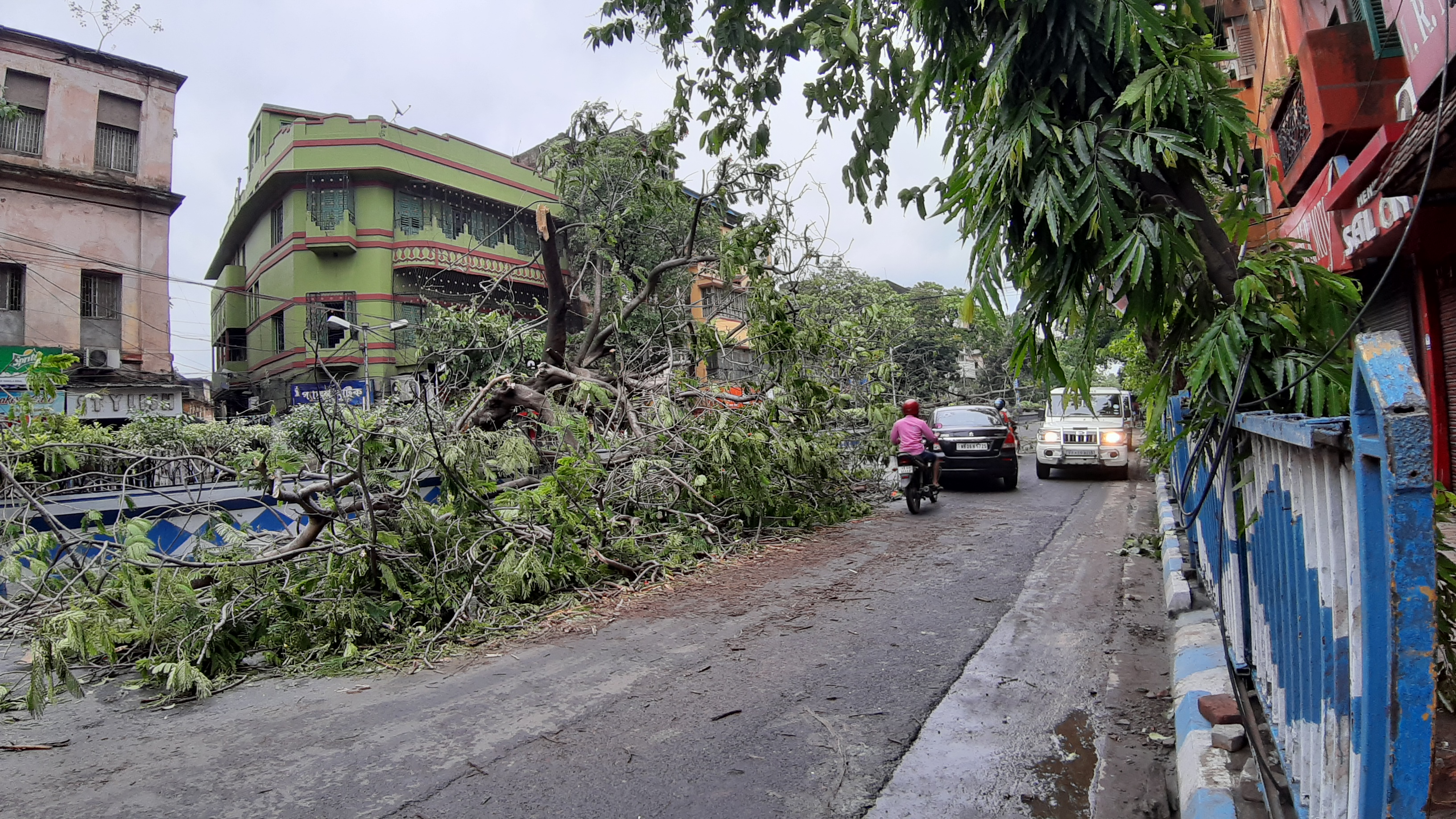
Damage from Cyclone Amphan in Kolkata

Amphan made landfall near Bakkhali in West Bengal at 2:30 p.m. IST on 20 May, buffeting the region with strong winds and heavy rains. Although the extent of fatalities was less than initially feared, the cyclone's effects were nonetheless widespread and deadly. West Bengal, the epicenter of the cyclone's landfall, saw the most widespread damage from Amphan. The storm was considered the strongest to hit the region in over a decade. At least 86 people died in West Bengal; most of the fatalities were due to electrocution or the collapse of homes. The state government estimated that the storm caused at least ₹1.02 trillion (US$13.5 billion) in damages and directly affected 70 percent of the state's population. Chief Minister Mamata Banerjee described the storm's effects there as worse than that of COVID-19. An estimated storm surge of 5 m (16 ft) inundated a wide swath of coastal communities and communications were severed. The greatest inundations were expected in the Sundarbans, where flooding could extend 15 km (9.3 mi) inland. Embankments in the region were overtaken by the surge, leading to inundation of the islands in the Sundarbans. Bridges linking islands to the Indian mainland were swept away. The cyclone produced sustained winds of 112 km/h (70 mph) and gusts to 190 km/h (120 mph), which were recorded by the Alipore observatory, Kolkata, West Bengal, damaging homes and uprooting trees and electric poles. Wind speed along coastal areas were measured up to 150–160 km/h (93–99 mph). In Canning a wind speed of 157 km/h (98 mph) with gusting up to 185 km/h (115 mph) was recorded, while nearby nimpith and Sagar Island observed 155 and 111 km/h (96 and 69 mph) wind speed. The Netaji Subhas Chandra Bose International Airport recorded wind speeds up to 133 km/h (83 mph). Kolkata and its surrounding recorded highest wind speed of 110–130 km/h at 7-8 pm and rainfall between 220 and 240 mm was recorded in Kolkata and its surroundings on 20 May 2020. In Kolkata, the strong winds overturned vehicles and snapped approximately 10,000 trees. The streets were waterlogged and trees blocking the roads. The airport was remained shut and became waterlogged, many structural damages were reported. The Calcutta Municipal Corporation stated that Amphan toppled over 4,000 electric poles, leaving much of the city without power for over 14 hours. At least 19 people were killed in Kolkata. The storm also triggered widespread flooding around the city. 236 mm of rain was recorded in Kolkata.

Costliest known North Indian cyclones (adjusted for inflation)
Rank	Cyclone	Season	Damage (2025 USD)
1	ESCS Nargis	2008	$22.9 billion
2	CS Senyar	2025	$20.1 billion
3	SuCS Amphan	2020	$19.3 billion
4	ESCS Hudhud	2014	$15 billion
5	ESCS Fani	2019	$10.2 billion
6	SuCS BOB 06	1999	$8.58 billion
7	SuCS Gonu	2007	$6.86 billion
8	ESCS ARB 02	1998	$5.93 billion
9	ESCS Phailin	2013	$5.89 billion
10	VSCS Vardah	2016	$4.53 billion

Satellite animation of Amphan making landfall over West Bengal on 20 May

Downed power lines caused power outages across West Bengal, prompting CM Mamata Banerjee to order power supplies to be cut in the two states of 24 Parganas as a precautionary measure. In North 24 Parganas, 2 people were killed and up to 5,500 homes were damaged. Thousands of mud homes were damaged in the neighboring Hooghly district. A million homes were damaged in South 24 Parganas and breached embankments led to the flooding of villages and swaths of cropland. About 26,000 homes were destroyed in Gosaba. Saltwater inundation affected surrounding areas following damage to 19 km (12 mi) of nearby embankments. Around 150 km from the area in Nadia, the storm caused severe damage. Across West Bengal, 88,000 hectares (220,000 acres) of rice paddies and 200,000 hectares (490,000 acres) of vegetable and sesame crops were damaged.

Neighboring Odisha saw significant effects. In the Dharma Port, an estimated wind speed of 120 km/h (75 mph) In Bhadrak, rainfall reached 384.6 mm (15.14 in). Approximately 1,167 km (725 mi) of power lines of varying voltages, 126,540 transformers, and 448 electrical substations were affected, leaving 3.4 million without power. Damage to the power grid reached ₹3.2 billion (US$42 million). Four people died in Odisha, two from collapsed objects, one due to drowning, and one from head trauma. Due to high gust winds and intense rainfall, districts like Bhadrak and Kendrapara suffered especially for the paddy farmers since the paddy fields became unsuitable for paddy cultivation which was inundated by saline water due to storm surge. Across the 10 affected districts in Odisha, 4.4 million people were impacted in some way by the cyclone. At least 500 homes were destroyed and a further 15,000 were damaged. Nearly 4,000 livestock, primarily poultry, died.

==== Southern India ====
Rains and strong winds from Amphan swept across many districts in Kerala beginning on 16 May. Thunderstorms associated with Amphan caused severe coastal erosion in the Valiyathura suburb of Thiruvananthapuram, damaging roads and destroying homes and threatening to displace over a hundred families from their homes. Strong winds inflicted severe damage in Kottayam district, especially in Vaikom taluk, where homes and temples were impacted and trees and electric poles were downed. The tiled roof of the Vaikom Mahadeva Temple was damaged by these winds. A ₹1.47 billion (US$19.3 million) damage toll resulted from the destruction of 16 homes and the partial damage of 313 homes. A high school used as a homeless shelter collapsed, causing minor injuries.

Tamil Nadu faced some impact from the cyclone. Heavy winds damaged at least 100 boats anchored in the Ramanathapuram district. Coastal erosion from rough seas generated by Amphan led to the collapse of three houses at Bommayarpalayam in Viluppuram district. Roughly 35 acres of banana crops around Gandarvakottai and Aranthangi were destroyed. Northern areas of the state have heatwave-like conditions for a week because Amphan took all of the area's moisture.

In Sooradapeta, near Kakinada in Andhra Pradesh, rough seas destroyed 35 homes and damaged several others.

=== Bangladesh ===
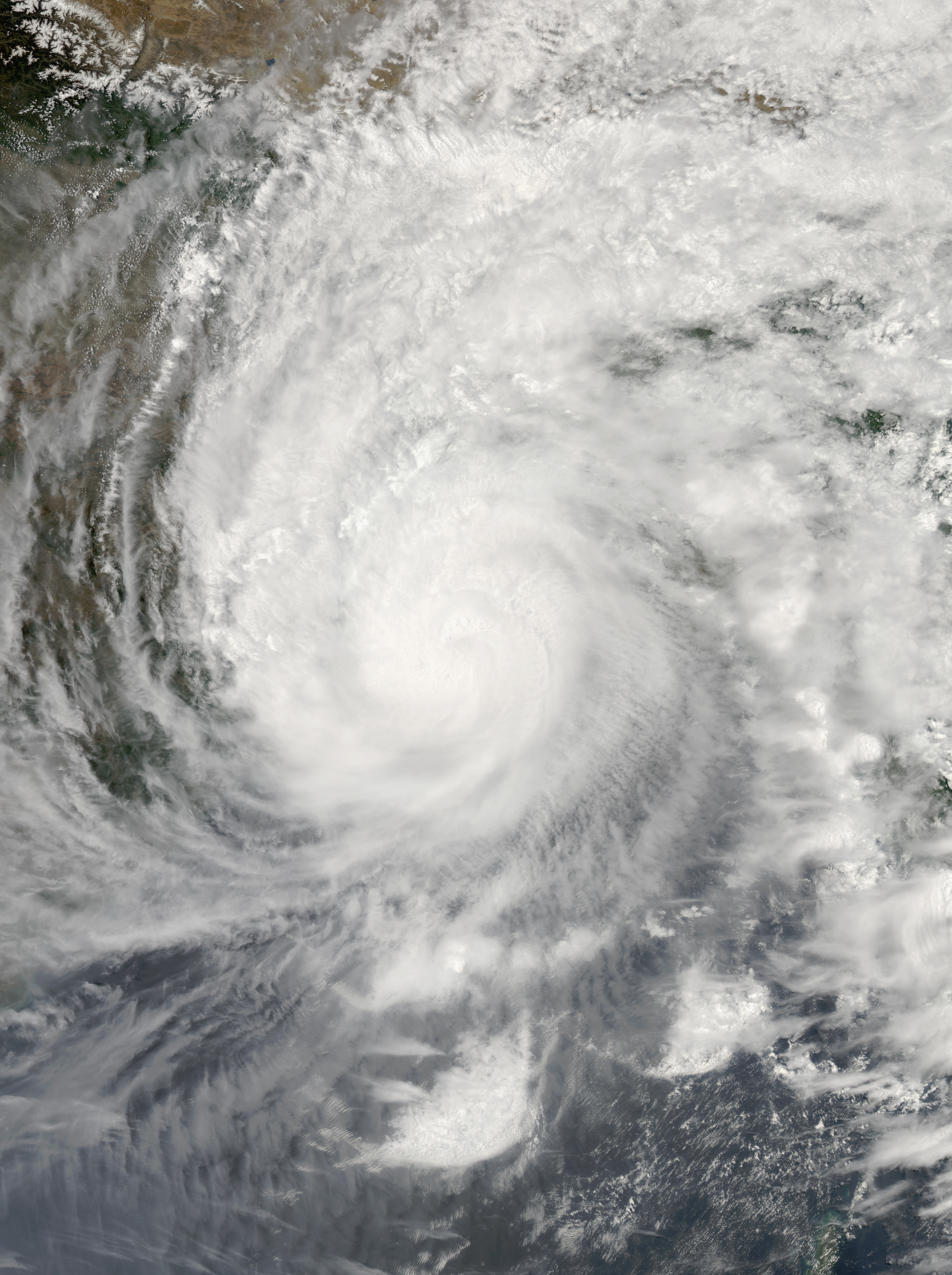
Satellite image of Amphan making landfall on West Bengal on 20 May

Officials feared Amphan would be the deadliest storm in Bangladesh since Cyclone Sidr in 2007, which killed about 3,500 people. The IMD predicted a storm surge as high as 3–5 metres (9.8–16.4 ft). Over a million people were affected by Amphan across nine districts in the divisions of Khulna and Barisal. The cost of cyclone was estimated to be ৳11 billion (US$130 million) initially. Members of the National Disaster Management Council (NDMC) of Bangladesh estimated the damage of Amphan to be ৳127 billion (US$1.5 billion). At least 20 people died in storm-related incidents, including the Cyclone Preparedness Programme leader of unit no. 6 in Dhankhali union Shah Alam, who drowned when his boat capsized. Damaging effects began in Bangladesh prior to the landfall of Amphan as coastal water levels rose. Collapsed embankments led to the inundation of 17 villages across Galachipa, Kalapara, and Rangabali. A ship evacuating residents of a coastal community sank, killing one person. Storm surge destroyed at least 500 homes on an island within the Noakhali District.

Winds in Satkhira topped out at 151 km/h (94 mph). Nearly 220,000 homes were damaged, of which 55,667 were destroyed, rendering an estimated 500,000 people homeless according to the United Nations Office for the Coordination of Humanitarian Affairs. A 2.7 m (8.9 ft) storm surge breached 150 km (93 mi) of embankments, leading to the inundation of roughly 100 villages. In Purba Durgabati, part of a levee was washed away by floodwaters up to 4 metres (13 feet) high, causing 600 houses to be inundated. Low-lying areas in Barishal were submerged 0.9–1.2 m (3.0–3.9 ft) under water. Flooded rivers affected parts of Rangabali and Galachipa upazilas in Patuakhali district and parts of Khulna district. Three hundred shelters in Cox's Bazar were damaged by flooding and landslides. All 65 freshwater ponds in the Sundarbans were inundated by saltwater and numerous kewra trees were uprooted; however, damage to the mangrove forest was less than initially feared. Across 26 districts, approximately 1,100 km (680 mi) of roads and over 200 bridges were damaged.

The Department of Fisheries estimated that ৳2.17 billion (US$25.6 million) in losses to crab, finfish, and shrimp were sustained by 40,800 farmers due primarily to the flooding of farms. These losses were most significant in Khulna and Barisal. Floods severely damaged or destroyed around 3,000 shrimp and crab farms. An estimated 176,000 hectares (430,000 acres) of farmland were affected by Amphan according to the Ministry of Agriculture, with mango farmers in Sathkhira taking the brunt of the agricultural impacts; the Department of Agricultural Extension estimated that Amphan damaged 16 percent of Bangladesh's annual mango production, while as much as 70 percent of mangoes in Sathkhira were damaged. Boro rice paddies, beans, and betel also sustained significant losses due to Amphan. Amphan left 22 million electricity customers without power. Roughly 2,500 phone towers operated by the Association of Mobile Telecom Operators of Bangladesh were disabled by the cyclone.

=== Sri Lanka ===
The cyclone produced heavy rainfall and strong winds in Sri Lanka while intensifying east of the island, affecting some 2,000 people and triggering floods and landslides. Minor flooding occurred along the banks of the Kalu Ganga. Two people were killed as a result of these rains in Ratnapura District, with one killed by a landslide and another by a fallen tree. Landslide-related injuries hospitalized other residents in the area. Two people were killed in Kegalle, where 214 mm (8.4 in) of rain fell in 24 hours. Flash floods in Kottampitiya and Pelmadulla prompted the evacuation of 60 people from homes susceptible to a possible landslide. Over 500 homes were damaged by Amphan, of which 145 were in Polonnaruwa.

=== Bhutan ===
Amphan weakening over Bangladesh as unsettled weather extends into Bhutan

The remnants of Amphan produced several days of unsettled weather across Bhutan, with the Tsirang District in particular seeing three days of heavy rain. Landslides and rockfalls across the nation blocked roadways and damaged homes. Flash flooding in Threna damaged crops and prompted the evacuation of five households. Seventeen yaks and horses died across Lingzhi, Naro, and Soe gewogs. Stemming from damage to fibre-optic cables in Kolkata, Bhutan Telecom saw a total loss of service for 17 hours on 20–21 May and TashiCell saw a 60 percent outage. Power outages occurred in Drepong, Gongdu, Jurmey, Kengkhar, and Silambi gewogs. Rainfall proved beneficial for the country's hydroelectric power production with the Mangdechhu hydroelectric plant producing 791.39 MW of power, more than its intended capacity of 720 MW.

== Aftermath ==
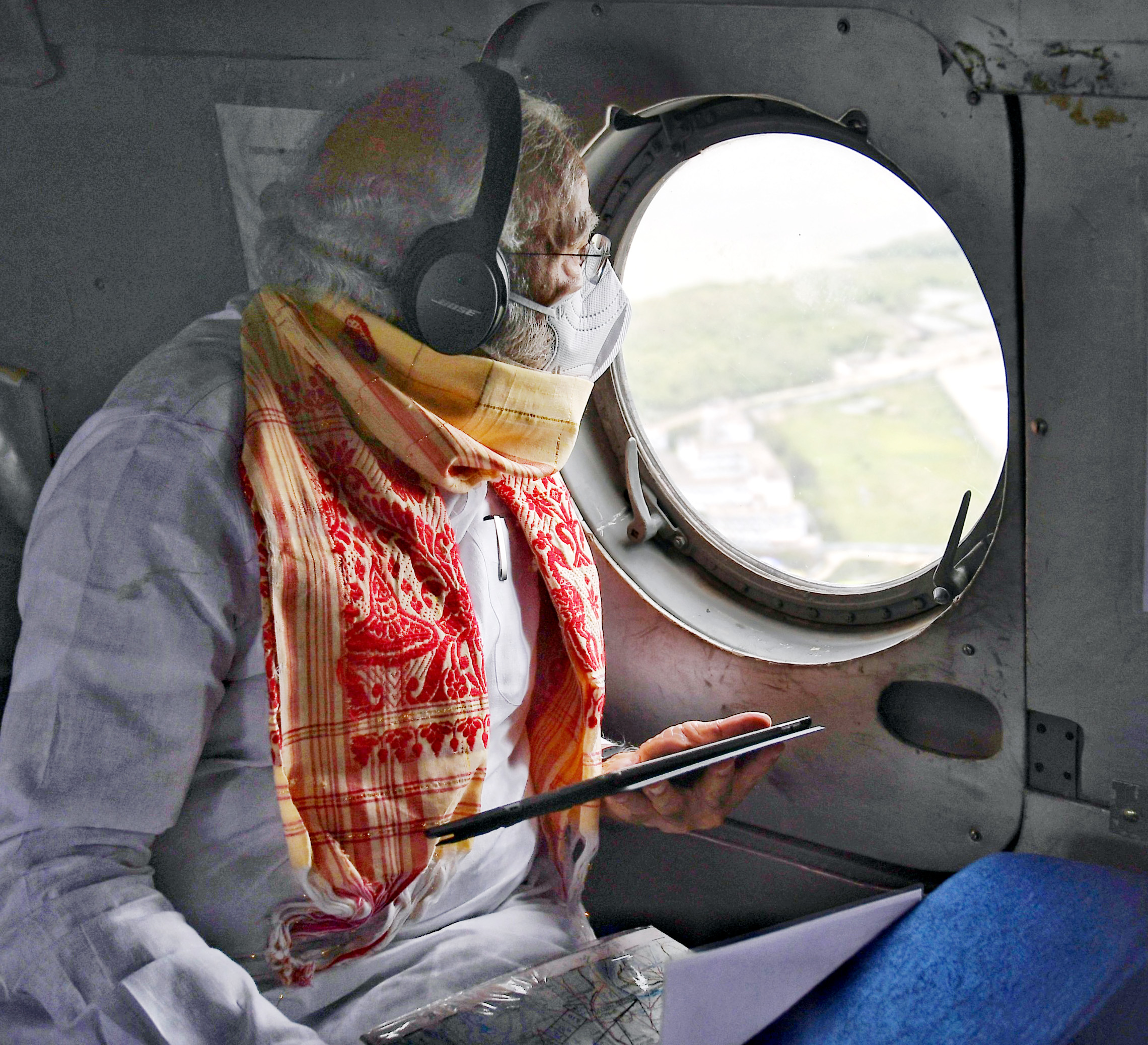
Prime Minister Narendra Modi making an aerial survey of Cyclone Amphan affected areas of West Bengal on 22 May 2020.

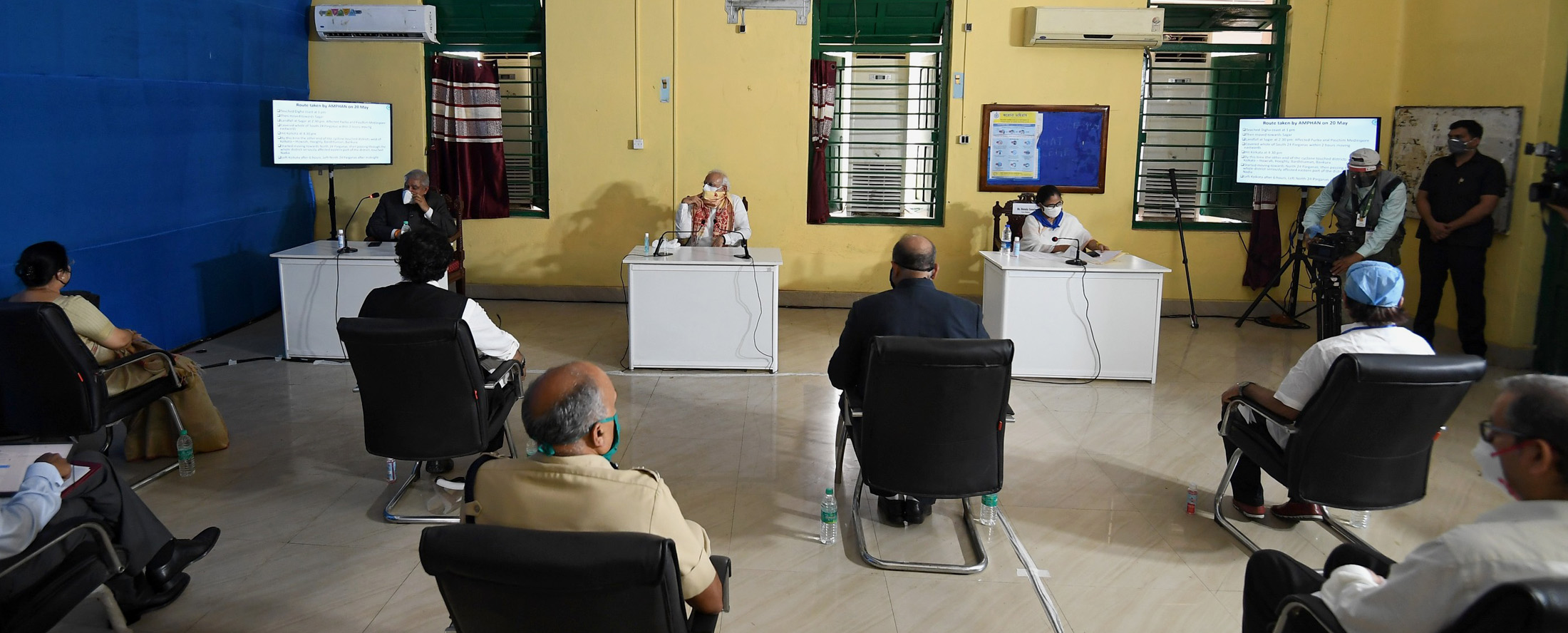
Prime Minister Narendra Modi with West Bengal Chief Minister Mamata Banerjee, held a review meeting after the aerial survey of the Cyclone Amphan affected areas of West Bengal, in Basirhat on 22 May 2020.

On 22 May, Prime Minister Narendra Modi conducted an aerial survey over Kolkata, along with West Bengal Chief Minister Mamata Banerjee. Modi announced a ₹10 billion (US$132 million) immediate relief package for West Bengal and ₹5 billion (US$66.2 million) in relief for Odisha. In advance, Modi announced that ₹200,000 (US$2,650) would be provided to the next of kin of people who died during the storm, and ₹50,000 (US$660) would be given to each injured person. Chief Minister Mamata Banerjee stated that it would take three to four days to assess the damage. Twenty disaster relief teams were dispatched by the Indian Coast Guard to begin search and rescue operations. Ten teams were sent to West Bengal to aid recovery, in addition to the NDRF teams pre-positioned there before Amphan's passage. Approximately 1,000 ground teams worked to restore infrastructure and services in West Bengal after Amphan, though only 25–30 percent of workers were staffed due to the COVID-19 pandemic. The resulting slow restoration of power sparked protests across West Bengal aimed primarily at electricity company CESC. Some restoration efforts were disrupted by these protests. The Home Department of West Bengal requested additional crews from railway and port interest, while five brigades from the Indian Army were deployed in Kolkata and the 24 Parganas districts to support recovery efforts. Additional assistance was requested from Jharkhand and Odisha. The government of Odisha sent 500 members of its disaster rapid action force and fire service to West Bengal. Odisha Chief Minister Naveen Patnaik performed an aerial survey of the damage in his state following Amphan.

The European Union stated that it would initially provide €500,000 (US$545,000) for those affected by the storm in India. German NGO Welthungerlife released 100,000 Euro to fund Cyclone Amphan relief efforts.

The Ministry of Disaster Management and Relief in Bangladesh approved a ৳2.5–3 billion (US$29–35 million) budget to repair embankments damaged by Amphan. Another ৳1.5 billion (US$18 million) was distributed to each district heavily impacted by the storm, along with 500 bundles of corrugated tin sheets. International development organisation BRAC disbursed ৳30 million (US$350,000) to low-income families in 10 upazilas, with ৳5,000 (US$60) per family. The organisation also distributed gloves, masks, and sanitizers to Bagerhat, Khulna, and Satkhira districts.

== See also ==
- Tropical cyclones in 2020
