= Sengor =

Sengor གསེང་སྒོར Seng-Gor, Senggor
- Location in Bhutan
- Coordinates: 27°22′N 91°1′E
- Country: Bhutan
- District: Mongar District
- Village block: Saling Gewog
- Time zone: UTC+6 (BTT)

Sengor is a town in Mongar District in northeastern Bhutan.
