= Drepung Gewog =

Drepong Gewog འབྲེས་སྤུངས་
- Gewogs
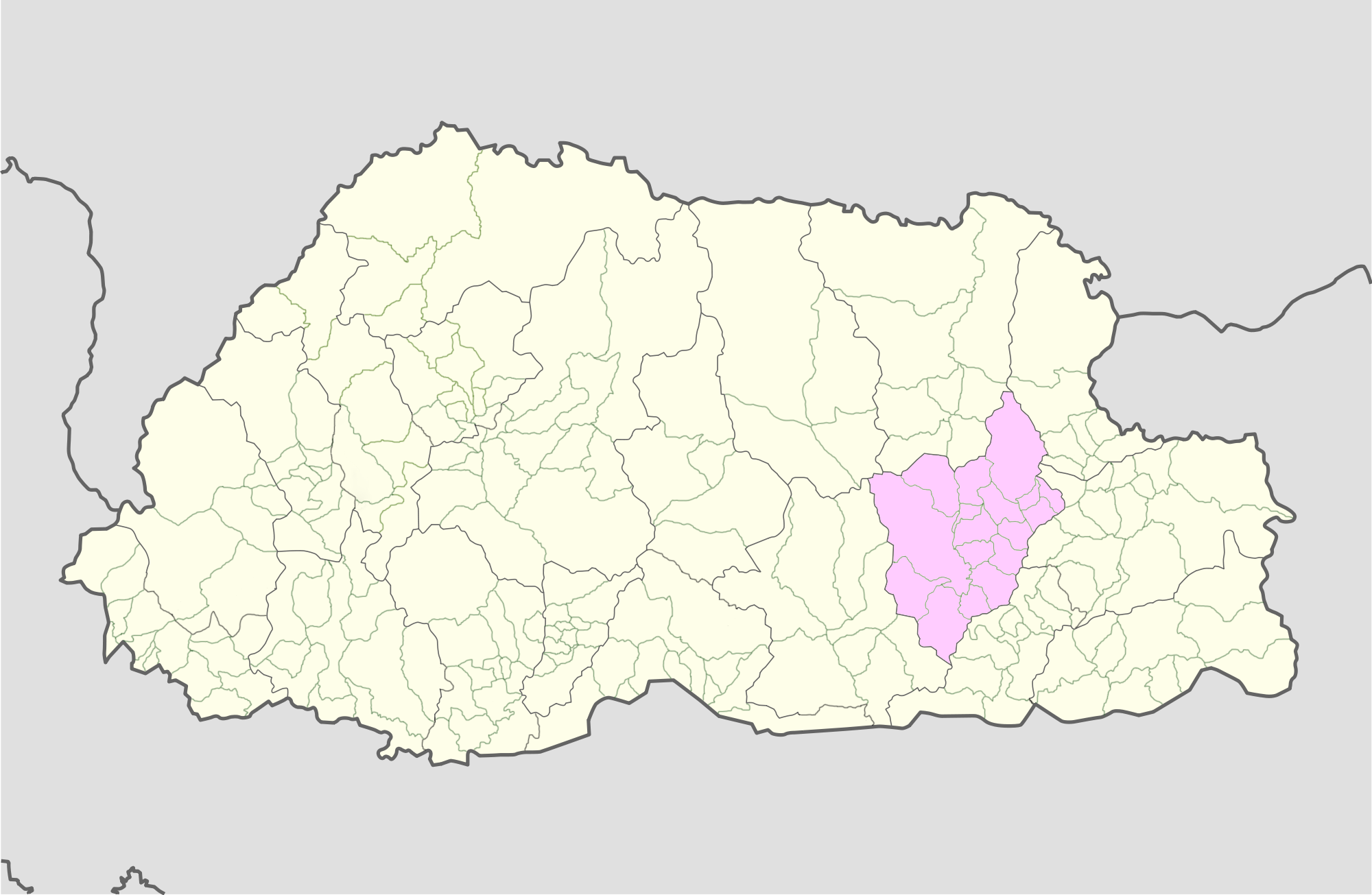
- Country: Bhutan
- District: Mongar District
- Time zone: UTC+6 (BTT)

Drepong Gewog (Dzongkha: འབྲེས་སྤུངས་) is a gewog (village block) of Mongar District, Bhutan.
