= Ngatshang Gewog =

Ngatshang Gewog སྔ་ཚང་
- Gewog
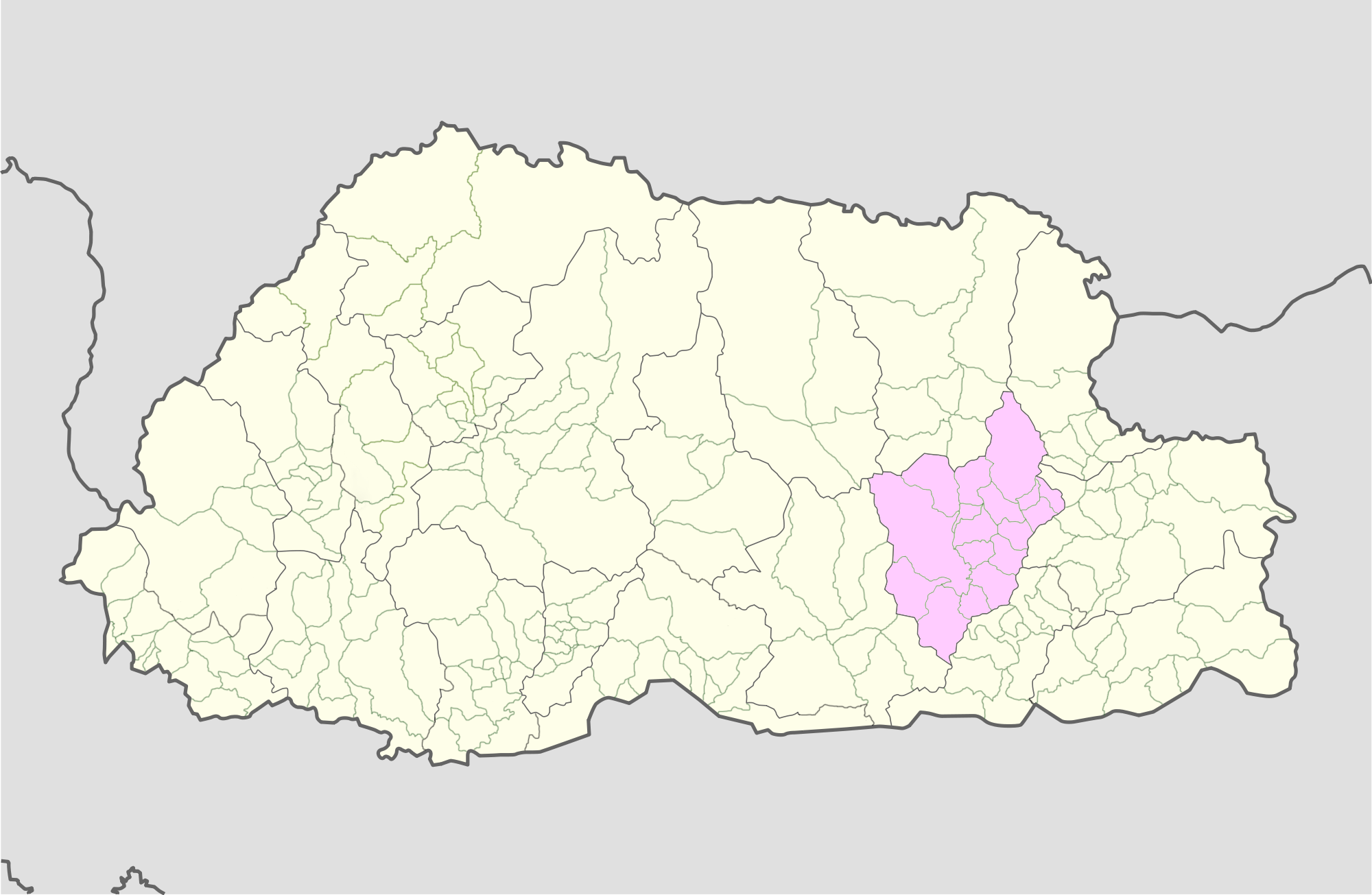
- Country: Bhutan
- District: Mongar District
- Time zone: UTC+6 (BTT)

Ngatshang Gewog (Dzongkha: སྔ་ཚང་) is a gewog (village block) of Mongar District, Bhutan.
