= Chaskhar Gewog =

Chaskhar Gewog ལྕགས་ས་མཁར་
- Gewogs
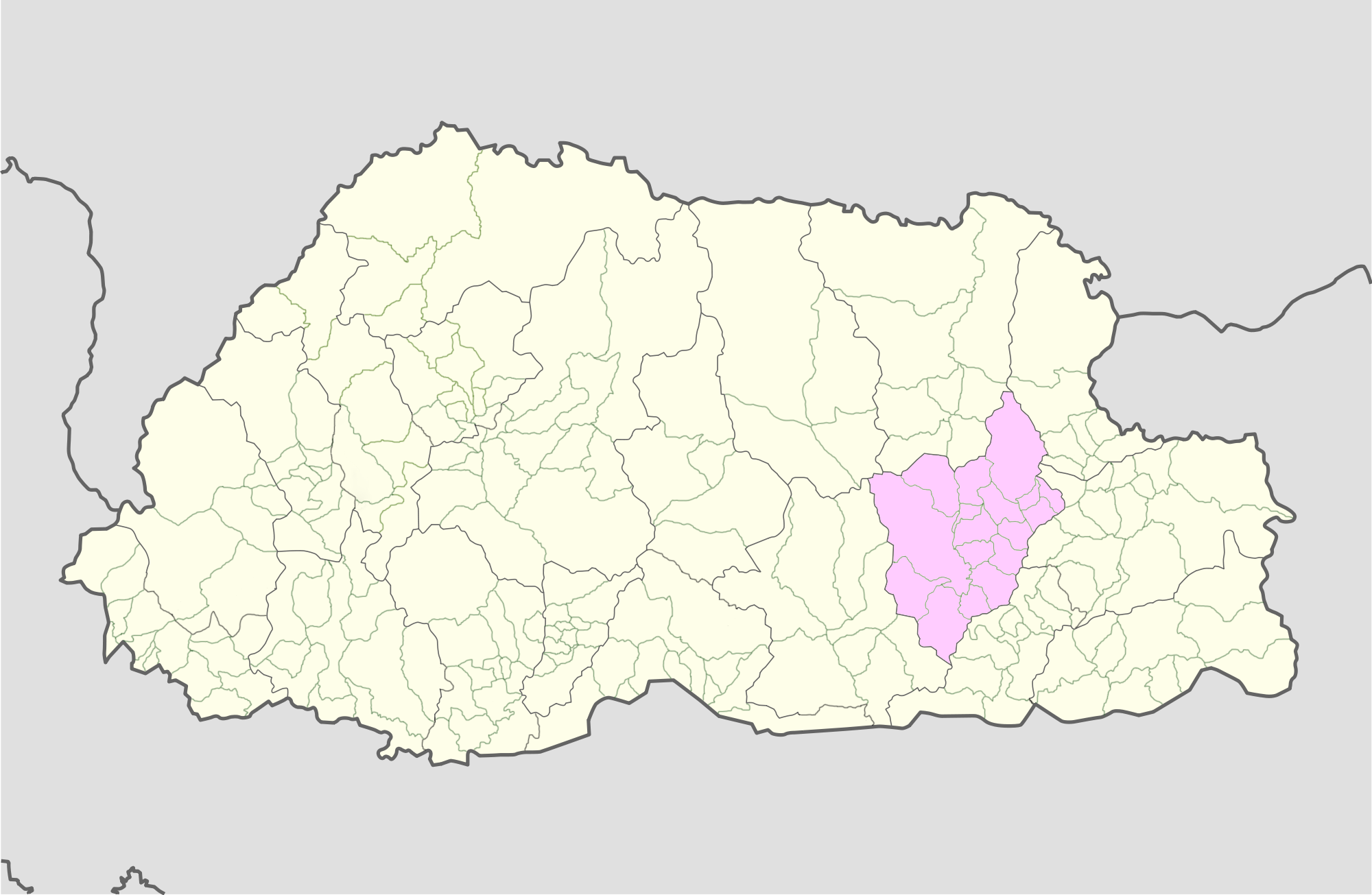
- Country: Bhutan
- District: Mongar District
- Time zone: UTC+6 (BTT)

Chaskhar Gewog (Dzongkha: ལྕགས་ས་མཁར་) is a gewog (village block) of Mongar District, Bhutan.
