= Chhali Gewog =

Chali Gewog ཆ་གླིང་
- Gewogs
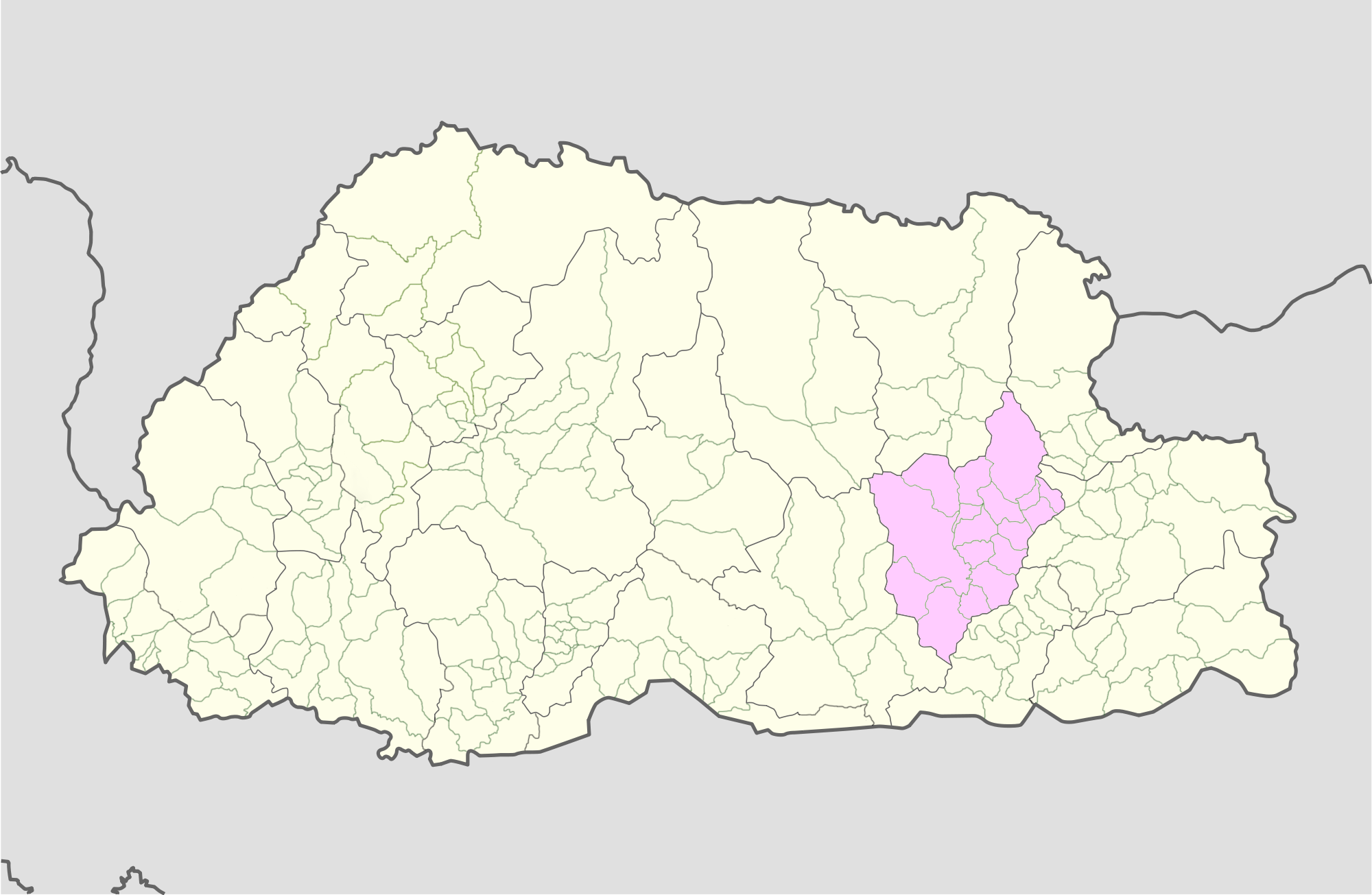
- Country: Bhutan
- District: Mongar District
- Time zone: UTC+6 (BTT)

Chhaling Gewog (Dzongkha: ཆ་གླིང་) is a gewog (village block) of Monggar District, Bhutan. In 2002, the gewog contained 263 households and covered an area of 42 square kilometres. As per the database of National Statistics Bureau there are 273 households as of 2024.

== Economy ==
The principal agricultural products are maize, paddy, barley, buckwheat, oranges and vegetables.

More than 60% of the population have access to piped drinking water supply and 30% of the households have electricity. The gewog has a community school with 258 students but relies on Mongar for most of the facilities. The farmers of Tashipong are dependent upon spring water.

The villagers mainly engage in subsistence farming but vegetable and animal products (such as cheese, butter and eggs) are sold at the market.

== Politics ==
Administratively, Chhali Gewog is a part of the dzongkhag of Mongar District. In November 2007, the people of Chhali elected former General Secretary of the Bhutan Olympic Committee Pema Tenzin as their National Council candidate.
