= Tsakaling Gewog =

Tsakaling Gewog ཙ་ཀ་གླིང་
- Gewogs
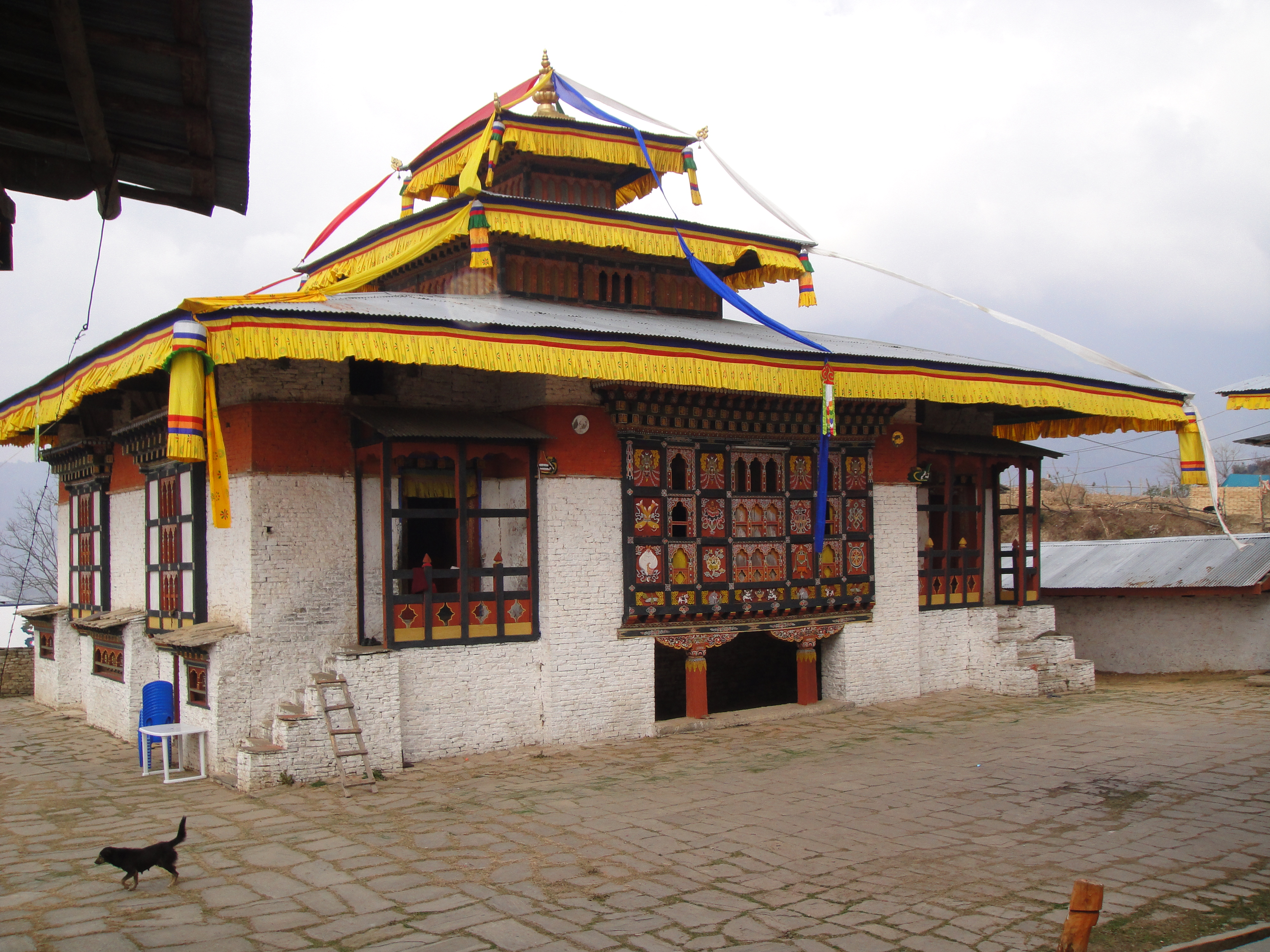
- Samten Chöling Temple, Tsakaling

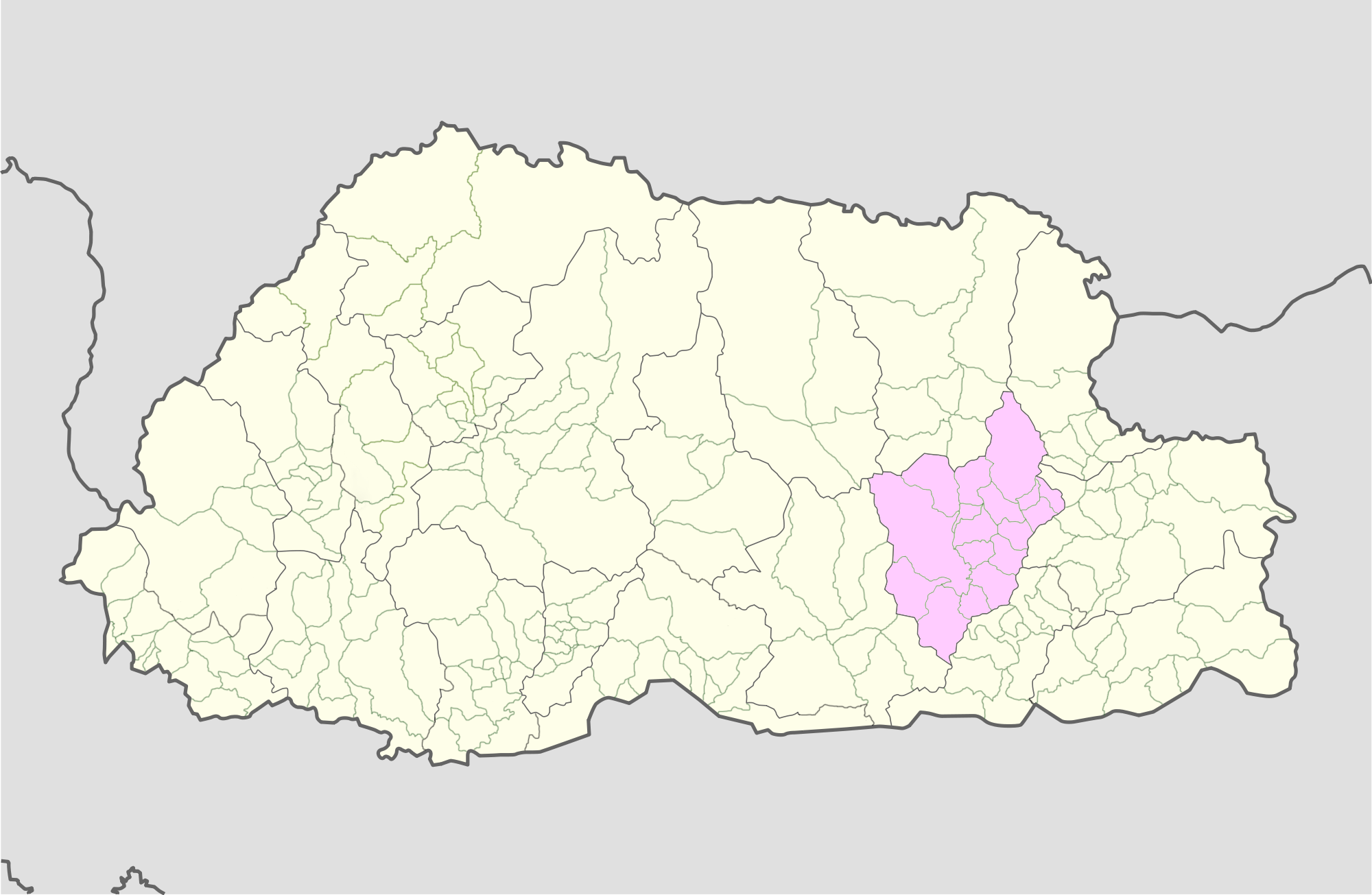
- Country: Bhutan
- District: Mongar District
- Time zone: UTC+6 (BTT)

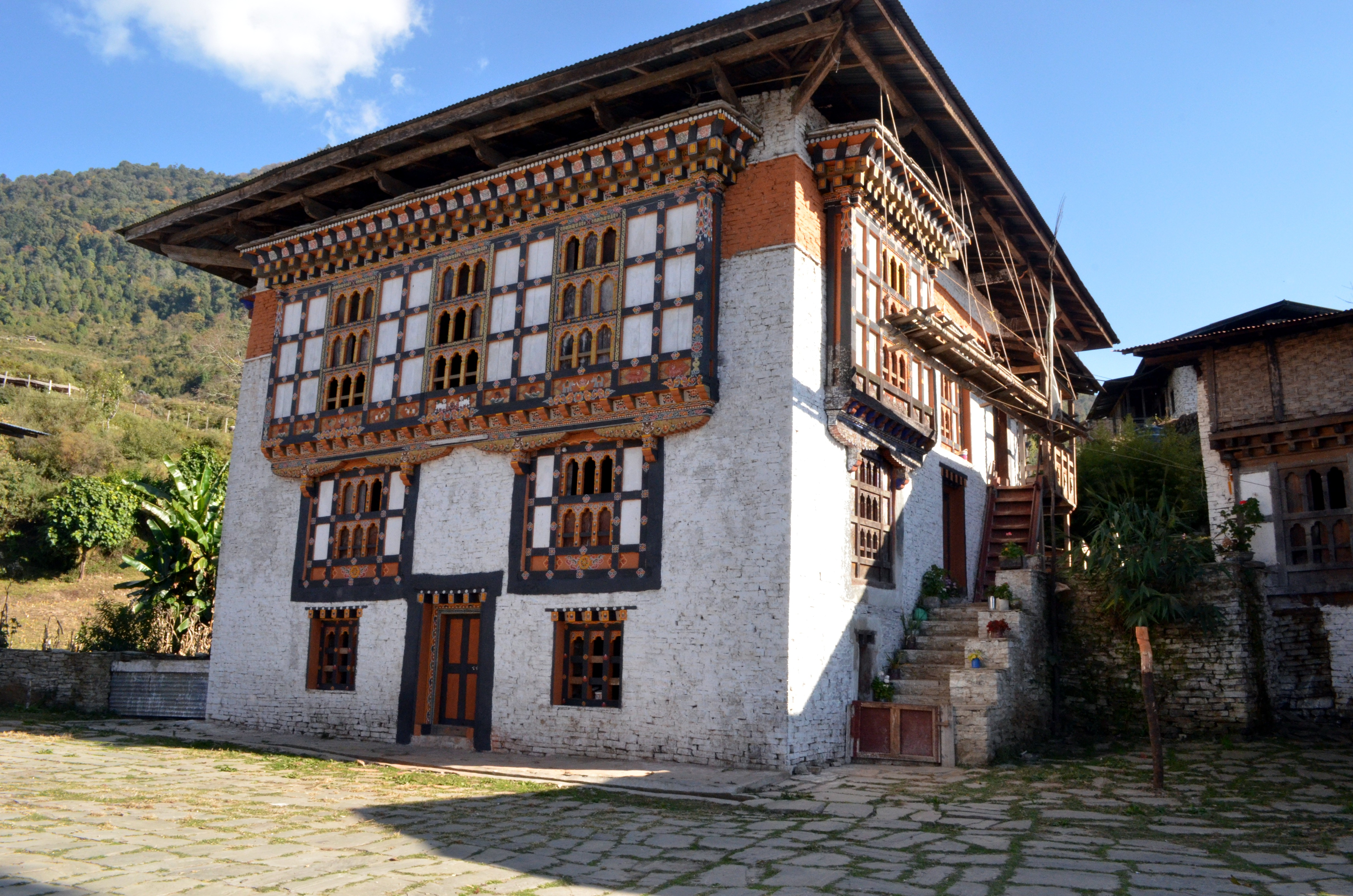
Tsakaling Naktsang

Tsakaling Gewog (Dzongkha: ཙ་ཀ་གླིང་) is a gewog (village block) of Mongar District, Bhutan. These gewog have an area of 72 km.sq with 362 household and 3469 population.
