= Narang Gewog =

Narang Gewog ན་རང་
- Gewogs
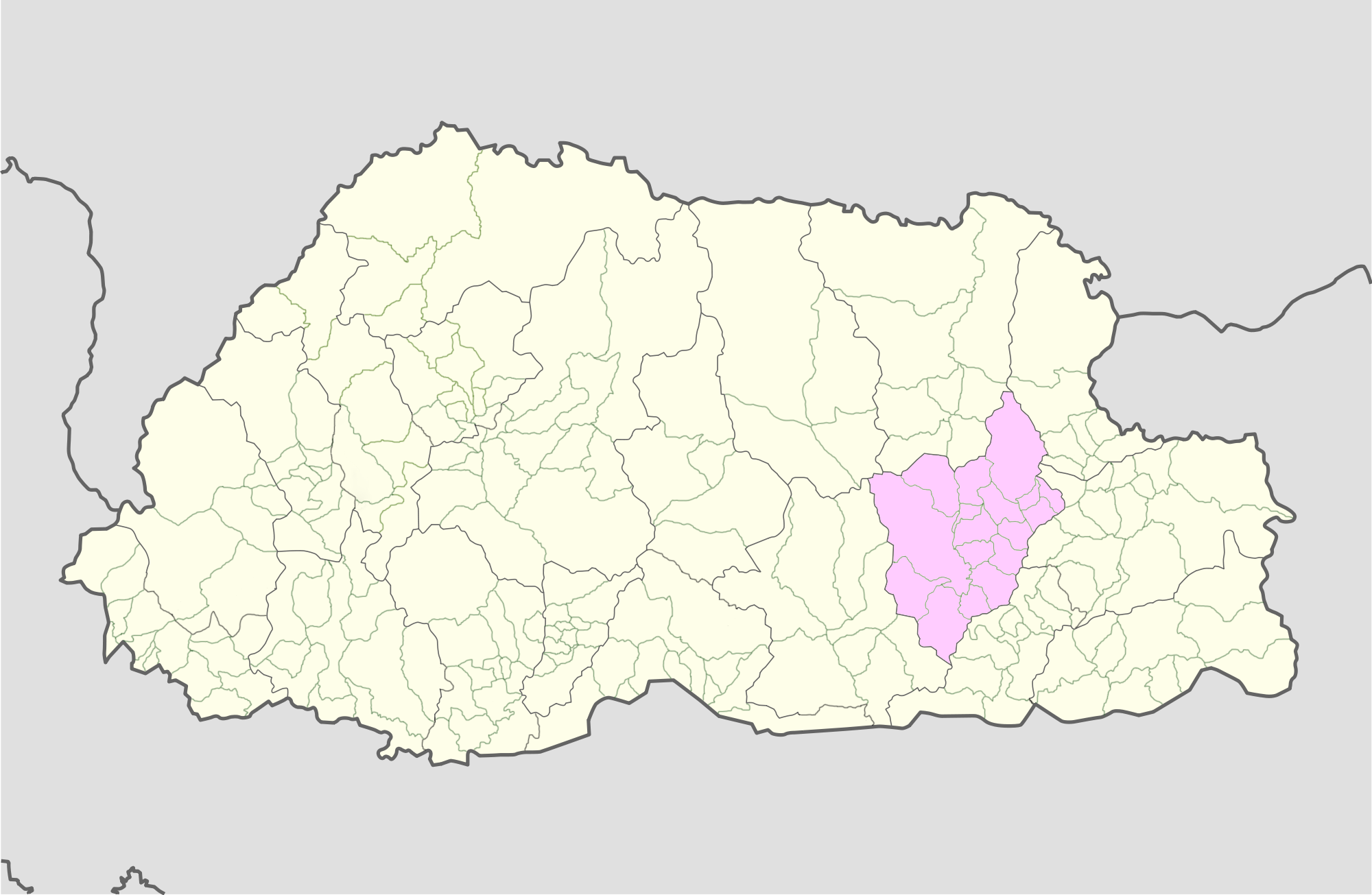
- Country: Bhutan
- District: Mongar District
- Time zone: UTC+6 (BTT)

Narang Gewog (Dzongkha: ན་རང་) is a gewog (village block) of Mongar District, Bhutan.
