= Thangrong Gewog =

Thangrong Gewog ཐང་རོང་
- Gewogs
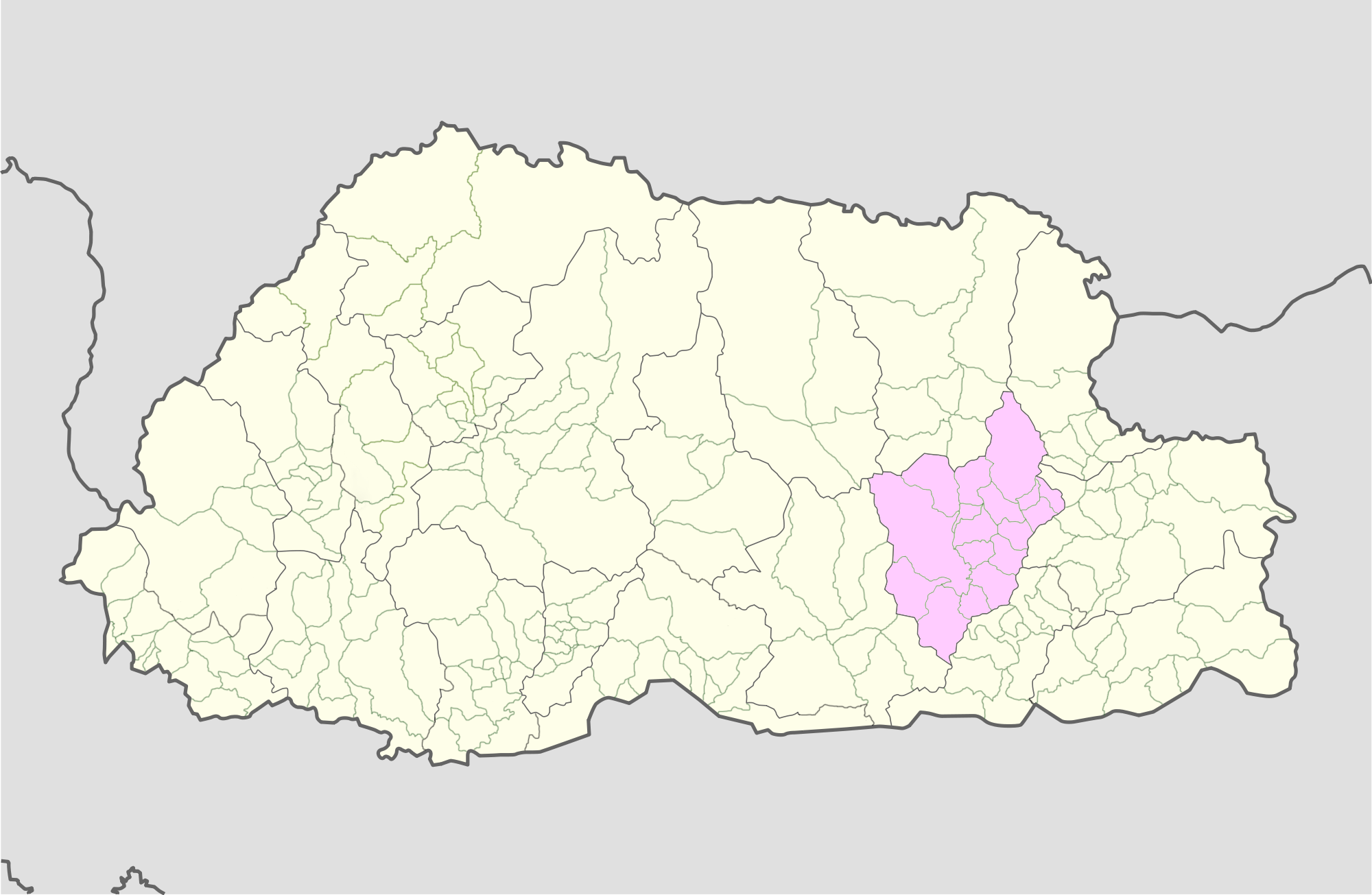
- Country: Bhutan
- District: Mongar District
- Time zone: UTC+6 (BTT)

Thangrong Gewog (Dzongkha: ཐང་རོང་) is a gewog (village block) of Mongar District, Bhutan.
