= Balam Gewog =

Balam Gewog བ་ལམ་
- Gewogs
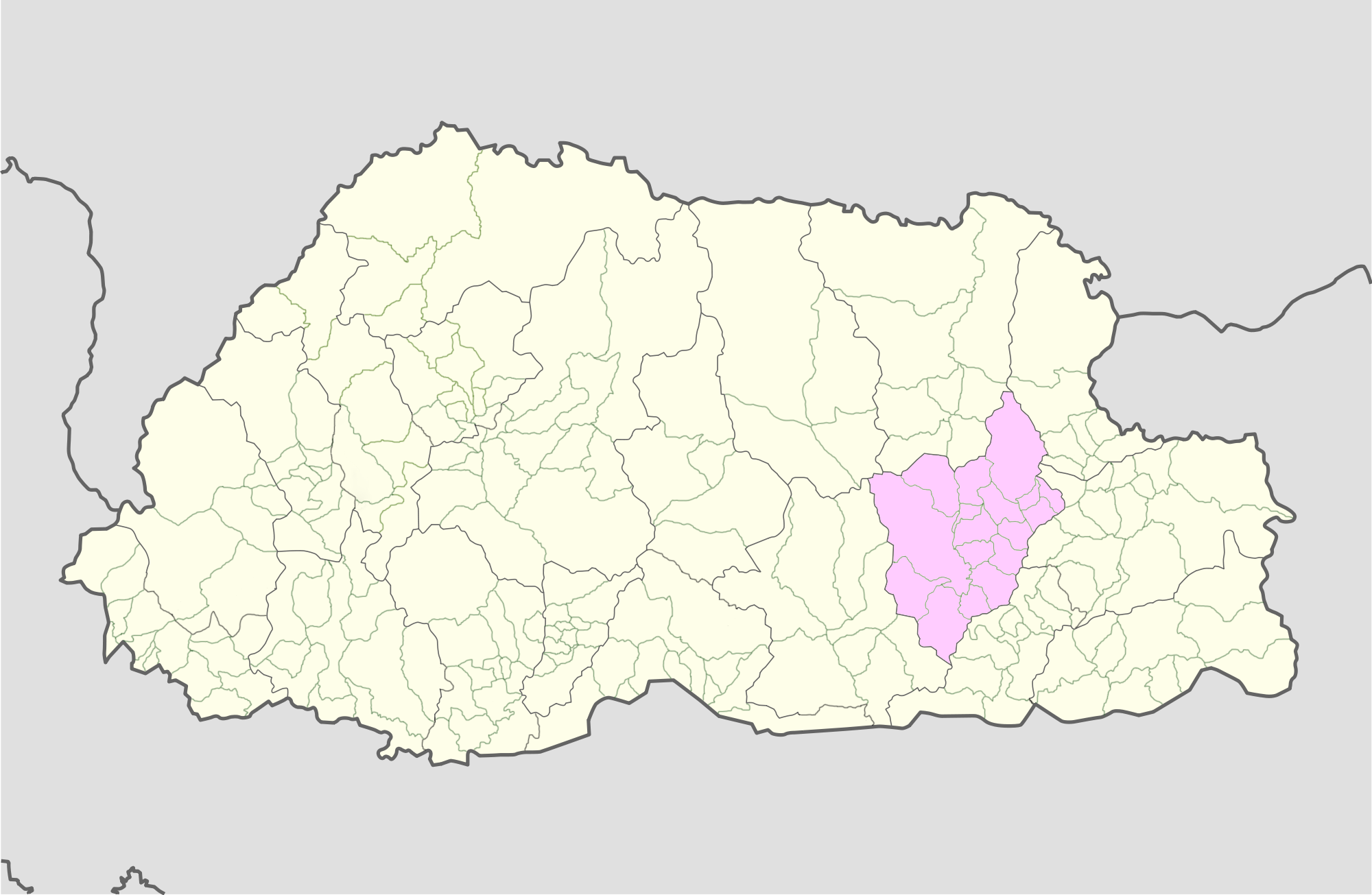
- Country: Bhutan
- District: Mongar District
- Time zone: UTC+6 (BTT)

Balam Gewog (Dzongkha: བ་ལམ་) is a gewog (village block) of Mongar District, Bhutan.
