= Mongar Gewog =

Mongar Gewog མོང་སྒར་
- Gewogs
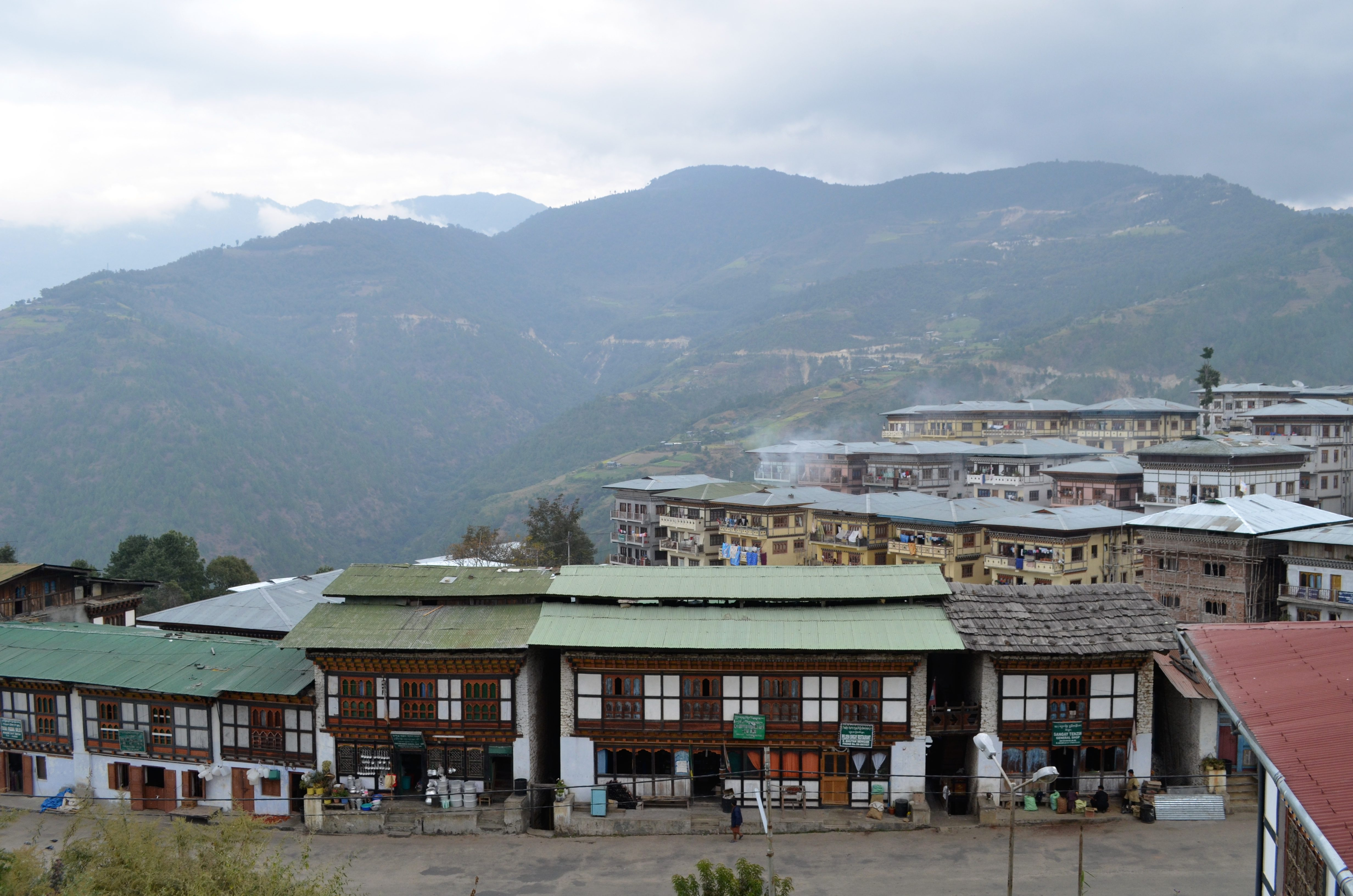
- A view of Mongar Town

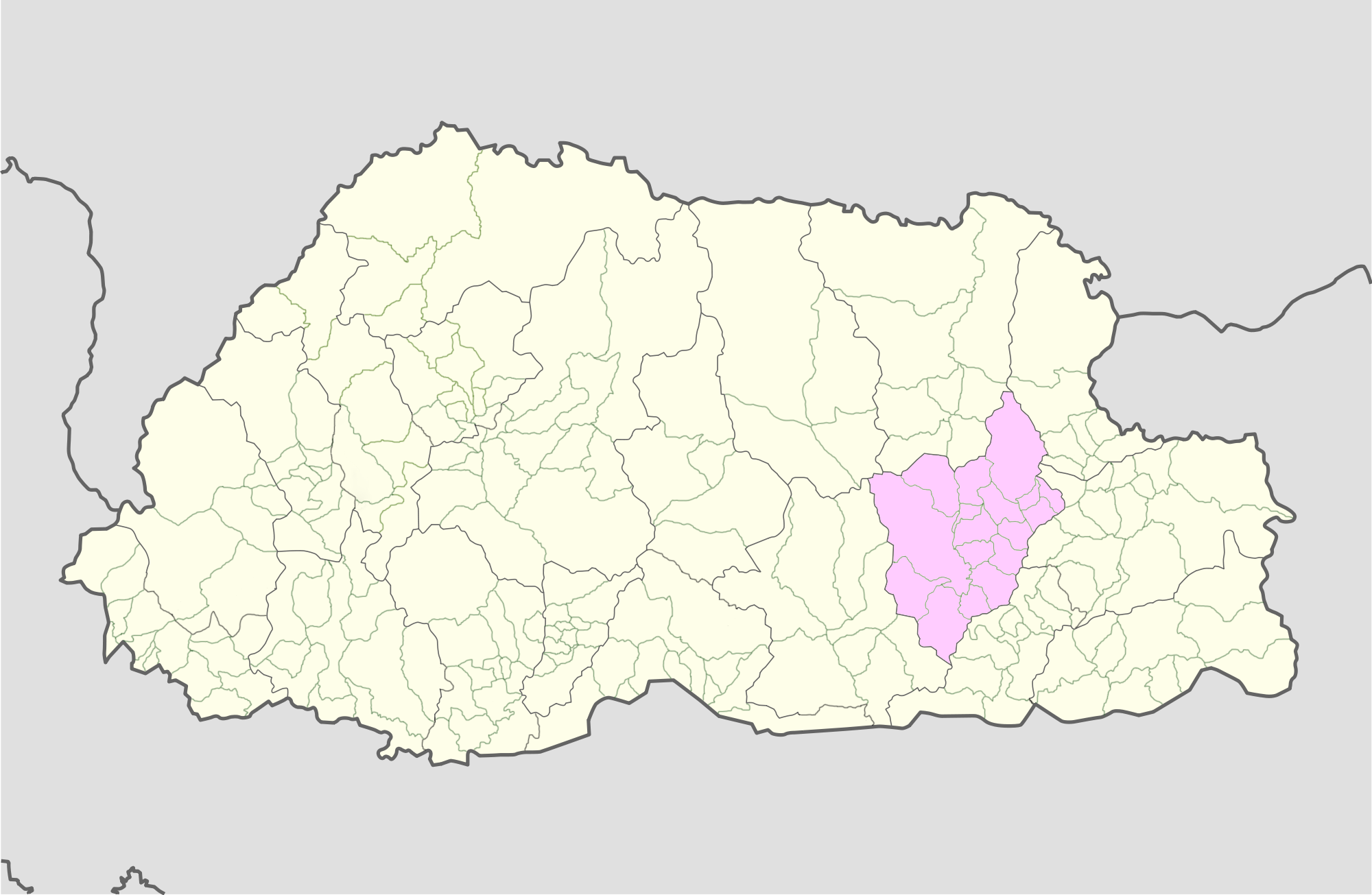
- Country: Bhutan
- District: Mongar District
- Time zone: UTC+6 (BTT)

Mongar Gewog (Dzongkha: མོང་སྒར་) is a gewog (village block) of Mongar District, Bhutan.
