= Shermuhoong Gewog =

Shemuhoong Gewog ཤེར་མུ་ཧཱུྃ་
- Gewogs
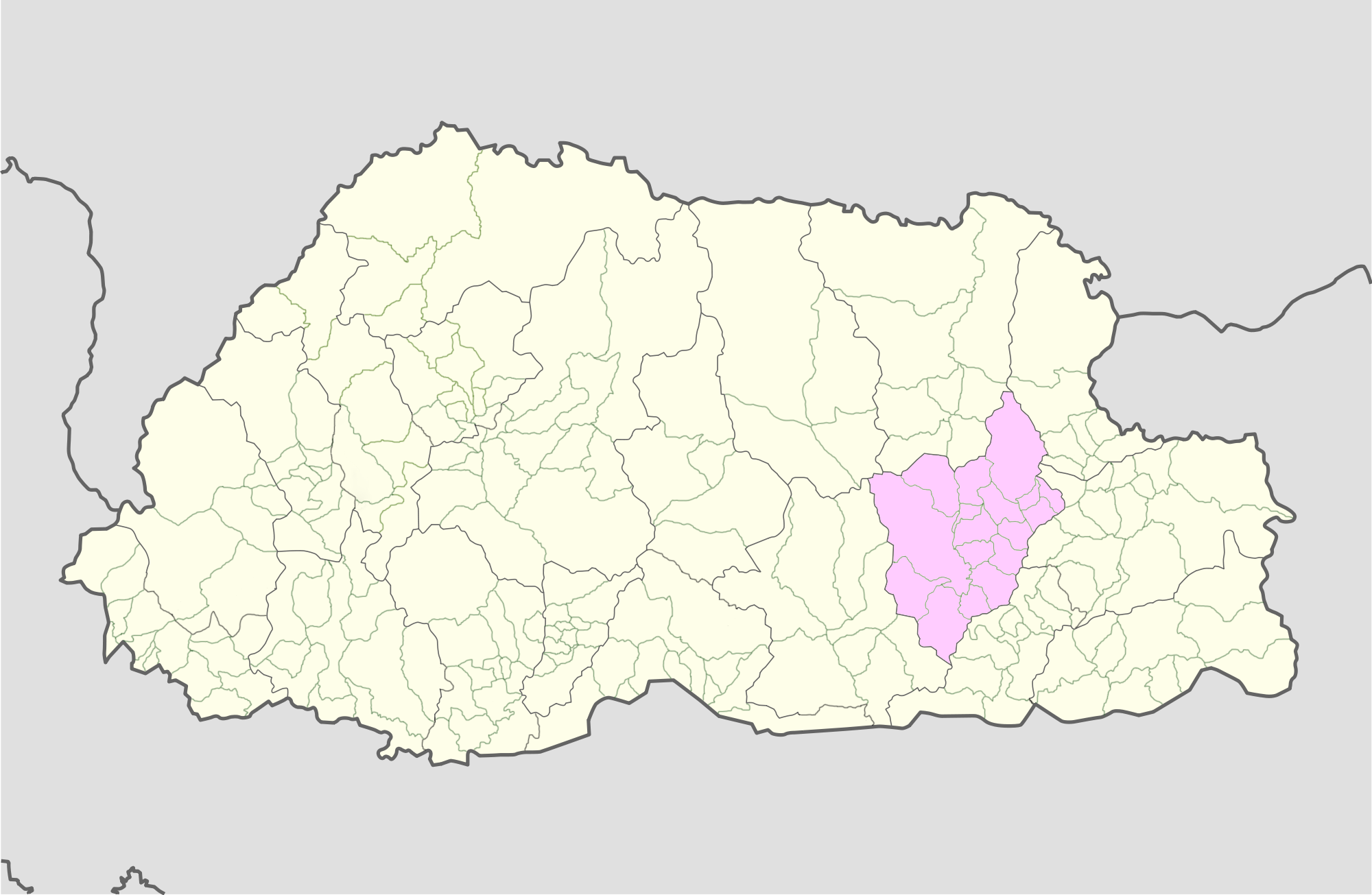
- Country: Bhutan
- District: Mongar District
- Time zone: UTC+6 (BTT)

Shermuhoong Gewog (Dzongkha: ཤེར་མུ་ཧཱུྃ་) is a gewog (village block) of Mongar District, Bhutan.
