= Tsamang Gewog =

Tsmang Gewog རྩ་མང་
- Gewogs
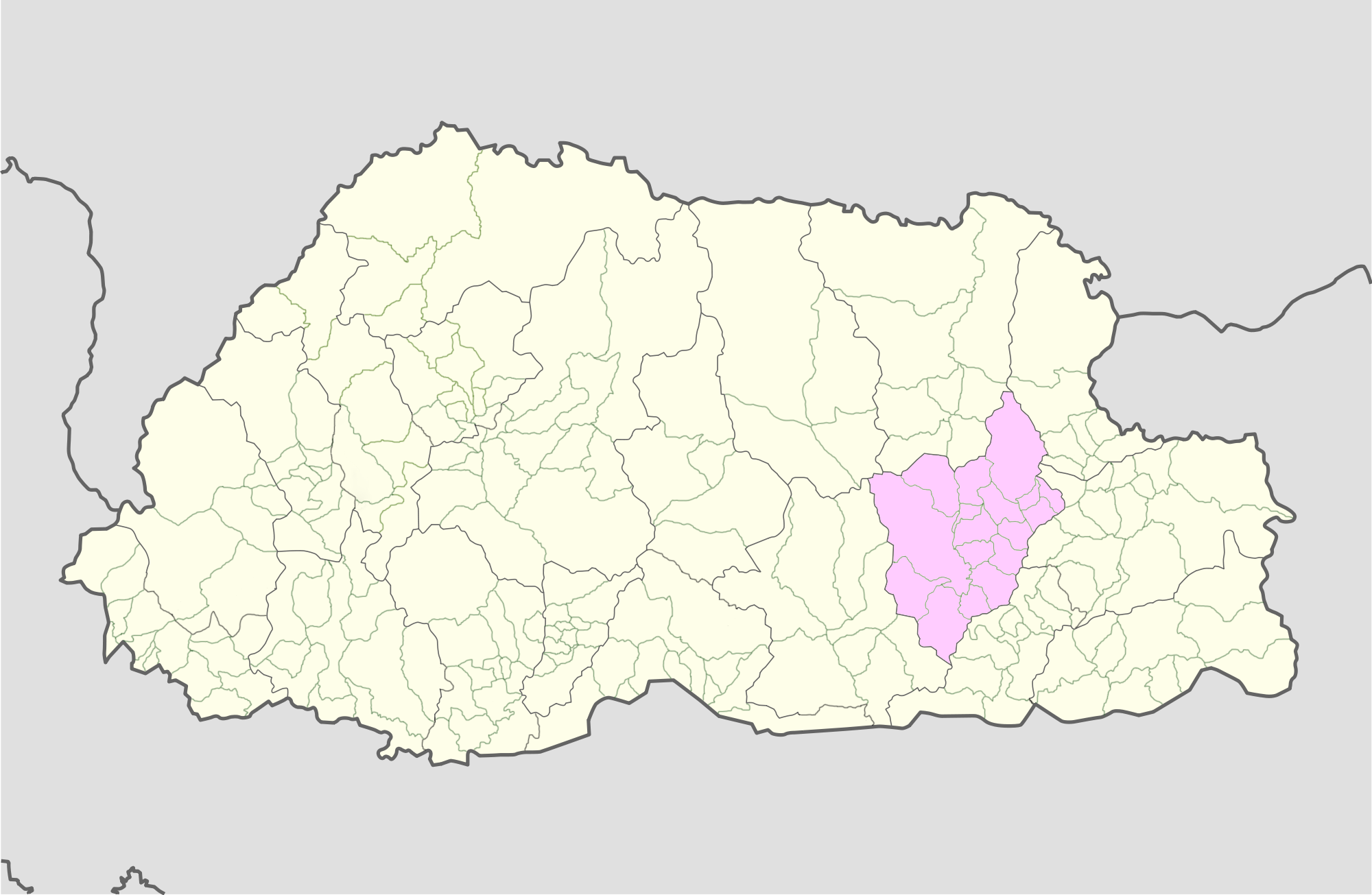
- Country: Bhutan
- District: Mongar District
- Time zone: UTC+6 (BTT)

Tsamang Gewog (Dzongkha: རྩ་མང་) is a gewog (village block) of Mongar District, Bhutan.
