= Silambi Gewog =

Silambi Gewog སི་ལམ་སྦི་
- Gewogs
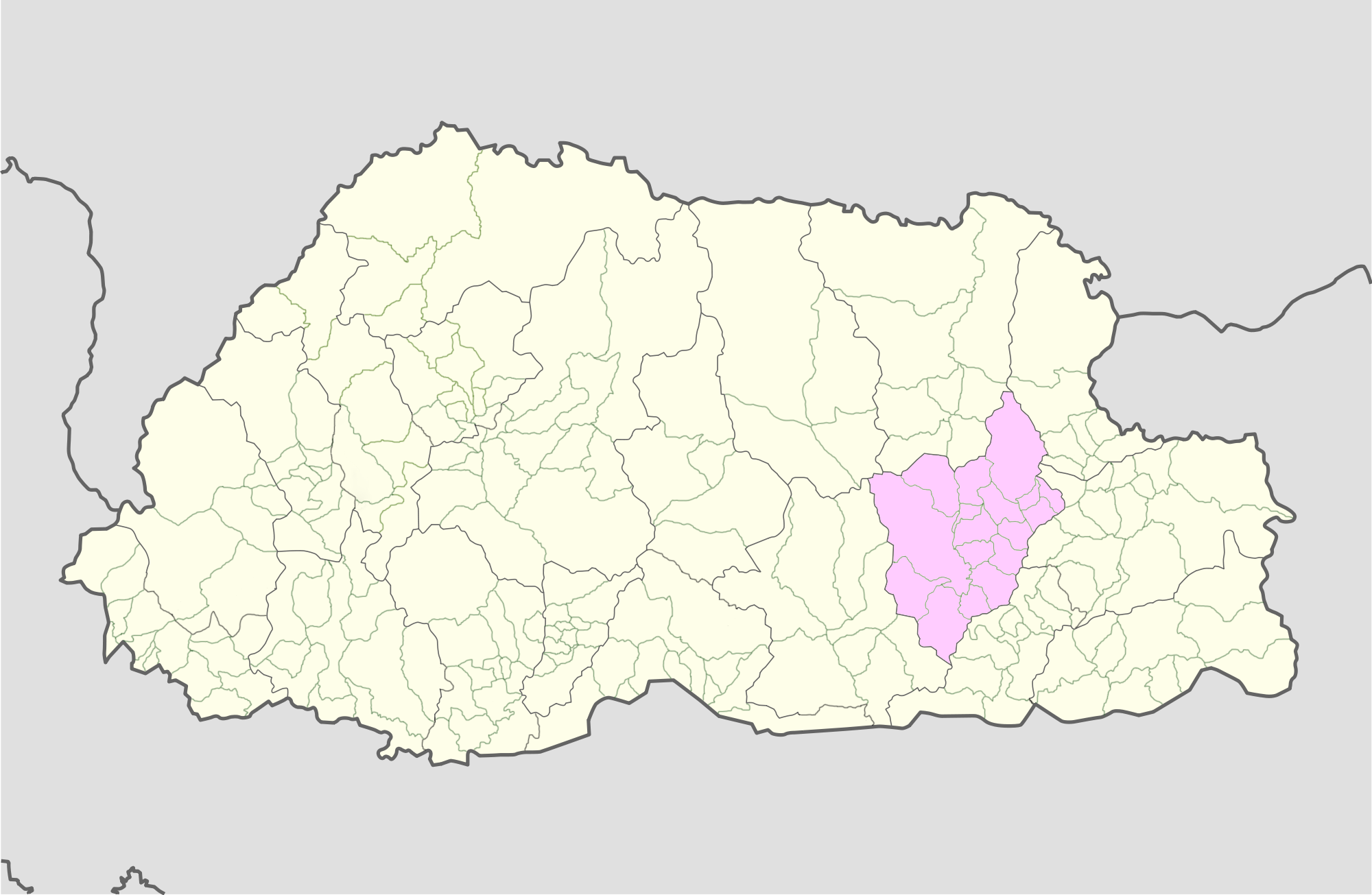
- Country: Bhutan
- District: Mongar District

Government
- Time zone: UTC+6 (BTT)

Silambi Gewog (Dzongkha: སི་ལམ་སྦི་) is a gewog (village block) of Mongar District, Bhutan.
