= Saling Gewog =

Saling Gewog ས་གླིང་
- Gewogs
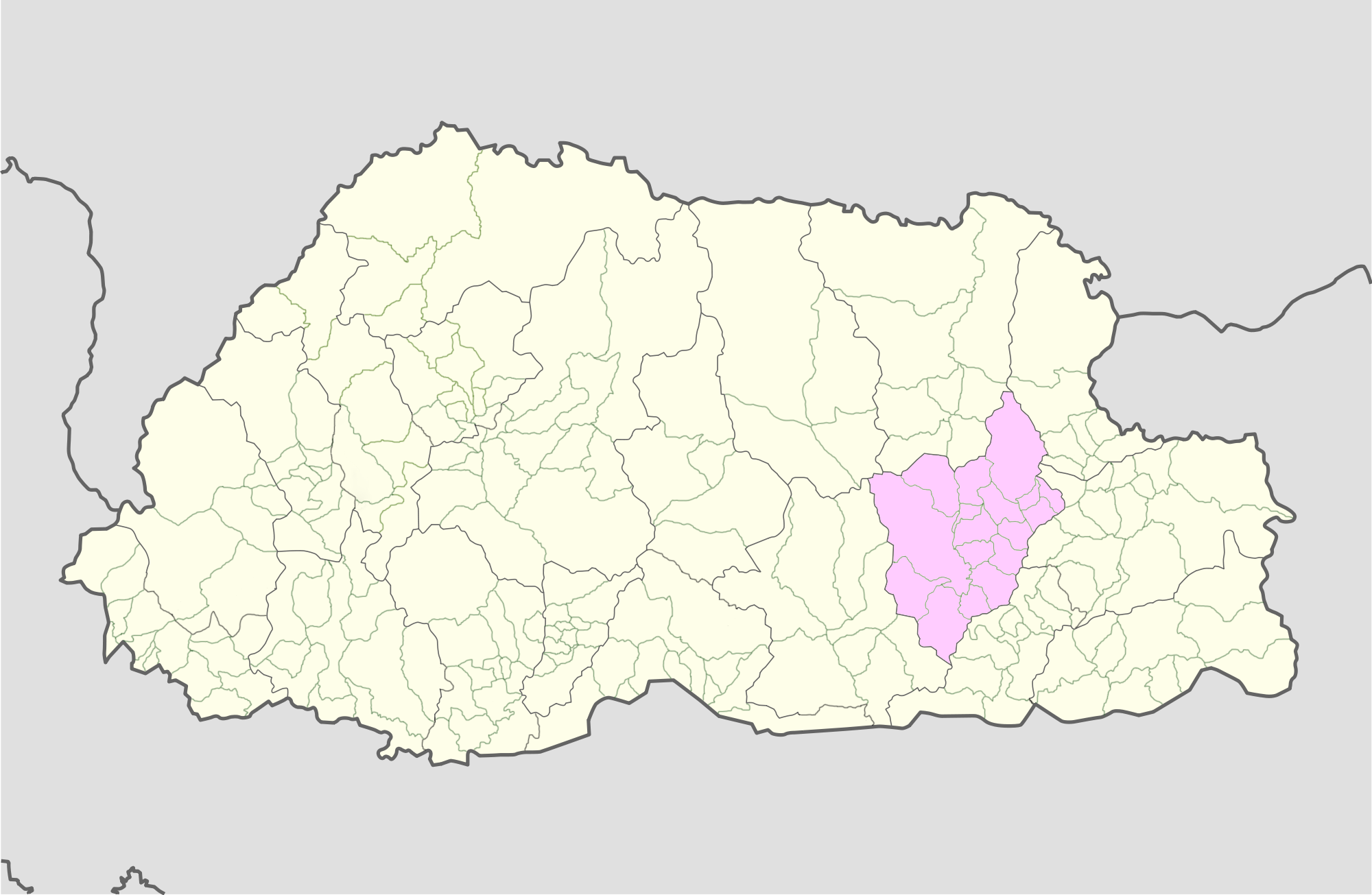
- Country: Bhutan
- District: Mongar District
- Time zone: UTC+6 (BTT)

Saling Gewog (Dzongkha: ས་གླིང་) is a gewog (village block) of Mongar District, Bhutan.
