= Kengkhar Gewog =

Kengkhar Gewog སྐྱེངས་མཁར་
- Gewogs
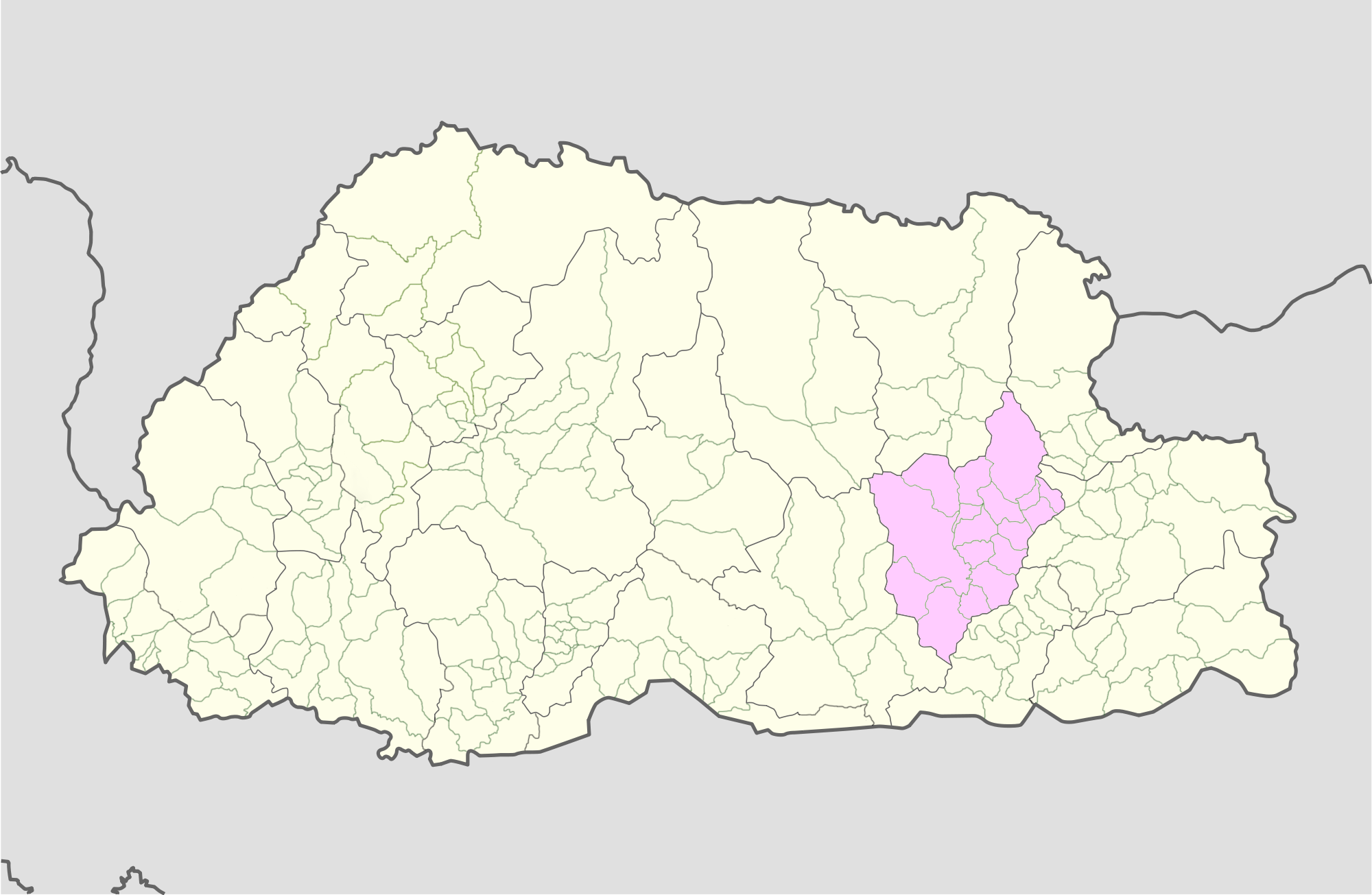
- Country: Bhutan
- District: Mongar District
- Time zone: UTC+6 (BTT)

Kengkhar Gewog (Dzongkha: སྐྱེངས་མཁར་) is a gewog (village block) of Mongar District, Bhutan.
