= Jurmey Gewog =

Jurmey Gewog འགྱུར་མེད་
- Gewogs
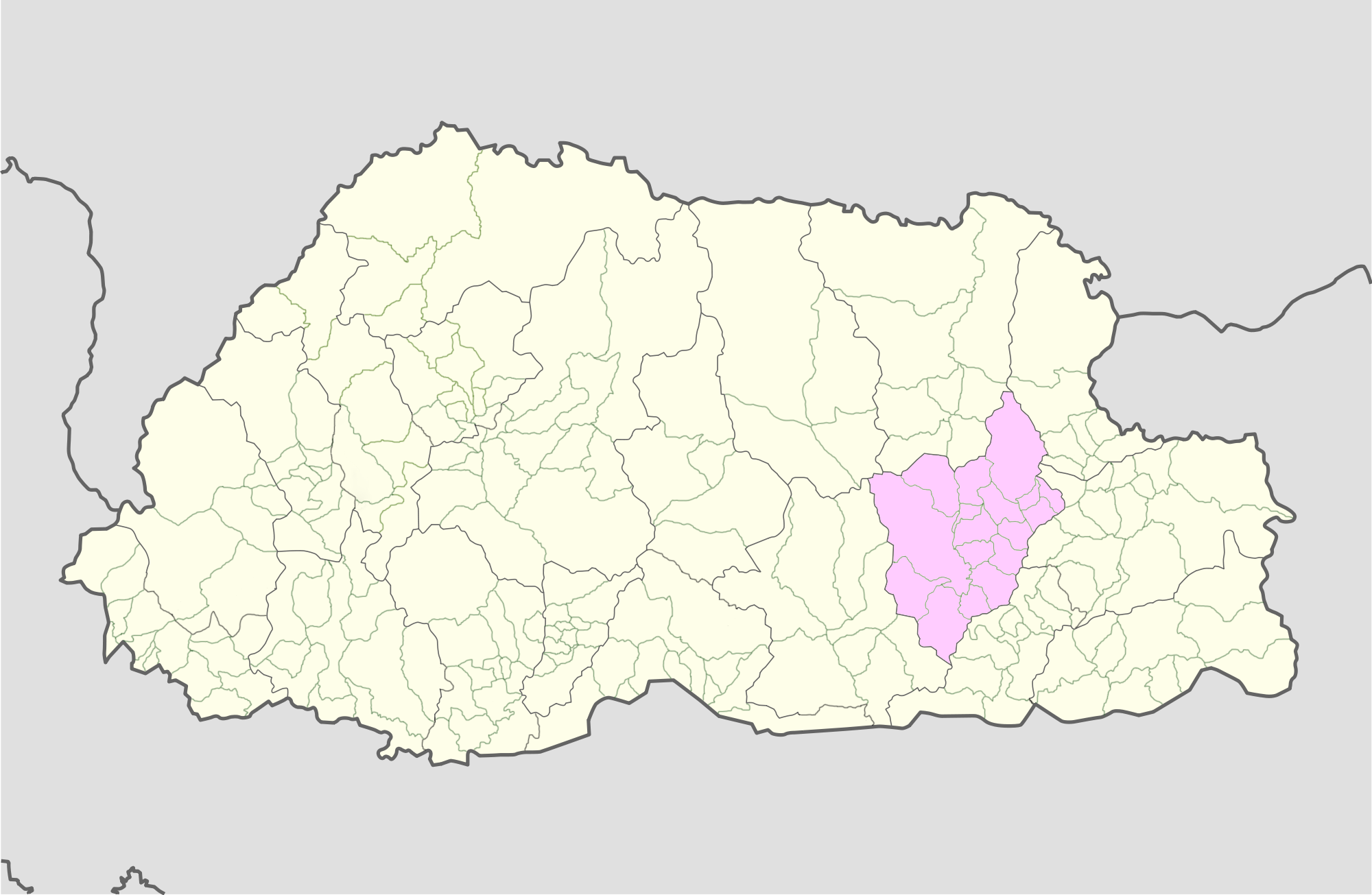
- Country: Bhutan
- District: Mongar District
- Time zone: UTC+6 (BTT)

Jurmey Gewog (Dzongkha: འགྱུར་མེད་) is a gewog (village block) of Mongar District, Bhutan.
