= Mongar District =

District of Bhutan

Coordinates: 27°10′N 91°10′E

Mongar District མོང་སྒར་རྫོང་ཁག།
- District
- Location of Mongar district within Bhutan
- Country: Bhutan
- Headquarters: Mongar

Area
  - Total: 2,859 km^{2} (1,104 sq mi)
- Elevation: 1,600 m (5,200 ft)

Population (2017)
  - Total: 37,150
  - Density: 12.99/km^{2} (33.65/sq mi)
- Time zone: UTC+6 (BTT)
- HDI (2019): 0.602 medium · 17th of 20
- Website: www.mongar.gov.bt

Mongar District (Dzongkha: མོང་སྒར་རྫོང་ཁག།; Wylie: Mong-sgar rdzong-khag) is one of the 20 dzongkhags (districts) comprising Bhutan. Mongar is the fastest-developing dzongkhag in eastern Bhutan. A regional hospital has been constructed and the region is bustling with many economic activities. Mongar is noted for its lemon grass, a plant that can be used to produce an essential oil. It also has a hydroelectric power-plant on the Kuri Chhu river. Mongar is notable for having the longest work time in all the dzongkhags of Bhutan.

== Languages ==
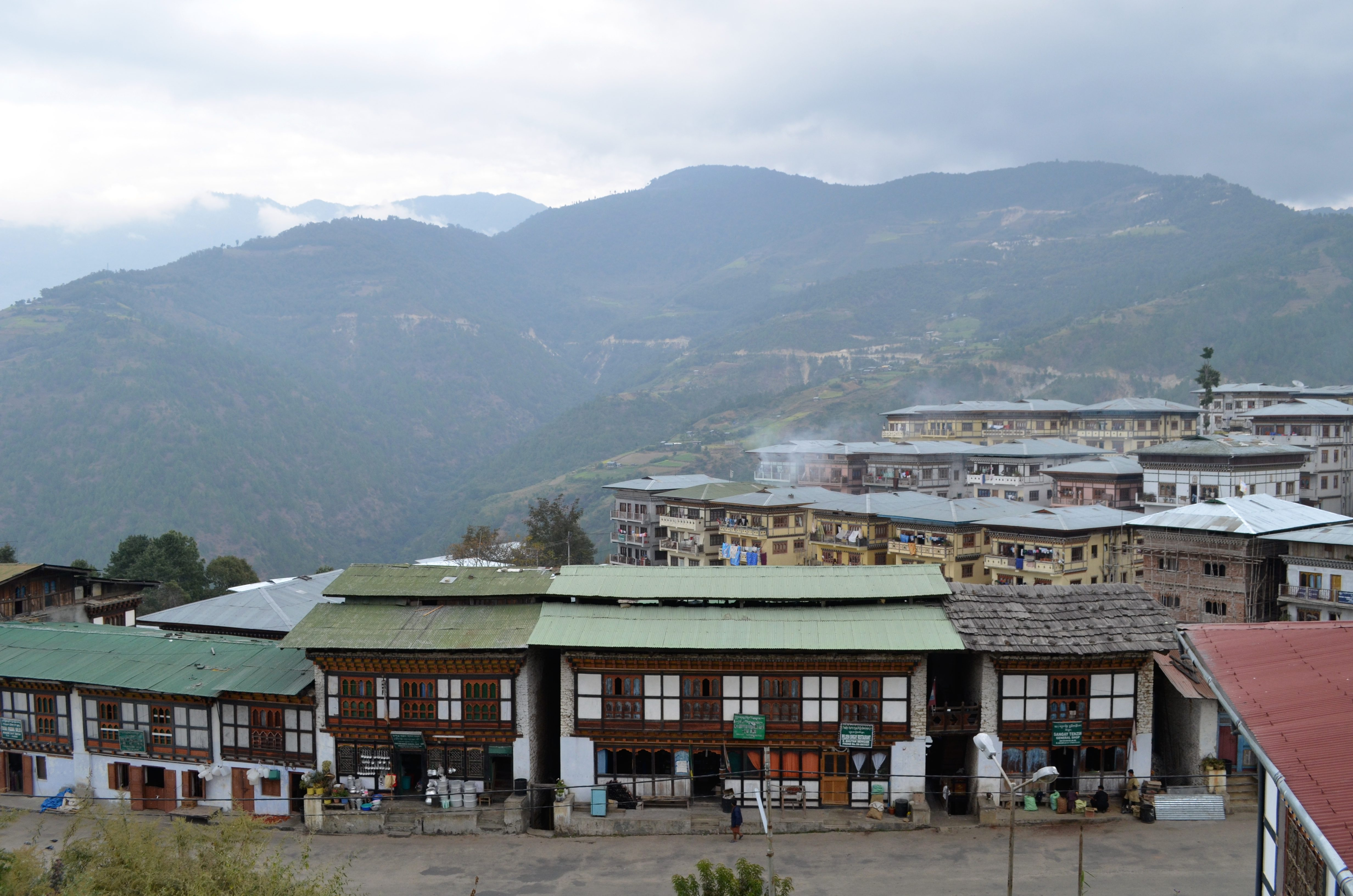
View of Mongar town

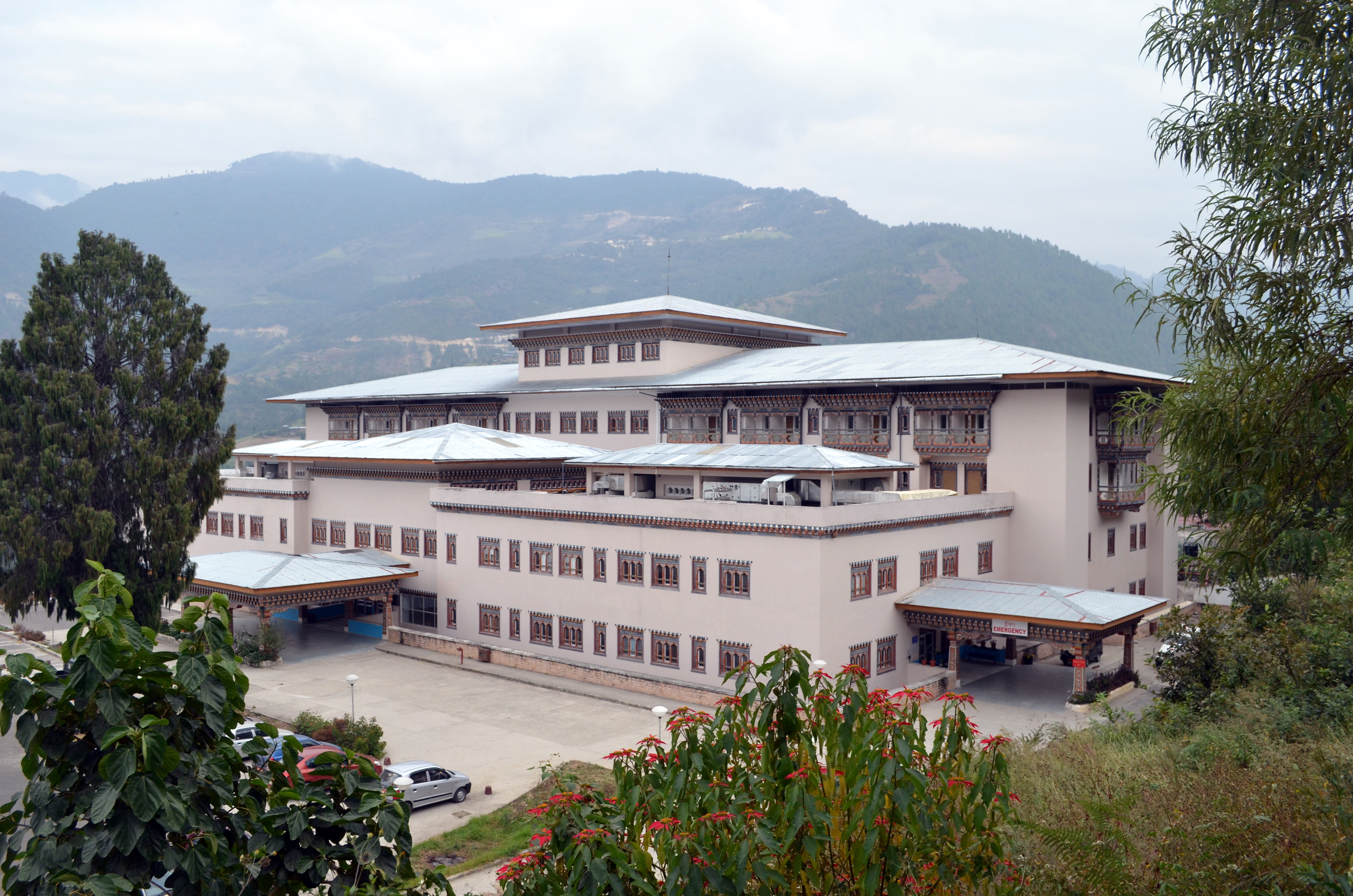
Regional Referral Hospital, Mongar

Mongar is home to a variety of Bhutanese languages and dialects. In the east, the East Bodish Tshangla (Sharchopkha) is the dominant language, also used as a regional lingua franca.

Central Mongar is the only region where the East Bodish Chali language is spoken, by about at total of 8,200 people in Wangmakhar, Gorsum and Tormazhong villages, mainly in and around Chhali Gewog on the east bank of the Kuri Chhu River. Some people from Tormazhong speaks kurteop too.

Southern Mongar is likewise unique for its 1,000 Gongduk speakers living in a few inaccessible villages of Gongdue Gewog near the Kuri Chhu river. The language appears to be the sole representative of a unique branch of the Tibeto-Burman language family and retains the complex verbal agreement system of Proto-Tibeto-Burman.

In southwestern Mongar, residents speak Khengkha, an East Bodish language closely related to Bumthangkha languages including Kurtöp. Bumthangkha itself is also spoken by the natives of extreme northwest Mongar. Residents of the Kuri Chhu valley of northern Mongar speak Chochangachakha language, a Central Bodish language very closely related to Dzongkha, the national language.

== Administrative divisions ==
Mongar District is divided into seventeen village blocks (or gewogs):

- Balam Gewog
- Chaskhar Gewog
- Chhali Gewog
- Drametse Gewog
- Drepung Gewog
- Gongdue Gewog
- Jurmey Gewog
- Kengkhar Gewog
- Mongar Gewog
- Narang Gewog
- Ngatshang Gewog
- Saleng Gewog
- Sherimung Gewog
- Silambi Gewog
- Thangrong Gewog
- Tsakaling Gewog
- Tsamang Gewog

== Geography ==
The western Mongar District contains part of the Thrumshingla National Park (the gewogs of Saling and the Tsamang) and the northeastern Mongar District contains part of the Bumdeling Wildlife Sanctuary (the gewog of Sharmung).

The Kuri Chhu river flows through the Mongar District valley. The Kuri Chhu, a major river of eastern Bhutan, is a tributary of the Manas River system, which is the largest river in Bhutan and a major tributary of the Brahmaputra River, the waterway that drains most of the eastern region.

== Tourism ==
- Aja Ney
- Thekchok Namdrol Ugyen Choeling Dratshang, Drametse
- Drakar Choeling Goenpa, Larjab
- Nga Gyur Tsakaling Samten Choeling Gomdey
- Aja Menchu
- Nagtshang, Wengkhar
- Sa Nga Choeling Lhakhang, Yakgang

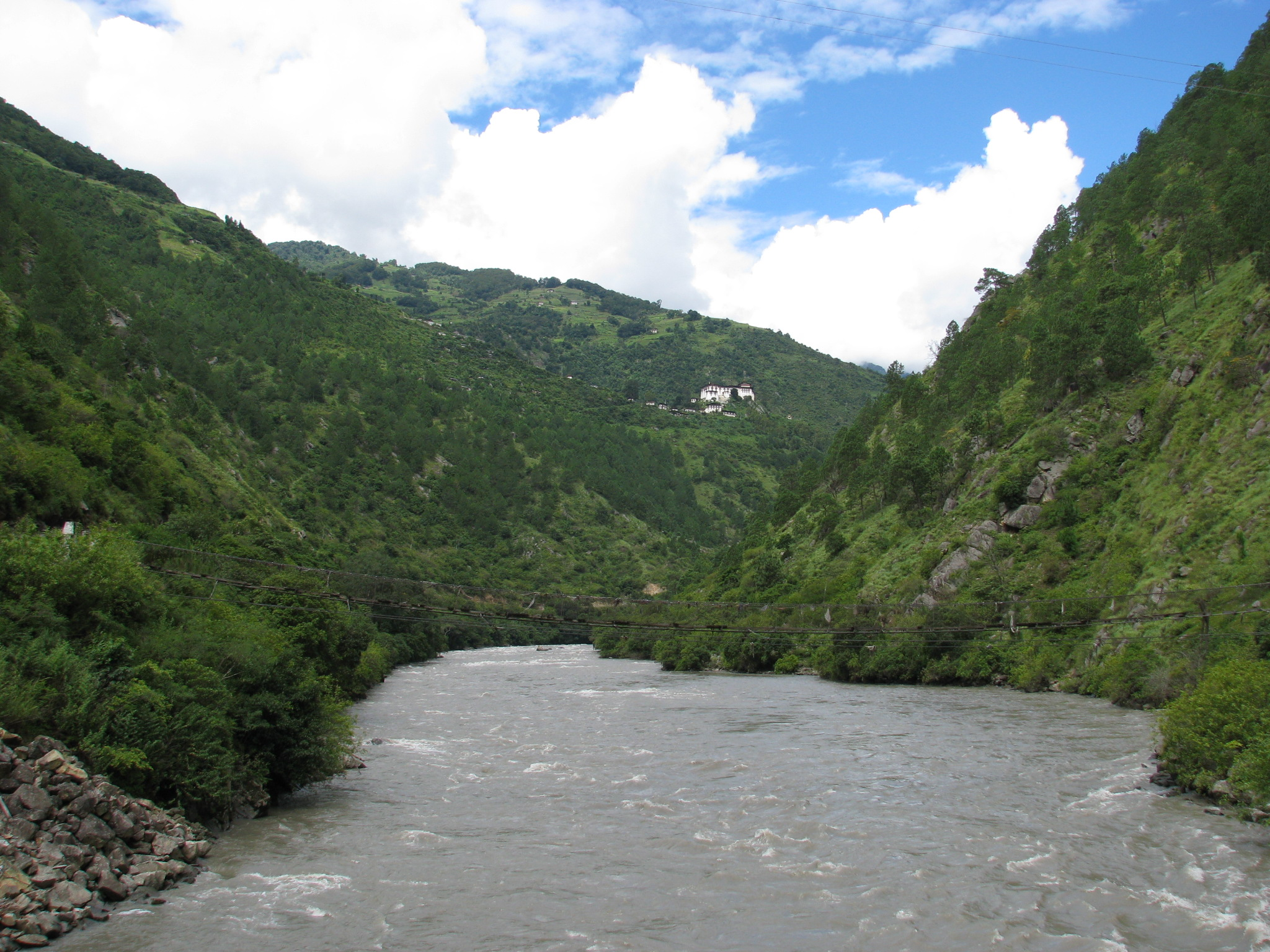
Kuri Chhu River

== Climate ==
Climate data for Mongar, elevation 1,600 m (5,200 ft), (1996–2017 normals)
| Month | Jan | Feb | Mar | Apr | May | Jun | Jul | Aug | Sep | Oct | Nov | Dec | Year |
|---|---|---|---|---|---|---|---|---|---|---|---|---|---|
| Record high °C (°F) | 22.0 (71.6) | 25.5 (77.9) | 30.0 (86.0) | 30.0 (86.0) | 34.0 (93.2) | 33.0 (91.4) | 33.0 (91.4) | 34.0 (93.2) | 32.0 (89.6) | 31.5 (88.7) | 27.0 (80.6) | 22.5 (72.5) | 34.0 (93.2) |
| Mean daily maximum °C (°F) | 16.7 (62.1) | 19.1 (66.4) | 21.9 (71.4) | 23.6 (74.5) | 25.5 (77.9) | 26.6 (79.9) | 26.7 (80.1) | 27.3 (81.1) | 26.4 (79.5) | 24.4 (75.9) | 20.8 (69.4) | 17.8 (64.0) | 23.1 (73.5) |
| Daily mean °C (°F) | 11.3 (52.3) | 13.3 (55.9) | 16.3 (61.3) | 18.4 (65.1) | 20.4 (68.7) | 22.1 (71.8) | 22.4 (72.3) | 22.7 (72.9) | 21.8 (71.2) | 19.1 (66.4) | 15.4 (59.7) | 12.5 (54.5) | 18.0 (64.3) |
| Mean daily minimum °C (°F) | 5.8 (42.4) | 7.5 (45.5) | 10.6 (51.1) | 13.1 (55.6) | 15.2 (59.4) | 17.6 (63.7) | 18.1 (64.6) | 18.1 (64.6) | 17.1 (62.8) | 13.7 (56.7) | 10.0 (50.0) | 7.2 (45.0) | 12.8 (55.1) |
| Record low °C (°F) | −1.0 (30.2) | −1.0 (30.2) | 5.0 (41.0) | 7.0 (44.6) | 11.0 (51.8) | 13.0 (55.4) | 14.0 (57.2) | 15.0 (59.0) | 13.0 (55.4) | 8.0 (46.4) | 4.0 (39.2) | 2.0 (35.6) | −1.0 (30.2) |
| Average rainfall mm (inches) | 6.0 (0.24) | 11.3 (0.44) | 36.3 (1.43) | 82.7 (3.26) | 93.1 (3.67) | 132.7 (5.22) | 196.0 (7.72) | 161.2 (6.35) | 113.0 (4.45) | 75.9 (2.99) | 3.5 (0.14) | 2.7 (0.11) | 914.4 (36.02) |
| Average rainy days | 0.9 | 1.6 | 5.4 | 9.0 | 9.7 | 13.1 | 16.8 | 14.4 | 10.4 | 4.4 | 0.9 | 0.8 | 87.4 |
| Average relative humidity (%) | 70.1 | 71.4 | 70.6 | 74.9 | 77.2 | 83.5 | 86.1 | 84.5 | 84.3 | 75.6 | 70.0 | 69.6 | 76.5 |
Source 1: National Center for Hydrology and Meteorology
Source 2: World Meteorological Organization (rainy days 1996–2018)

== See also ==
- Districts of Bhutan
- Kurtoed Province
- Kurmaed Province
- Thrumshing La
- Kuri Chhu
