= 2018 Bhutanese National Council election =

- 20 April 2018
- All 20 seats in the National Council; 11 seats needed for a majority
- Turnout: 54.29%
Chairperson before	Chairperson after
Namgay Penjor; Independent	Tashi Dorji; Independent

National Council elections were held in Bhutan on 20 April 2018.

== Electoral system ==
Twenty of the 25 members of the National Council are elected from single-member constituencies using first-past-the-post voting.

== Results ==
Dzongkhag	Candidate	Votes	%	Notes
Bumthang	Nima	3,513	59.22	Re-elected
Bumthang	Kencho Tshering	2,419	40.78	
Chukha	Sangay Dorji	5,079	33.71	Elected
Chukha	Hem Kumar Ghalley	3,534	23.46	
Chukha	Tshewang Lhamo	2,458	16.31	
Chukha	Kinlay Dorji	1,725	11.45	
Chukha	Pema Tenzin	1,586	10.53	Unseated
Chukha	Damcho Gyeltshen	684	4.54	
Dagana	Surjaman Thapa	2,636	18.89	Elected
Dagana	Birendra Chimoria	2,394	17.15	
Dagana	Dawa Rigyel	1,975	14.15	
Dagana	Kinzang Gyaltshen	1,115	7.99	
Dagana	Tenzin Samdrup	1,107	7.93	
Dagana	Suraj Pradhan	1,091	7.82	
Dagana	San Man Gurung	1,060	7.59	
Dagana	Birkha Bdr. Subba	925	6.63	
Dagana	Sangay Thinley	853	6.11	
Dagana	Wangdi	801	5.74	
Gasa	Dorji Khandu	547	36.20	Elected
Gasa	Phurb Dorji	528	34.94	
Gasa	Kinley Dorji	436	28.86	
Haa	Ugyen Namgay	1,730	34.20	Elected
Haa	Tshering Dorji	1,573	31.09	Unseated
Haa	Ngawang Tobgay	994	19.65	
Haa	Tobgay	762	15.06	
Lhuntse	Tempa Dorji	2,569	32.58	Re-elected
Lhuntse	Rinzin Rinzin	2,149	27.25	
Lhuntse	Jurme Tenzin	1,378	17.48	
Lhuntse	Kinga Penjor	1,043	13.23	
Lhuntse	Tenzin Jurmey	746	9.46	
Mongar	Sonam Pelzom	2,406	13.47	Elected
Mongar	Tshering Wangchen	2,234	12.51	
Mongar	Sonam Wangchuk	2,129	11.92	Unseated
Mongar	Naichu	2,097	11.74	
Mongar	Jamyang Loday	1,509	8.45	
Mongar	Yeshi Lhendup	1,436	8.04	
Mongar	Pema Dorji	1,304	7.30	
Mongar	Neten	1,219	6.82	
Mongar	Rinchen Dorji	1,052	5.89	
Mongar	Ugyen Dorji	704	3.94	
Mongar	Chimi Dorji	673	3.77	
Mongar	Tshering Penjor	589	3.30	
Mongar	Ugyen Tshering	511	2.86	
Paro	Ugyen Tshering	4,763	43.41	Elected
Paro	Sonam Tashi	2,491	22.70	
Paro	Dawchu	1,101	10.03	
Paro	Ugyen Dorji	985	8.98	
Paro	Jangchub Dorji	945	8.61	
Paro	Chencho Dorji	688	6.27	
Pemagatshel	Choining Dorji	3,846	30.21	Elected
Pemagatshel	Sonam Dhendup	3,583	28.14	
Pemagatshel	Sherig Dentshog	2,133	16.75	
Pemagatshel	Sangay Wangchuk	1,821	14.30	
Pemagatshel	Jamtsho	1,349	10.60	
Punakha	Lhaki Dolma	2,333	23.29	Elected
Punakha	Tshencho Wangdi	1,511	15.08	
Punakha	Namgay Wangchuk	1,471	14.68	
Punakha	Sonam	1,267	12.65	
Punakha	Kinley Wangchuk	1,207	12.05	
Punakha	Dechen Zangmo	995	9.93	
Punakha	Dechen Thaiye Dorji	727	7.26	
Punakha	Rinchen Dorji	507	5.06	
Samdrup Jongkhar	Jigme Wangchuk	4,101	30.18	Re-elected
Samdrup Jongkhar	Kelzang Phuntsho	2,989	22.00	
Samdrup Jongkhar	Tshelthrim Dukar	2,674	19.68	
Samdrup Jongkhar	Ugyen Dorji	1,635	12.03	
Samdrup Jongkhar	Tshewang Tenzin	1,105	8.13	
Samdrup Jongkhar	Sangay Tenzin	1,085	7.98	
Samtse	Tirtha Man Rai	6,243	25.03	Elected
Samtse	Dhan Kumar Ghalley	4,829	19.36	
Samtse	Ugyen Lama	4,324	17.33	
Samtse	Ngawang Nidup	2,045	8.20	
Samtse	Samten Lepcha	1,833	7.35	
Samtse	Badrinath Bhattarai	1,826	7.32	
Samtse	Shadeo Rai	1,758	7.05	
Samtse	Chhatrapati Phuyel	1,289	5.17	
Samtse	Narayan Dahal	800	3.21	
Sarpang	Anand Rai	4,278	24.41	Elected
Sarpang	Pema Tashi	3,736	21.32	
Sarpang	Tshering Norbu	3,590	20.49	
Sarpang	Dhan Bdr. Monger	2,455	14.01	Unseated
Sarpang	Ugyen Tshering Dorji	1,743	9.95	
Sarpang	Tshering Penjor	868	4.95	
Sarpang	Khari Lal Gurung	854	4.87	
Thimphu	Tshewang Rinzin	2,117	27.80	Elected
Thimphu	Tshokey Dorji	1,936	25.43	
Thimphu	Nima Gyeltshen	1,586	20.83	Unseated
Thimphu	Sangay Tshering	1,214	15.94	
Thimphu	Leki Tshering	761	9.99	
Trashigang	Lhatu	4,284	20.53	Elected
Trashigang	Jamyang	3,974	19.04	
Trashigang	Sonam Tobgay R	3,867	18.53	
Trashigang	Ugyen Dorji	3,557	17.05	
Trashigang	Chheki Wangchuk	2,494	11.95	
Trashigang	Pema Wangda	1,404	6.73	
Trashigang	Ugyen Phuntsho	1,288	6.17	
Trashiyangtse	Karma Gyeltshen	1,952	21.80	Elected
Trashiyangtse	Thinley	1,833	20.47	
Trashiyangtse	Phurpa Gyeltshen	1,799	20.09	
Trashiyangtse	Ngawang Tashi	1,524	17.02	
Trashiyangtse	Sonam Tenzin	1,221	13.64	
Trashiyangtse	Tashi Phuntsho	625	6.98	Unseated
Trongsa	Tashi Samdrup	2,309	40.81	Elected
Trongsa	Tharchen	2,005	35.44	Unseated
Trongsa	Gyem Dorji	1,344	23.75	
Tsirang	Dhan Kumar Sunwar	2,825	21.03	Elected
Tsirang	Nado Rinchen	1,401	10.43	
Tsirang	Nim Karma Sherpa	1,352	10.06	
Tsirang	Kencho Wangmo	1,117	8.31	
Tsirang	Ramesh Chhetri Bhandari	1,105	8.22	
Tsirang	Lok Nath Tiwari	1,100	8.19	
Tsirang	Tashi Norbu	945	7.03	
Tsirang	Tara Bir Ch0wan	855	6.36	
Tsirang	Sangay Tamang	770	5.73	
Tsirang	Hom Nath Thapa	712	5.30	
Tsirang	Migma Dorji Lama	674	5.02	
Tsirang	Sonam Tobgay	579	4.31	
Wangdue Phodrang	Tashi Dorji	4,995	41.12	Re-elected
Wangdue Phodrang	Passang Thrinlee	3,751	30.88	
Wangdue Phodrang	Dawa Tshering	1,618	13.32	
Wangdue Phodrang	Rada Wangchuk	1,357	11.17	
Wangdue Phodrang	Thinley	427	3.51	
Zhemgang	Pema Dakpa	2,639	29.98	Re-elected
Zhemgang	Dorji Cheten	2,182	24.79	
Zhemgang	Sonam Leki	1,894	21.52	
Zhemgang	Rinchen	1,217	13.83	
Zhemgang	Sangay Dorji	870	9.88	
Total		234,535	100	
Registered voters/turnout		432,030	54.29	
Source: Election Commission of Bhutan
