= 2023 Bhutanese National Council election =

- 20 April 2023

20 national councilors 11 seats needed for a majority
- Turnout: 54.64%
- Incumbent re-elected Incumbent defeated Open seat
Chairperson before election
Tashi Dorji
Independent
Elected Chairperson
Sangay Dorji
Independent

National Council elections were held in Bhutan on 20 April 2023.

== Electoral system ==
The 20 members of the National Council were elected from single-member constituencies using first-past-the-post voting.

== Results ==
Dzongkhag	Candidate	Votes	%	Notes
Bumthang	Kencho Tshering	4,381	40.1	Elected
Bumthang	Kunzang Dorji	2,261	20.7	Unseated
Chukha	Sangay Dorji	7,958	28.4	Re-elected
Chukha	Damcho Gyeltshen	4,141	14.78	
Chukha	Hem Prasad Rai	2,078	7.42	
Chukha	Tandin Wangchuk	999	3.57	
Dagana	Birendra Chimoria	7,143	25.88	Elected
Dagana	Surjaman Thapa	3,787	13.72	Unseated
Dagana	Tshechu	2,737	9.92	
Dagana	Dawa	1,746	6.33	
Gasa	Tshering	986	43.26	Elected
Gasa	Dorji Khandu	806	35.37	Unseated
Haa	Dago Tsheringla	2,690	31.84	Elected
Haa	Ugyen Namgay	2,101	24.87	Unseated
Lhuntse	Kelzang Lhundup	4,600	24.89	Elected
Lhuntse	Tshering Penjor	4,514	24.43	
Mongar	Tshering Wangchen	6,066	15.9	Elected
Mongar	Sonam Pelzom	4,349	11.4	Unseated
Mongar	Tashi Penjor	3,591	9.41	
Mongar	Dorji Wangmo	3,305	8.66	
Mongar	Chhimi Dorji	1,993	5.22	
Mongar	Tshering Dorji	1,255	3.29	
Mongar	Jigme Tenzin	926	2.43	
Paro	Ugyen Tshering	3,547	16.99	Re-elected
Paro	Jigme	3,330	15.95	
Paro	Gyeltshen Dukpa	2,135	10.23	
Paro	Ugyen Dorji	2,047	9.8	
Paro	Zecko	882	4.22	
Pemagatshel	Jamyang Namgyal	7,149	25.03	Elected
Pemagatshel	Choining Dorji	4,213	14.75	Unseated
Pemagatshel	Yeshey Jamtsho	3,999	14	
Punakha	Namgay Dorji	3,316	17.65	Elected
Punakha	Lhaki Dolma	2,843	15.13	Unseated
Punakha	Chencho Wangdi	1,968	10.48	
Punakha	Dophu Dukpa	1,627	8.66	
Punakha	Dorji Tenzin	1,164	6.2	
Samdrup Jongkhar	Tshewang Rinchen	5,639	19.64	Elected
Samdrup Jongkhar	Tshering Norbu	3,117	10.86	
Samdrup Jongkhar	Tempa Gyeltshen	2,999	10.45	
Samdrup Jongkhar	Karma Tshering Wangchuk	2,081	7.25	
Samdrup Jongkhar	Ran Bahadur Biswa	1,517	5.28	
Samdrup Jongkhar	Tshering Choeda	965	3.36	
Samtse	Tashi Dendup	7,161	13.82	Elected
Samtse	Kumar Ghalley	5,202	10.04	
Samtse	Subash Sharma	4,751	9.17	
Samtse	Ngawang Tshering	3,585	6.92	
Samtse	Chungdu Tshering	1,776	3.43	
Samtse	Pol Prasad Chapagai	1,595	3.08	
Samtse	Til Chand Sharma	1,138	2.2	
Samtse	Samir Giri	1,029	1.99	
Sarpang	Pema Tashi	5,253	15.54	Elected
Sarpang	San Bdr. Monger	2,918	8.63	
Sarpang	Kuenga	2,863	8.47	
Sarpang	Dechen Lhaden	2,170	6.42	
Sarpang	Deo Kumar Rimal	1,957	5.79	
Sarpang	Anand Rai	1,848	5.47	Unseated
Sarpang	Khari Lal Gurung	1,091	3.23	
Sarpang	Rajesh Rai	804	2.38	
Sarpang	Dorji Dukpa	760	2.25	
Thimphu	Leki Tshering	4,102	24.97	Elected
Thimphu	Nima Gyeltshen	3,046	18.54	
Trashigang	Sonam Tobgyel	12,958	24.83	Elected
Trashigang	Gongsar Karma Chhopel	5,584	10.7	
Trashigang	Jakar Dorji	4,923	9.44	
Trashigang	Sangay Tenzin	1,738	3.33	
Trashigang	Galey Tenzin	987	1.89	
Trashiyangtse	Sonam Tenzin	3,624	17.6	Elected
Trashiyangtse	Ngawang Tashi	2,708	13.15	
Trashiyangtse	Kiba Wangchuk	1,690	8.21	
Trashiyangtse	Karma Gyeltshen	1,350	6.56	Unseated
Trashiyangtse	Sonam Tshering	1,162	5.64	
Trongsa	Rinzin Namgyal	3,109	27.95	Elected
Trongsa	Sonam Penjor	2,897	26.05	
Tsirang	Nima Wangdi	5,359	20.52	Elected
Tsirang	Sarvajit Rai	3,382	12.95	
Tsirang	Yangkhu Tshering Sherpa	2,689	10.29	
Tsirang	Narapati Nepal	1,146	4.39	
Tsirang	Raghu Nath Nepal	921	3.53	
Tsirang	Gopal Thapa	886	3.39	
Wangdue Phodrang	Phub Dorji	4,143	18.52	Elected
Wangdue Phodrang	Nim Gyeltshen	3,498	15.64	
Wangdue Phodrang	Ugyen	3,176	14.2	
Wangdue Phodrang	Karma Dorji	2,204	9.85	
Wangdue Phodrang	Kuenley Tshering	1,709	7.64	
Zhemgang	Tshering Tshomo	3,170	15.45	Elected
Zhemgang	Sonam Leki	2,930	14.28	
Zhemgang	Thinley Jamtsho	2,781	13.55	
Zhemgang	Tshering Yeshi	1,367	6.66	
Zhemgang	Samphel Dendup	1,343	6.54	
Total		265,441	100	
Registered voters/turnout		485,811	54.64	
Source: Election Commission of Bhutan
