= 2013 Bhutanese National Council election =

National Council elections were held in Bhutan on 23 April 2013. All candidates ran as independents, as National Council members were prohibited from belonging to a political party.

== Electoral system ==
The 20 members of the National Council were elected in single-member constituencies equivalent to the country's twenty Dzongkhags. A further five members were appointed by the Druk Gyalpo.

Candidates had to register by 31 March, whilst the campaigning period lasted from 1 to 21 April. A total of 67 candidates registered to run in the election, although the Dagana and Trashigang dzongkhags had only one candidate each. In those dzongkhags voters were given the choice of voting against the only candidate.

Election day was a public holiday, and the country's borders were closed for the day.

== Results ==
Dzongkhag	Candidate	Votes	%	Notes
Bumthang	Nima	2,264	48.41	Elected
Bumthang	Sonam Tenzin	971	20.76	
Bumthang	Rinchen Phuntsho	951	20.33	
Bumthang	Tshewang Jurmi	491	10.50	
Chukha	Pema Tenzin	6,995	65.53	Elected
Chukha	Tshewang Lhamo	3,680	34.47	
Dagana	Sonam Dorji	7,989	81.83	Elected
Dagana	Against	1,774	18.17	
Gasa	Sangay Khandu	603	44.60	Elected
Gasa	Tenzin	407	30.10	
Gasa	Yeshey Dorji	342	25.30	
Haa	Tshering Dorji	1,866	51.68	Elected
Haa	Khandu Wangchuk	634	17.56	
Haa	Choda Jamtsho	631	17.47	
Haa	Tenzin Norbu	480	13.29	
Lhuntse	Tempa Dorji	3,193	60.08	Elected
Lhuntse	Rinzin Rinzin	2,122	39.92	
Mongar	Sonam Wangchuk	4,821	38.13	Elected
Mongar	Naichu	4,484	35.47	
Mongar	Tshering Wangchen	3,338	26.40	
Paro	Kaka Tshering	2,422	23.73	Elected
Paro	Kinley Dorji	2,075	20.33	
Paro	Ugyen Tshering	2,071	20.29	
Paro	Sonam Wangchuk	2,056	20.14	
Paro	Tshewang Norbu	1,583	15.51	
Pemagatshel	Jigmi Rinzin	5,184	57.78	Elected
Pemagatshel	Pema Wangchuk	2,103	23.44	
Pemagatshel	Sherab Jamtsho	1,685	18.78	
Punakha	Rinzin Dorji	3,449	55.51	Elected
Punakha	Namgay Dorji	2,764	44.49	
Samdrup Jongkhar	Jigme Wangchuk	5,213	55.28	Re-elected
Samdrup Jongkhar	Kinga Dorji	2,434	25.81	
Samdrup Jongkhar	Sangay Lhendup	1,784	18.92	
Samtse	Sangay Khandu	9,907	48.56	Elected
Samtse	Dhan Kumar Ghalley	4,595	22.52	
Samtse	Chungdu Tshering	1,944	9.53	
Samtse	Chhatrapati Phuyel	1,363	6.68	
Samtse	Ganesh Ghimiray	912	4.47	
Samtse	Kharananda Dhakal	906	4.44	
Samtse	Narayan Dahal	775	3.80	
Sarpang	Dhan Bdr. Monger	4,131	32.89	Elected
Sarpang	Sonam Doekar	3,855	30.69	
Sarpang	Rangu Pati Suberi	1,674	13.33	
Sarpang	Anand Rai	1,488	11.85	
Sarpang	Dhan Kumar Basnet	1,412	11.24	
Thimphu	Nima Gyeltshen	2,250	41.78	Elected
Thimphu	Tshering	1,624	30.16	
Thimphu	Tshering Tashi	1,511	28.06	
Trashigang	Sonam Kinga	11,229	81.20	Re-elected
Trashigang	Against	2,600	18.80	
Trashiyangtse	Tashi Phuntsho	3,226	58.51	Elected
Trashiyangtse	Karma Gyeltshen	2,288	41.49	
Trongsa	Tharchen	2,083	47.15	Elected
Trongsa	Tashi Samdrup	1,629	36.87	
Trongsa	Jagar Dorji	706	15.98	
Tsirang	Kamal Bahadur Gurung	2,381	24.40	Elected
Tsirang	Passang Thingh Tamang	2,011	20.61	
Tsirang	Shyam Basnet	1,920	19.68	
Tsirang	Novin Darlami	1,664	17.05	
Tsirang	Sangay Tamang	1,305	13.37	
Tsirang	Justin Gurung	477	4.89	
Wangdue Phodrang	Tashi Dorji	5,848	57.84	Elected
Wangdue Phodrang	Sonam Yangchen	3,540	35.01	
Wangdue Phodrang	Chado Namgyal	723	7.15	
Zhemgang	Pema Dakpa	2,413	35.92	Elected
Zhemgang	Yeshi Tshomo	1,219	18.15	
Zhemgang	Dorji Kadin	1,209	18.00	
Zhemgang	Ugyen Chophel	968	14.41	
Zhemgang	Pema Lhamo	909	13.53	
Total		171,544	100	
Registered voters/turnout		379,819	45.16	
Source: Election Commission of Bhutan

== Aftermath ==
Following the election Druk Gyalpo Jigme Khesar Namgyel Wangchuck appointed Dasho Karma Yezer Raydi, Kuenlay Tshering, Karma Damcho Nidup, Tashi Wangmo and Tashi Wangyal to the Council.
