= 2007–08 Bhutanese National Council election =

National Council elections were held in Bhutan for the first time on 31 December 2007, having been originally scheduled for 26 December. The new National Council had 25 members, which 20 members were directly elected from 20 dzongkhags by 312,817 eligible voters, and five more were appointed by the Druk Gyalpo. Nominations had to be filed by 27 November 2007, and the campaigning for 15 of the 20 dzongkhags took place from 30 November until 31 December 2007.

The elections were not held in five dzongkhags (Thimphu, Trashiyangtse, Gasa, Haa and Lhuntse) on 31 December 2007 since they either did not have any candidate or had only a single candidate till the last date for filing the nominations and the election rules state that there should be at least two candidates for each dzongkhag, otherwise the election would be postponed for that particular dzongkhag. The elections in these five dzongkhags were held on 29 January 2008.

== Election procedure ==
In contrast to the National Assembly's 47 party-based members, the National Council members were elected on a non-party basis and were meant to be eminent people from civil society. The two conditions laid down for the candidature for the National Council of Bhutan were non-affiliation to any political party and the minimum qualification of graduation from a university. The candidates for a particular dzongkhag were selected through the zomdus (meetings) convened in each gewog of that dzongkhag specifically for this purpose.

== Candidates ==
A total of 43 candidates contested in 15 dzongkhags in the elections were held on 31 December 2007. The highest number of candidates were in Samtse, Dagana, Mongar and Paro with four candidates each. Samdrup Jongkhar, Sarpang, Trongsa, Punakha and Trashigang had three candidates each. Chukha, Pemagatsel, Tsirang, Bumthang, Wangduephodrang and Zhemgang had two candidates each.

A total of 48 candidates filed their nominations for this election by 27 November 2007:

Dzongkhag	Gewog	Candidate
Bumthang	Chhoekhor	Jigme Palden
Bumthang	Ura	Tshewang Jurmin
Chukha	Bongo	Sonam Dorji Wangchuk
Chukha	Bjachho	Tshewang Lhamo
Chukha	Chapcha	Thinley Dorji
Dagana	Kana	Sonam Dorji
Dagana	Drujeygang	Kesang Dema
Dagana	Tshendeygang	Mongal Singh Gurung
Dagana	Lhamoyzingkha	Krishna Bahadur Tamang
Gasa		None
Haa	Bji	Tshering Dorji
Lhuntse	Khoma	Rinzin Rinzin
Mongar	Silambi	Choki Drakpa
Mongar	Saling	Naichu
Mongar	Chali	Pema Tenzin
Mongar	Chaskhar	Pema Wangdi
Paro	Dopshari	Ugyen Tshering
Paro	Lango	Ugyen Tshering
Paro	Wangchang	Phub Dorji
Paro	Lungnyi	Jambay
Pema Gatshel	Dechenling	Sangay Tempa
Pema Gatshel	Shumar	Jigme Rinzin
Punakha	Goen Shari	Namgay Penjore
Punakha	Kabjisa	Sangay Phurba
Punakha	Talo	Namgay Ratty Dorji
Samdrup Jongkhar	Orong	Kuenga Dorji
Samdrup Jongkhar	Deothang	Sangay Lhendup
Samdrup Jongkhar	Lauri	Jigme Wangchuk
Samtse	Dorokha	Chhatrapati Phuyel
Samtse	Chargaray	Mani Kumar Rai
Samtse	Bara	Lal Bahadur Gurung
Samtse	Tendu	Bishnu Lal Gurung
Sarpang	Gelephu	Karma Donnen Wangdi
Sarpang	Shompangkha	Jamyang Sherub Wangdi
Sarpang	Dekiling	Dhan Bahadur Mongar
Thimphu	Thim Throm	Sangay Zam
Trashigang	Shongphu	Sonam Kinga
Trashigang	Bidung	Tashi Tshering
Trashigang	Samkhar	Ngawang Jamtsho
Trashiyangtse	Yalang	Kezang Namgyal
Trongsa	Nubi	Namgay Wangchuk
Trongsa	Tangsibji	Jagar Dorji
Trongsa	Korphu	Chimi Dorji
Tsirang	Kikorthang	Pema Dukpa
Tsirang	Phuentenchhu	Justin Gurung
Wangduephodrang	Nyisho	Sonam Yangchen
Wangduephodrang	Phangyul	Kaka Dawa
Zhemgang	Trong	Pema Dhendup
Zhemgang	Nangkor	Pema Lhamo

The candidature of Thinley Dorji from Chapcha gewog of Chukha dzongkhag was cancelled by the Election Commission of Bhutan because of his affiliation to a political party on 7 December 2007.

After an additional nomination period, the candidates for the five dzongkhags which had postponed their elections were as follows:

Dzongkhag	Gewog	Candidate
Gasa	Goenkhatey	Sangay Khandu
Haa	Bji	Tshering Dorji
Lhuentse	Khoma	Rinzin Rinzin
Thimphu	N/A	Sangay Tsoki
Thimphu	Thim Throm	Sangay Zam
Trashiyangtse	N/A	Kelzang Wangdi
Trashiyangtse	Yalang	Kezang Namgyal
Trashiyangtse	N/A	Sherub Tenzin
Trashiyangtse	N/A	Ugyen Wangdi

== Results ==
Dzongkhag	Candidate	Votes	%
Bumthang	Tshewang Jurmey	1,965	54.34
Bumthang	Jigme Palden	1,651	45.66
Chukha	Tshewang Lhamo	6,140	56.03
Chukha	Sonam Dorji Wangchuk	4,818	43.97
Dagana	Sonam Dorji	4,112	40.79
Dagana	Mongal Singh Gurung	2,498	24.78
Dagana	Kezang Dema	1,777	17.63
Dagana	Krishna Bdr, Tamang	1,693	16.80
Gasa	Sangay Khandu	626	64.40
Gasa	Against	346	35.60
Haa	Tshering Dorji	2,242	88.51
Haa	Against	291	11.49
Lhuntse	inzin Rinzin	3,308	80.49
Lhuntse	Against	802	19.51
Mongar	Naichu	4,870	36.10
Mongar	Choki Drakpa	3,411	25.29
Mongar	Pema Tenzin	2,695	19.98
Mongar	Pema Wangdi	2,514	18.64
Paro	Ugyen Tshering	2,886	32.57
Paro	Jambay Dorji	2,088	23.56
Paro	Phub Dorji	2,004	22.62
Paro	Ugyen Tshering	1,883	21.25
Pemagatshel	Jigme Rinzin	6,100	69.70
Pemagatshel	Sangay Tenpa	2,652	30.30
Punakha	Namgay Penjore	3,509	50.69
Punakha	Sangay Phurba	1,734	25.05
Punakha	Namgay Dorji	1,679	24.26
Samdrup Jongkhar	Jigme Wangchuk	4,569	45.61
Samdrup Jongkhar	Kinga Dorji	4,205	41.98
Samdrup Jongkhar	Sangay Lhendup	1,243	12.41
Samtse	Dr,Mani Kumar Rai	7,996	41.52
Samtse	Bishnulal Gurung	5,612	29.14
Samtse	Chhtrapati Phuyel	3,325	17.26
Samtse	Lal Bdr, Gurung	2,326	12.08
Sarpang	Karma Donnen Wangdi	5,968	47.30
Sarpang	Dhan Bdr, Mongar	4,462	35.36
Sarpang	Jamyang Sherub Wangdi	2,187	17.33
Thimphu	Sangay Zam	2,923	61.61
Thimphu	Sangay Tshoki	1,821	38.39
Trashigang	Sonam Kinga	6,450	44.55
Trashigang	Tashi Tshering	6,198	42.81
Trashigang	Ngawang Gyamtsho	1,829	12.63
Trashiyangtse	Kesang Namgyel	1,936	33.30
Trashiyangtse	Sherub Tenzin	1,773	30.50
Trashiyangtse	Ugyen Wangdi	1,315	22.62
Trashiyangtse	Kelzang Wangdi	790	13.59
Trongsa	Dr, Jagar Dorji	1,823	47.87
Trongsa	Chimi Dorji	1,308	34.35
Trongsa	Namgyal Wangchuk	677	17.78
Tsirang	Justin Gurung	6,181	65.77
Tsirang	Pema Drukpa	3,217	34.23
Wangdue Phodrang	Sonam Yangchen	4,987	56.09
Wangdue Phodrang	Kaka Dawa	3,904	43.91
Zhemgang	Pema Lhamo	4,839	72.84
Zhemgang	Pema Dhendup	1,804	27.16
Total		165,962	100
Registered voters/turnout		312,817	53.05
Source: Election Commission of Bhutan
