= Sonam =

Sonam is a given name commonly used in North Indian, Tibetan, Nepalese and Bhutanese cultures. It is a Tibetan name meaning "merit" (Tibetan: བསོད་ནམས, Wylie: bsod nams, ZWPY: Soinam). Separately, it is also a name in various Indo-Aryan languages (Devanagari script: सोनम).

People with this name include:

== Buddhism ==
- Sönam Choklang, 2nd Panchen Lama (1438–1505)
- Sonam Gyatso, 3rd Dalai Lama (1543–1588), first officially recognized Dalai Lama
- Sonam Lhundrup (1456–1531), great abbot of Mustang
- Sonam Rapten (1595–1658), senior official of the Gelugpa School
- Sonam Rinchen (1933–2013), Buddhist Geshe from Kham

== Entertainers ==
- Sonam (actress) (born Bakhtavar Khan, 1972), Indian actress
- Sonam Bajwa (born 1989), Indian actress of Punjabi descent
- Sonam Bisht (fl. 2013–present), Indian actress from Uttarakhand
- Sonam Kapoor (born 1985), Indian film actress and fashion icon
- Sonam Kinga (fl. 1998–present), Bhutanese actor
- Sonam Lamba (born 1995), Indian actress from Chandigarh
- Sonam Lhamo (born 1988), Bhutanese actress
- Sonam Mukherjee (fl. 2010–present, Indian actress from Mumbai
- Sonam Tshering Lepcha (1928–2020), Indian folk musician from Sikkim
- Soname Yangchen (born 1973), Tibetan singer and songwriter
- Tenzing Sonam (born 1959), Tibetan film director

== Politics and government ==
- Sonom (died 1776), king of the rGyalrong people in China
- Sonam Drakpa (1359–1408), regent of Central Tibet
- Sonam Gyatso Lepcha (fl. 1999–present), Indian politician from Sikkim
- Sonam Lama (born c. 1975), Indian politician from Sikkim
- Sonam Pelzom (born c. 1986), Bhutanese politician
- Sonam Topgay Dorji (1896–1953), Bhutanese politician
- Sonam Topgyal (1940–2012), Kalön Tripa of the Central Tibetan Administration
- Sonam Tobgye (born 1949), Bhutanese judge
- Sonam Venchungpa (fl. 2019), Indian politician from Sikkim
- Sonam Wangchuk (born 1964), Indian Army veteran from Ladakh
- Jalley Sonam (fl. 2012–present), Indian politician and trade unionist from Arunachal Pradesh

== Sport ==
- Sonam Bhutia (born 1994), Indian footballer from Sikkim
- Sonam Chuki (born 1963), Bhutanese archer
- Sonam Gyatso (mountaineer) (1923–1968), Sikkimese mountaineer
- Sonam Tenzin (born 1986), Bhutanese footballer
- Sonam Tobgay (born 1990), Bhutanese cricketer and footballer
- Sonam Wangyal (born 1942), Indian mountaineer from Sikkim known for scaling Mount Everest
- Sonam Yoezer (born 1994), Bhutanese footballer

== Other ==
- Sonam Dechen Wangchuck (born 1981), princess of Bhutan
- Sonam Dolma Brauen, (born 1953), Tibetan-Swiss painter
- Sonam Lotus, Indian meteorologist from Ladakh
- Sonam Wangchuk (born 1966), Indian engineer from Ladakh
