= Nema =

Nema or NEMA may refer to:

== People ==
- Nema Andahadna (1939–2018), American priestess and occult writer
- Ui Nema, Japanese VTuber from Okinawa Prefecture

== Places ==
- Nema (island), Federated States of Micronesia
- Néma, a town in Mauritania
- Néma (department), a department in Mauritania
- Nema (urban-type settlement), an urban-type settlement in Kirov Oblast, Russia

=== Buildings ===
- NEMA Chicago, a residential tower in Chicago, US
- NEMA (San Francisco), an apartment complex in San Francisco, US

== Science and technology ==
- NEMA connector, several standardized connectors
- NEMA enclosure types, for enclosing electrical service apparatus
- NEMA (machine), a Swiss cryptographic rotor machine
- Networked Environment for Music Analysis, a project for music information processing

== Organisations ==
- National Early Music Association, UK
- National Electrical Manufacturers Association, US
- National Emergency Management Agency (Australia)
- National Emergency Management Agency (Mongolia)
- National Emergency Management Agency (New Zealand)
- National Emergency Management Agency (Nigeria)
- National Emergency Management Agency (South Korea)
- National Environment Management Authority of Kenya
- National Environment Management Authority of Uganda
- Northeastern Midget Association, an American sanctioning body of midget car racing
- Diocese of the Northeast and Mid-Atlantic, a Reformed Episcopal Church diocese in the United States and Canada

== Other uses ==
- Nema (community), Nimivanshi Rajput community in India
- Nema language, a Finisterre language of Papua New Guinea

== See also ==
- Neman (disambiguation)
- Nima (disambiguation)
