= Ganesh Ghimiray =

Bhutanese politician

Member of the National Assembly of Bhutan
- Incumbent
- Assumed office 31 October 2018
- Preceded by: Dina Nath Dhungyel
- Constituency: Phuentshogpelri-Samtse

Personal details
- Born: c. 1970
- Party: Druk Nyamrup Tshogpa (DNT)

Ganesh Ghimiray is a Bhutanese politician who has been a member of the National Assembly of Bhutan, since October 2018.

== Education ==
He holds a master's degree in International Hotel and Tourism Management.

== Political career ==
Before joining politics, Gimiray was an Entrepreneur.

He ran for the seat of the National Council of Bhutan from Samtse Dzongkhag in the 2013 Bhutanese National Council election, but was unsuccessful.

He was elected to the National Assembly of Bhutan as a candidate of DNT from Phuentshogpelri-Samtse constituency in 2018 Bhutanese National Assembly election. He received 5,332 votes and defeated Kamal Dhan Chamling, a candidate of DPT.
