= NIMA =

NIMA or Nima may refer to:

== Places ==
- Nima, Accra, a residential town in the Greater Accra Region of Ghana
- Nima, Shimane, a former town in Japan, merged into the city of Ōda
  - Nima District, Shimane, a former district that included the town
- Nima, a village in Mintiu Gherlii Commune, Cluj County, Romania
- Nima, a tributary of the river Someșul Mic in Cluj County, Romania
- Nima, Gansu, a village in Gansu, China.

== People ==
- Nima (given name)
- Nima (politician) (born 1978/1979), Bhutanese politician

== Other ==
- National Imagery and Mapping Agency, now the National Geospatial-Intelligence Agency, a U.S. government agency
- National Indigenous Music Awards held annually in the Northern Territory of Australia
- Nima (device), a portable food sensor for detecting protein allergens
- Nima (film), or Thread, a 2016 Greek film

== See also ==
- National Instructional Materials Accessibility Standard (NIMAS)
- Nema (disambiguation)
