= Nima (given name) =

- Pronunciation: Persian: [ˈniːmɒː]
- Gender: male, female

Origin
- Origin: Persian, Sanskrit, Tibetan
- Meaning: Just (fair), Famous, Well Known, Half Moon, Little King, Moon, Blessing, Sun
- Region of origin: Iran (Persia), India, Tibet

Nima (Persian: نیما) is a Persian male given name popular in Iran. It is also a popular female given name in India meaning "moon" and is derivative of the Sanskrit given name "Purnima", meaning "full" (pur) + "moon" (nima).

In Tibetan Nima (also spelled as "Nyima") is also a female or male given name which means 'the sun', also the one with radiance of the Sun. And in Hebrew as a female given name it means 'grace, mercy'. It also has a meaning in old Tabari or Mazandarani, which is "chosen archer" and also simply "archer".

== Etymology ==
=== Persian ===
There are different interpretations of what "Nima" stands for in Persian. It could mean 'famous, renowned', deriving from Middle Persian nāmik (nām 'name' + -ik 'adjective suffix'; 'a person of good name'). It could also mean 'half moon', a compound of nīm 'half' + māh 'moon'. Alternatively it could be a compound of nē 'no, not' + man 'I, me, human being' meaning 'no man'. According to Dehkhoda dictionary it could also mean 'just', 'someone who treats others fairly'.

== People ==
People named Nima include:

- Nima (politician) (born 1978/1979), Bhutanese politician
- Nima Arkani Hamed, Iranian-American-Canadian theoretical physicist
- Nima Fakhrara, Iranian film composer
- Nima Nakisa, Iranian footballer
- Nima Qavidel, Iranian footballer
- Nima Gholam Ali Pour (born 1981), Iranian-born Swedish journalist and politician
- Nima Momeni, arrestee in the 2023 death of businessman Bob Lee
- Nima Rumba, a singer from Nepal
- Nima Taleghani, English actor and playwright
- Nima Yooshij, contemporary Persian and Tabarian poet
- Nima Varasteh (born 1979/2014) Iranian composer and musician who founded the first digital music studio

== See also ==
- Nima (disambiguation)
- Nima (given name)
- Nia (given name)
- Nina (name)
- Niña (name)
- Nyima (disambiguation) which includes person(s) with that name
