= Tshering Tshomo =

Bhutanese politician (born c. 1983)

- ཚེ་རིང་མཚོ་མོ

Member of the National Council of Bhutan
- Incumbent
- Assumed office 10 May 2023
- Preceded by: Pema Dakpa
- Constituency: Zhemgang District

Personal details
- Born: c. 1983 Ngangla Gewog, Zhemgang District, Bhutan
- Party: Independent

Tshering Tshomo (Dzongkha: ཚེ་རིང་མཚོ་མོ་; born c. 1983) is a Bhutanese politician and former teacher. During the 2023 election, she was the only woman directly elected to serve in the National Council, representing Zhemgang District.

== Early life ==
Tshering Tshomo was born and raised in Sonamthang, a village within Ngangla Gewog in Zhemgang District. She graduated with a degree in education from Paro College of Education and became a prominent figure in the Khengrig Namsum, a cooperative of professionals working to improve the livelihoods of people living in the Zhemgang District.

Prior to her election, Tshering Tshomo worked as a teacher and a businesswoman, and lived in Thimphu with her two children.

== Political career ==
=== 2023 election ===
The National Council is the highest legislative and policy-making political body in Bhutan. It comprises 25 members, 20 of whom are elected directly from constituencies across the country, and five of whom are nominated by the King of Bhutan; all candidates must be politically independent with at least a university degree. The number of women in Bhutanese politics has been increasing in the twenty-first century, although the Buddhist-derived understanding of women being nangi-aum (lit. 'lady of the house') has led to a stigma that a woman's domain is inside the home, while the man's domain is outside of it. Women in Bhutan account for over half of the country's population.

Tshering Tshomo registered to become a candidate standing in Zhemgang District, stating that she believed it was a "woman's time" to represent the district. She was one of nine women to register; following the Dhamngoi Zomdu selection procedure, only five women were approved as candidates (including Tshering Tshomo), alongside 84 men.

Tshering Tshomo ran alongside four male candidates on a campaign of reversing high poverty rates in the district by promoting eco-tourism. During her campaign, some of the male candidate suggested that she would not be able to manage the responsibilities of serving as a National Council member due in part to her responsibilities as a nangi-aum.

Following voting on 20 April 2023, Tshering Tshomo was elected to serve on the fourth National Council, obtaining 3170 votes, comprising 15.45% of the total votes cast in Zhemgang District.

=== National Council (2023–present) ===
Tshering Tshomo expressed her regret that she was the only female candidate elected to the National Council, and called for a quota to be introduced to ensure adequate female participation on all levels of Bhutanese politics. She credited her win in part due to her being a woman, but also due to her campaign pledges being "practical" in nature.

Tshering Tshomo formally took up her role on the National Council on 10 May 2023. While she was the only female candidate directly elected, two other women – Kesang Chuki Dorjee and Tashi Chhozom – were nominated to serve as two of five eminent members of the National Council by Jigme Khesar Namgyel Wangchuck. Tshering Tshomo is the second woman elected to represent Zhemgang District in the National Council.
