= Gyem =

Gyem may be,

- Gyem language
- Gyem Dorji
- Gyem - an elfin spirit
