= Tashi Dorji =

Bhutanese politician

- བཀྲིས་རྡོ་རྗེ།
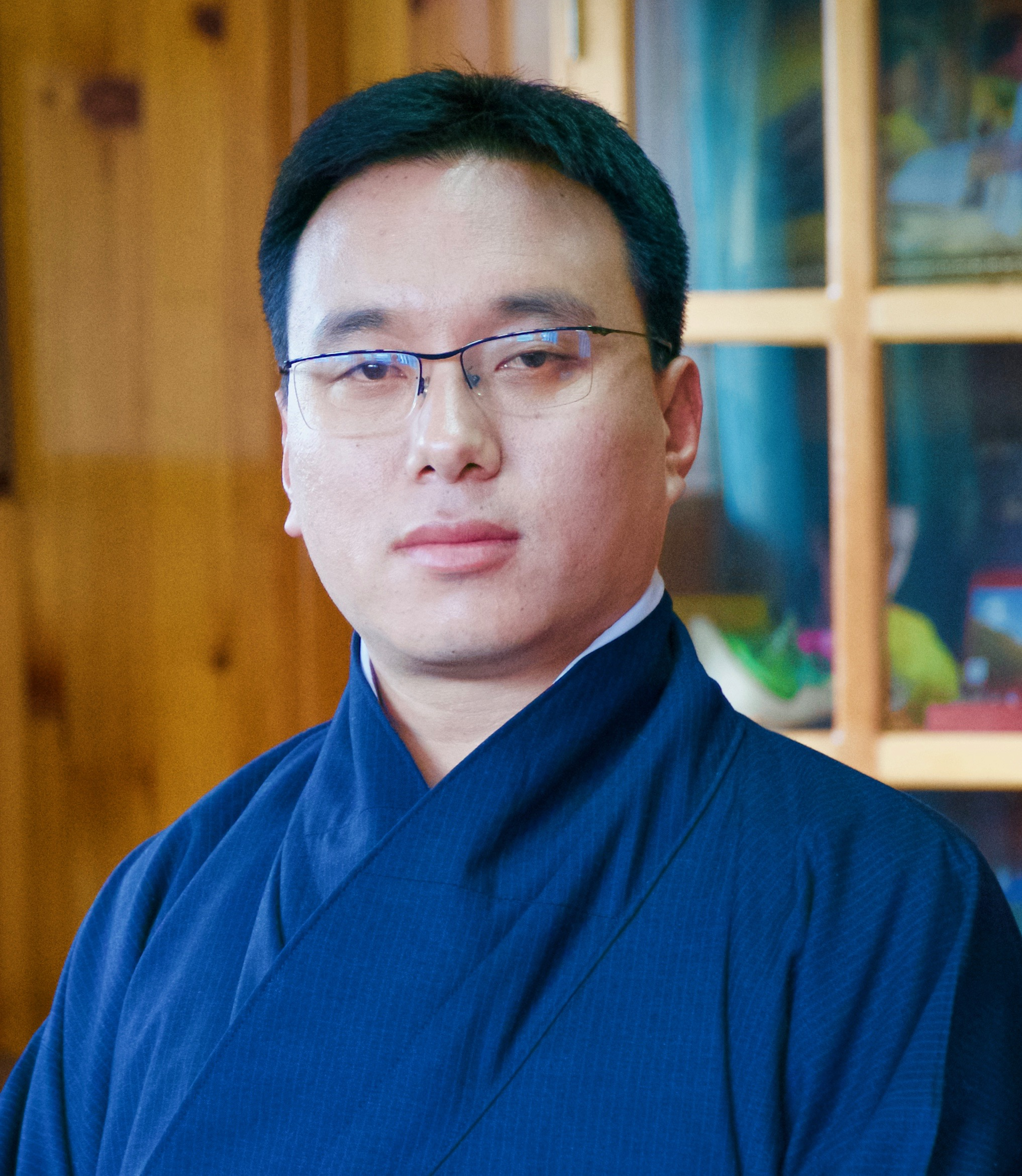
- Tashi Dorji in 2018

Chairman of the National Council of Bhutan
- In office 10 May 2018 – 10 May 2023
- Deputy: Jigme Wangchuk
- Preceded by: Sonam Kinga
- Succeeded by: Sangay Dorji

Member of the National Council of Bhutan
- In office 10 May 2018 – 10 May 2023
- Preceded by: himself
- Constituency: Wangdue Phodrang
- In office 2013–2018
- Preceded by: Sonam Yangchen
- Constituency: Wangdue Phodrang

Personal details
- Born: 3 October 1981 Agokha, Ruebisa, Wangdue Phodrang, Bhutan

Tashi Dorji (Dzongkha: བཀྲིས་རྡོ་རྗེ།; born 3 October 1981) is a Bhutanese politician who was the Chairman of the National Council of Bhutan from May 2018 to May 2023. He has been a member of the National Council of Bhutan since May 2018. Previously, he was a member of the National Council of Bhutan from 2013 to 2018. He is the youngest Chairman of the Upper house of Bhutan.

He was elected as Chairman of the National Council of Bhutan. He received 11 votes out of total 25 votes cast and defeated Lhatu and Nima.

== Controversy ==
While deliberating the Pay Structure Reform Bill 2022 on 29 November 2022, Tashi Dorji ordered Gasa MP Dorji Khandu to leave the hall for comparing the Housing Allowance for low-income civil servants and Communication Allowance for high-income civil servants. Gasa MP was subsequently suspended from attending the NC assembly until the adoption of the Pay Structure Reform Bill 2022 which attracted public criticism.
