= Gyem Dorji =

Bhutanese politician

Member of the National Assembly of Bhutan
- Incumbent
- Assumed office 31 October 2018
- Preceded by: Namgay Dorji
- Constituency: Draagteng-Langthil

Personal details
- Born: c. 1977
- Party: Druk Nyamrup Tshogpa (DNT)

Gyem Dorji is a Bhutanese politician who has been a member of the National Assembly of Bhutan, since October 2018.

== Education ==
He holds a Master of Science in Environmental Engineering degree from Asian Institute of Technology, Thailand.

== Political career ==
Before joining politics, he was an environmentalist and a forester.

He unsuccessfully ran for Trongsa District in the 2018 Bhutanese National Council election. He came in third receiving 1,344 votes and losing the seat to Tashi Samdrup.

He was elected to the National Assembly of Bhutan as a candidate of DNT from Draagteng-Langthil constituency in 2018 Bhutanese National Assembly election. He received 1,979 votes and defeated Ugyen Namgyel, a candidate of DPT.
