= Sangay (disambiguation) =

Sangay can refer to:

== Places ==
- Sangay, a volcano in Ecuador
- Sangay National Park, a protected area surrounding Sangay volcano

== People ==
- Sangay Choden, queen mother of Bhutan (born 1963)
- Sangay Dorji, Bhutanese politician (born 1981)
- Sangay Lepcha, Indian politician
- Sangay Ngedup, Bhutanese politician (born 1953)
- Sangay Tsheltrim, Bhutanese actor (born 1982)
- Sangay Wangchuk, Bhutanese athlete (born 1983)
