= Tashi Wangyal =

Bhutanese politician

Appointed member of the National Council of Bhutan
- Incumbent
- Assumed office 10 May 2018
- In office 2013–2018
- In office 2008–2013

Personal details
- Born: 2 June 1975 (age 50) Trabi, Ura, Bumthang, Bhutan

Tashi Wangyal is a Bhutanese politician who has been an appointed member of the National Council of Bhutan, since May 2018. Previously, he was an appointed member of the National Council of Bhutan from 2008 to 2013 and again from 2013 to 2018.
