= Samar Gewog =

Samar Gewog ས་དམར་
- Gewogs
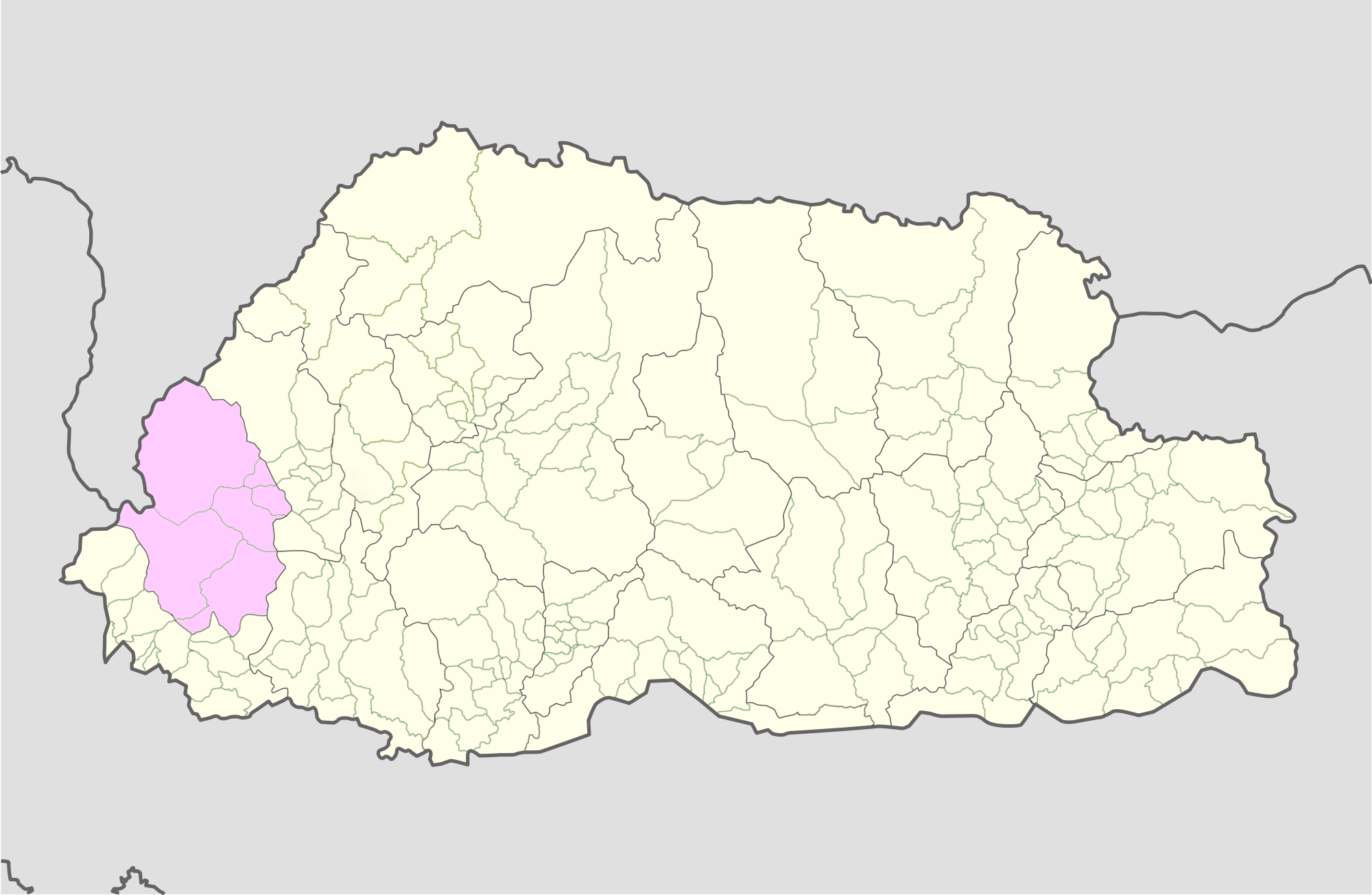
- Location within Haa District
- Coordinates: 27°17′56″N 89°15′13″E
- Country: Bhutan
- District: Haa District
- Time zone: UTC+6 (BTT)

Samar Gewog (Dzongkha: ས་དམར་) is a gewog (village block) of Haa District, Bhutan. In 2002, the gewog had an area of 361.7 square kilometres and contains 244 households.
