= Katsho Gewog =

Katsho Gewog སྐར་ཚོགས་
- Gewogs
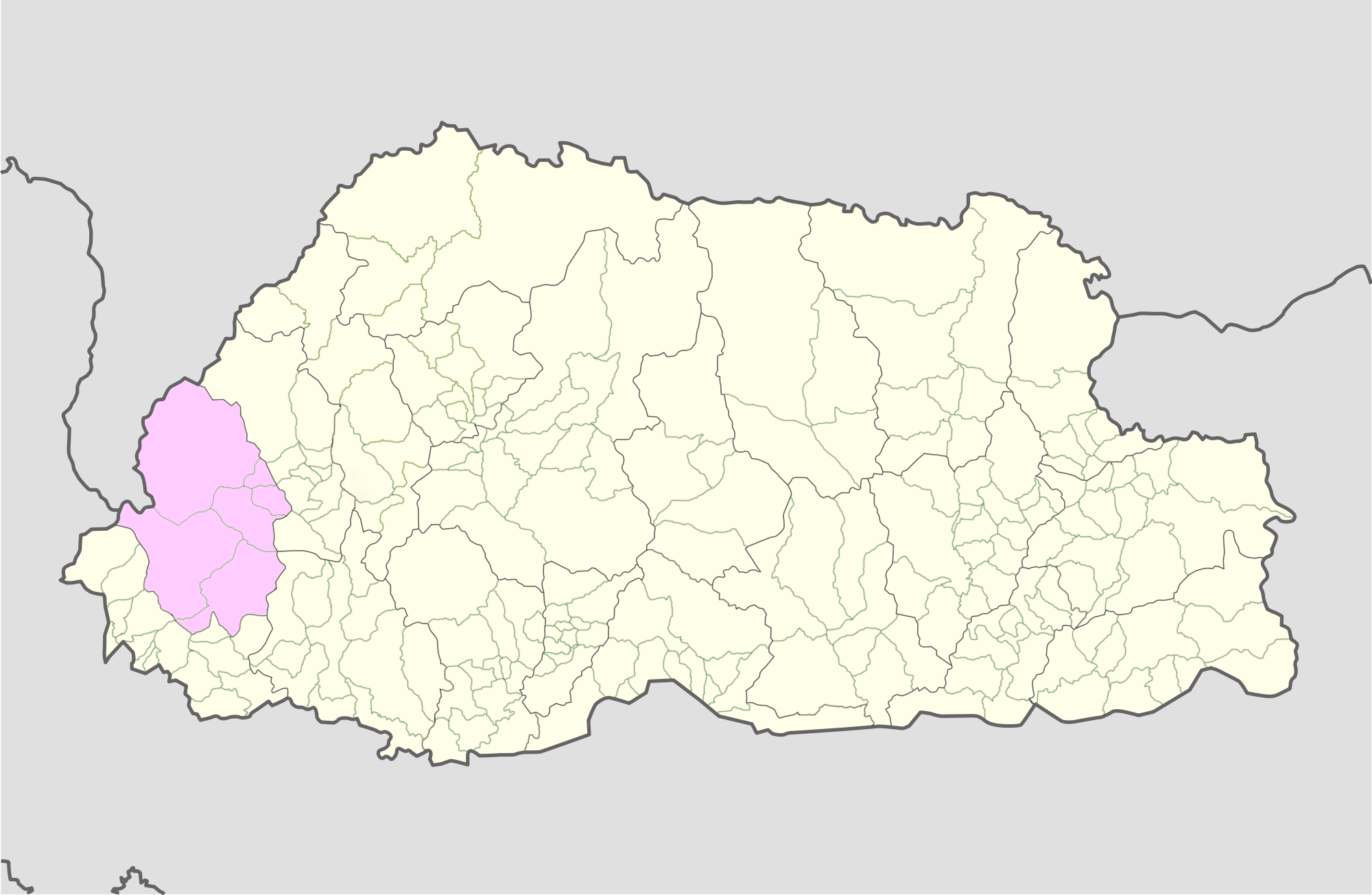
- Location within Haa District
- Coordinates: 27°24′03″N 89°17′28″E
- Country: Bhutan
- District: Haa District
- Time zone: UTC+6 (BTT)

Katsho Gewog (Dzongkha: སྐར་ཚོགས་, Kar-tshog Gewog) is a gewog (village block) of Haa District, Bhutan. Before substantial border changes, the gewog in 2007 had an area of 42.3 square kilometres and contained 10 villages and 247 households.
