= Tshewang Rinzin =

Bhutanese politician

Member of the National Council of Bhutan
- Incumbent
- Assumed office 10 May 2018
- Preceded by: Nima Gyeltshen
- Constituency: Thimphu

Personal details
- Born: 1964 or 1965 (age 61–62)

Tshewang Rinzin is a Bhutanese politician who has been a member of the National Council of Bhutan, since May 2018.
