= Uesu Gewog =

Uesu Gewog དབུས་སུ་
- Gewogs
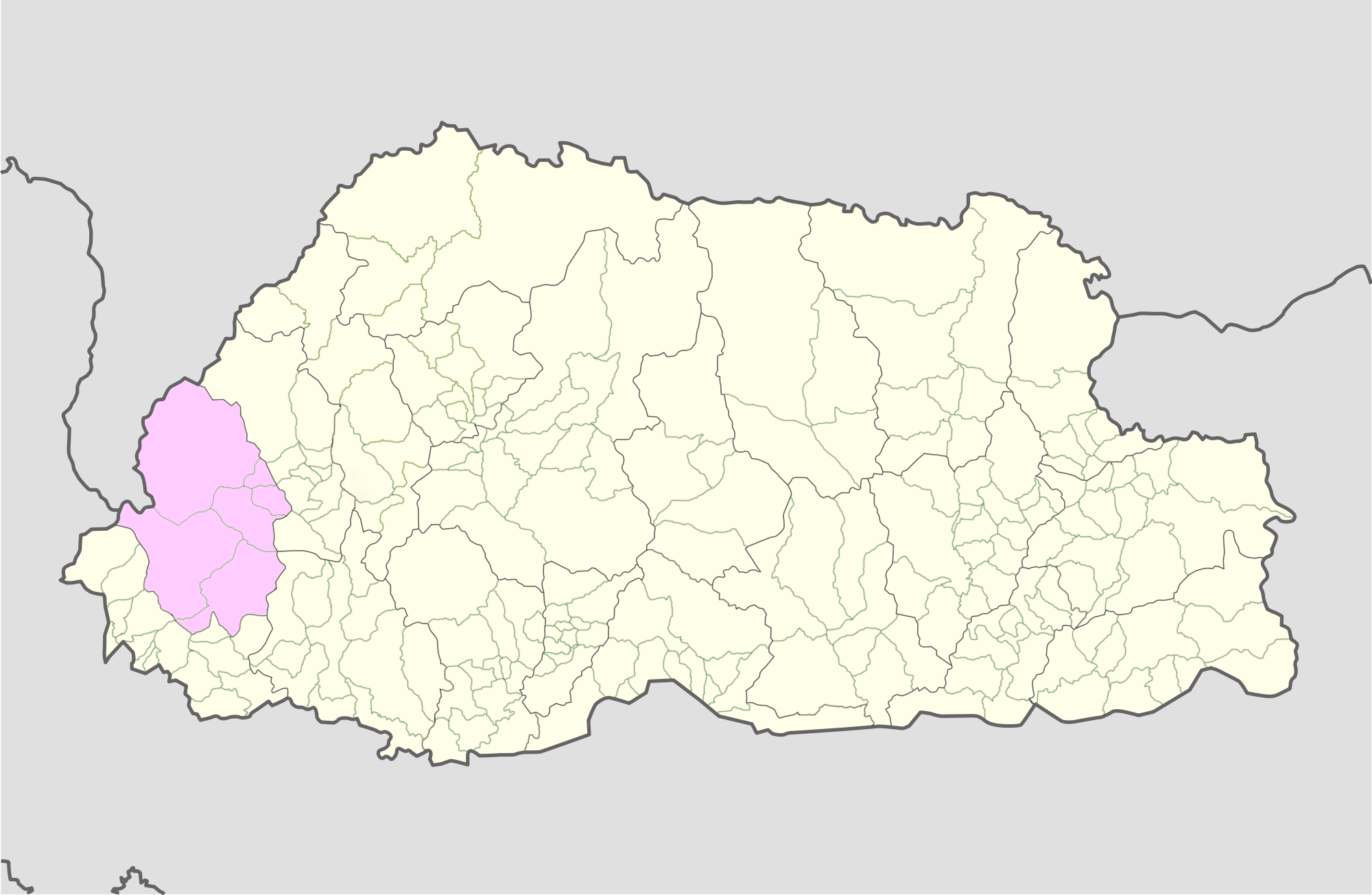
- Location within Haa District
- Coordinates: 27°20′27″N 89°18′52″E
- Country: Bhutan
- District: Haa District
- Time zone: UTC+6 (BTT)

Uesu Gewog (Dzongkha: དབུས་སུ་), or Üsu is a gewog (village block) of Haa District, Bhutan. The name means "Central Gewog". In 2002 it had an area of 67.7 square kilometres and contains 199 households.

== Temples ==
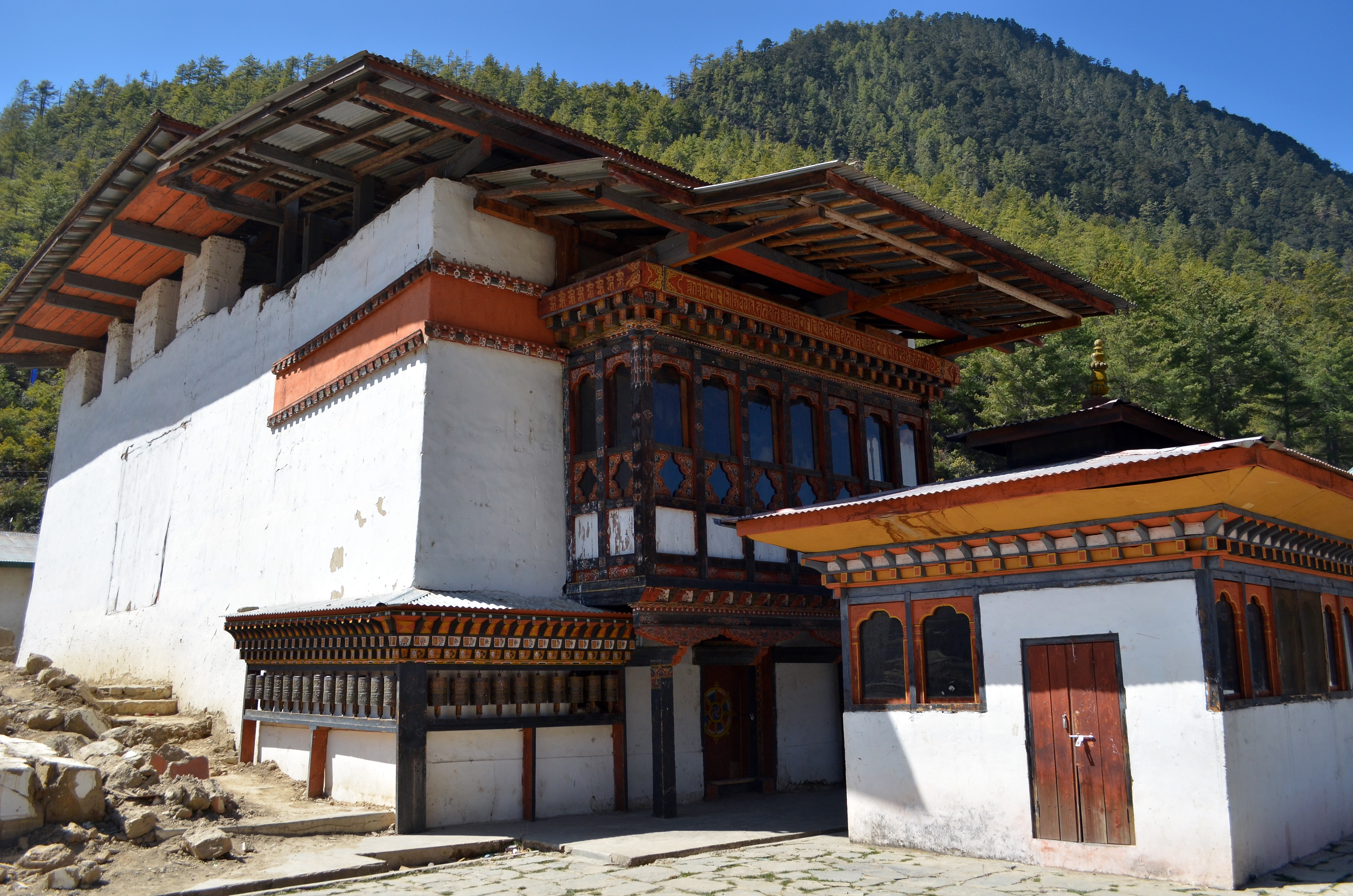
Lhakhang Karpo

There are several important Buddhist temples in Üsu Gewog:

=== Lhakhang Karpo ===
Lhakhang Karpo, or the White Temple, in Üsu Gewog, is believed to have originally been established in the 7th century during the time of the Tibetan Emperor Songtsen Gampo. It is located near the main road less than a kilometre south of Wangchuck Lhodzong. This temple usually houses the monastic assembly of Haa.

Currently (2011), Lhakhang Karpo is undergoing extensive restoration and re-construction. The monks quarters surrounding the main temple are being completely rebuilt.

=== Lhakhang Nagpo ===
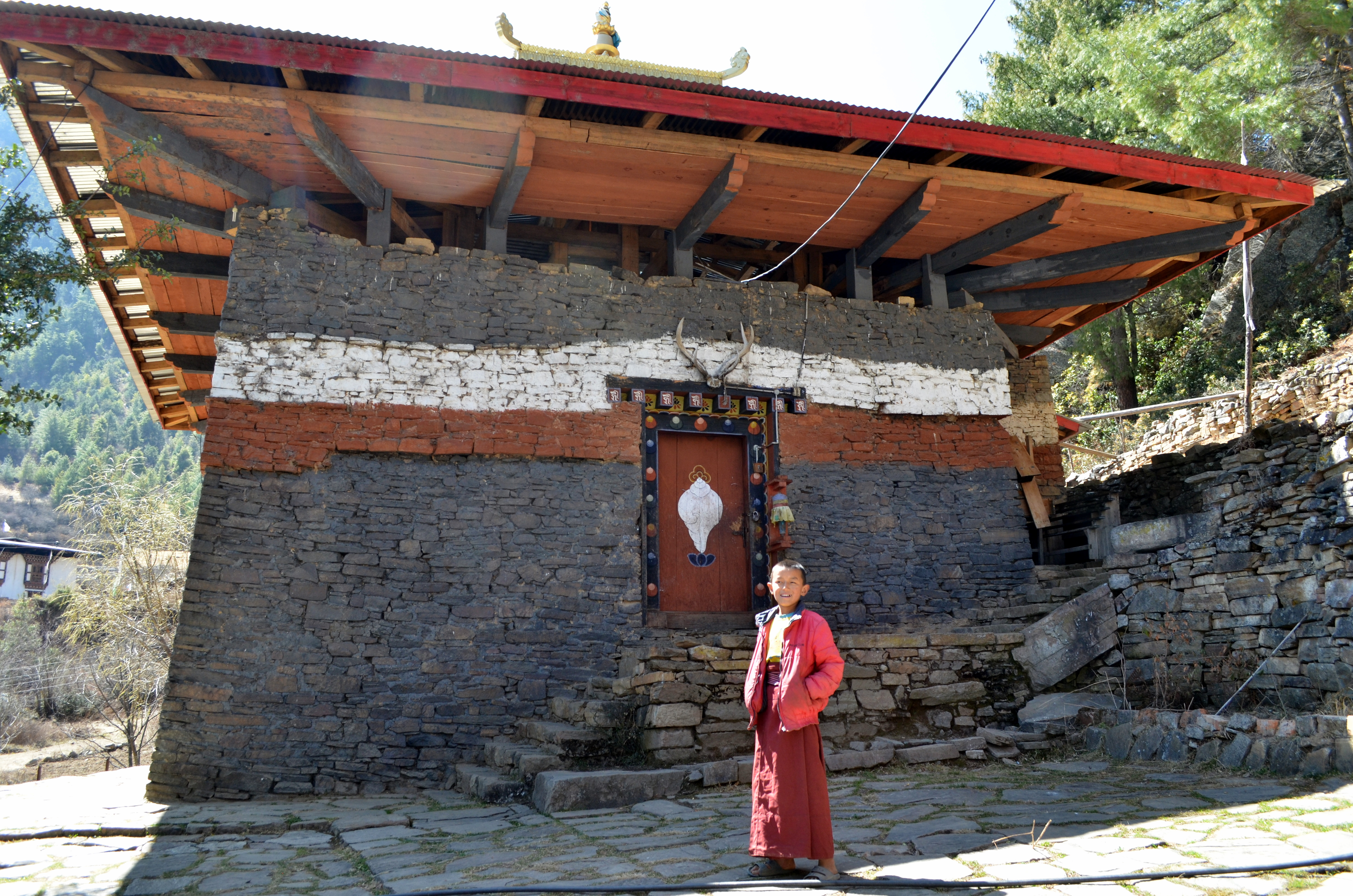
Lhakhang Nagpo

Lhakhang Nagpo, or the Black Temple, located a little above Lhakhang Karpo, was established at the same time as Lhakhang Karpo. Inside the temple is a small pool associated with the Buddhist protector Mahākāla.

According to one legend, rays of light emanated from the body of Chögyal Songtsen Gampo to this place and Lhakhang Karpo was built where the bright rays fell and Lhakhang Nagpo where the dark rays fell. Another legend has it that a white pigeon and a black pigeon, emanations of Songtsen Gampo, flew to this place from Tibet and landed where the two temples were built. A third account has it that these temples were built by three group of people who emerged from the nearby three brother hills of Haa, known as Miri Phünsum.

=== Shelkardra ===
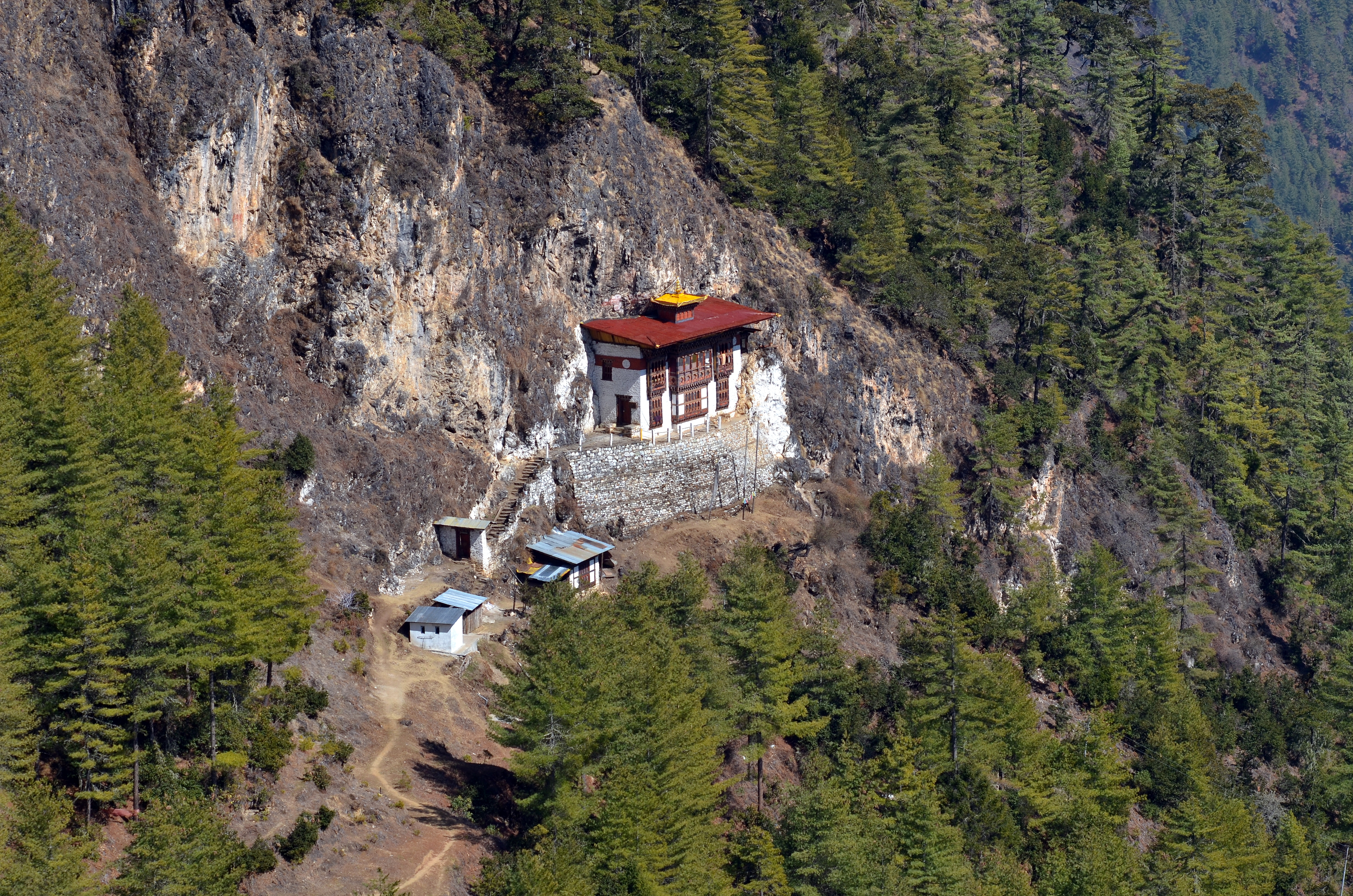
Shelkardra, Üsu Gewog

Shelkardra, or "white crystal crag", is considered to be a sacred place of Padmasambhava. It is located, near Lungtso village in Üsu Gewog, behind the sacred hill of Avalokiteshvara, the central hill of the Miri Phünsum. Jigme Tenzin, the sixth speech incarnation of Shabdrung Ngawang Namgyal, resided at the temple here while he was young.
