= Dhan Kumar Sunwar =

Bhutanese politician

Member of the National Council of Bhutan
- Incumbent
- Assumed office 10 May 2018
- Preceded by: Kamal Bahadur Gurung
- Constituency: Tsirang

Personal details
- Born: 1987 or 1988 (age 38–39)

Dhan Kumar Sunwar is a Bhutanese politician who has been a member of the National Council of Bhutan since May 2018.
