= Ministry of Information and Communication (Bhutan) =

Former government ministry of Bhutan

Agency overview
- Jurisdiction: Government of Bhutan
- Minister responsible: NA
- Website: www.moic.gov.bt

The Ministry of Information and Communication was a government ministry of Bhutan responsible for promoting the development of reliable and sustainable information, communications and transport networks and systems and facilitating the provision of affordable and easier access to associated services.

== Objectives ==
- To increase safe, reliable and affordable surface and air transport;
- To enhance access to sustainable, green and inclusive public transport;
- To improve access to reliable and affordable ICT and media services;
- To improve effective and efficient public service delivery; and
- To keep alive culture and tradition through ICT and media.

== Departments ==
The Ministry of Information and Communication is responsible for:

- Bhutan Infocomm and Media Authority
- Department of Civil Aviation
- Department of Information and Media
- Department of Information Technology
- Road Safety and Transport Authority
- Bhutan Broadcasting Service
- Bhutan Post
- Bhutan Telecom
- Druk Air
- Kuensel Corporation

== Minister ==
- Karma Donnen Wangdi (7 November 2018 - 2023 ...)
