= Karma Donnen Wangdi =

Bhutanese politician

Lyonpo Karma Donnen Wangdi
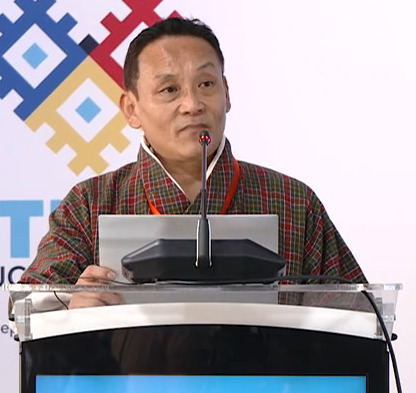
- Wangdi in 2022

Minister for Information and Communication
- In office 7 November 2018 – 28 April 2023
- Prime Minister: Lotay Tshering
- Preceded by: Dina Nath Dhungyel
- Succeeded by: Position abolished

Member of the National Assembly of Bhutan
- In office 31 October 2018 – November 2023
- Preceded by: Gopal Gurung
- Succeeded by: Harka Singh Tamang
- Constituency: Gelephu

Personal details
- Born: c. 1971
- Party: Druk Nyamrup Tshogpa
- Education: Sherubtse College; MCMIS

Karma Donnen Wangdi (c. 1971) is a Bhutanese politician who was Minister for Information and Communication from November 2018 until the abolition of the ministry in 2023. He was a member of the National Assembly of Bhutan from October 2018 to November 2023. Previously he was the member of the National Council of Bhutan from 2008 to 2013.

== Early life and education ==
Wangdi was born on c. 1971.

He received a Bachelor of Arts degree in Economics from Sherubtse College, Bhutan. He completed his Postgraduate Diploma in IT from the MCMIS, the Netherlands.

== Political career ==
Wangdi is a member of Druk Nyamrup Tshogpa (DNT).

He was elected to the National Council of Bhutan from Sarpang in the Bhutanese National Council election, 2008.

He was elected to the National Assembly of Bhutan in the 2018 elections for the Sarpang-Gelegphu constituency. He received 6,691 votes and defeated Pema Tashi, a candidate of DPT.

On 3 November, Lotay Tshering formally announced his cabinet structure and Wangdi was named as Minister for Information and Communication. On 7 November 2018, he was sworn in as Minister for Information and Communication in the cabinet of Prime Minister Lotay Tshering.

Political offices
Preceded by Dina Nath Dhungyel	Minister for Information and Communication; 2018–present	Incumbent
