= Gakiling Gewog (Haa) =

Gakiling Gewog དགའ་སྐྱིད་གླིང་
- Gewogs
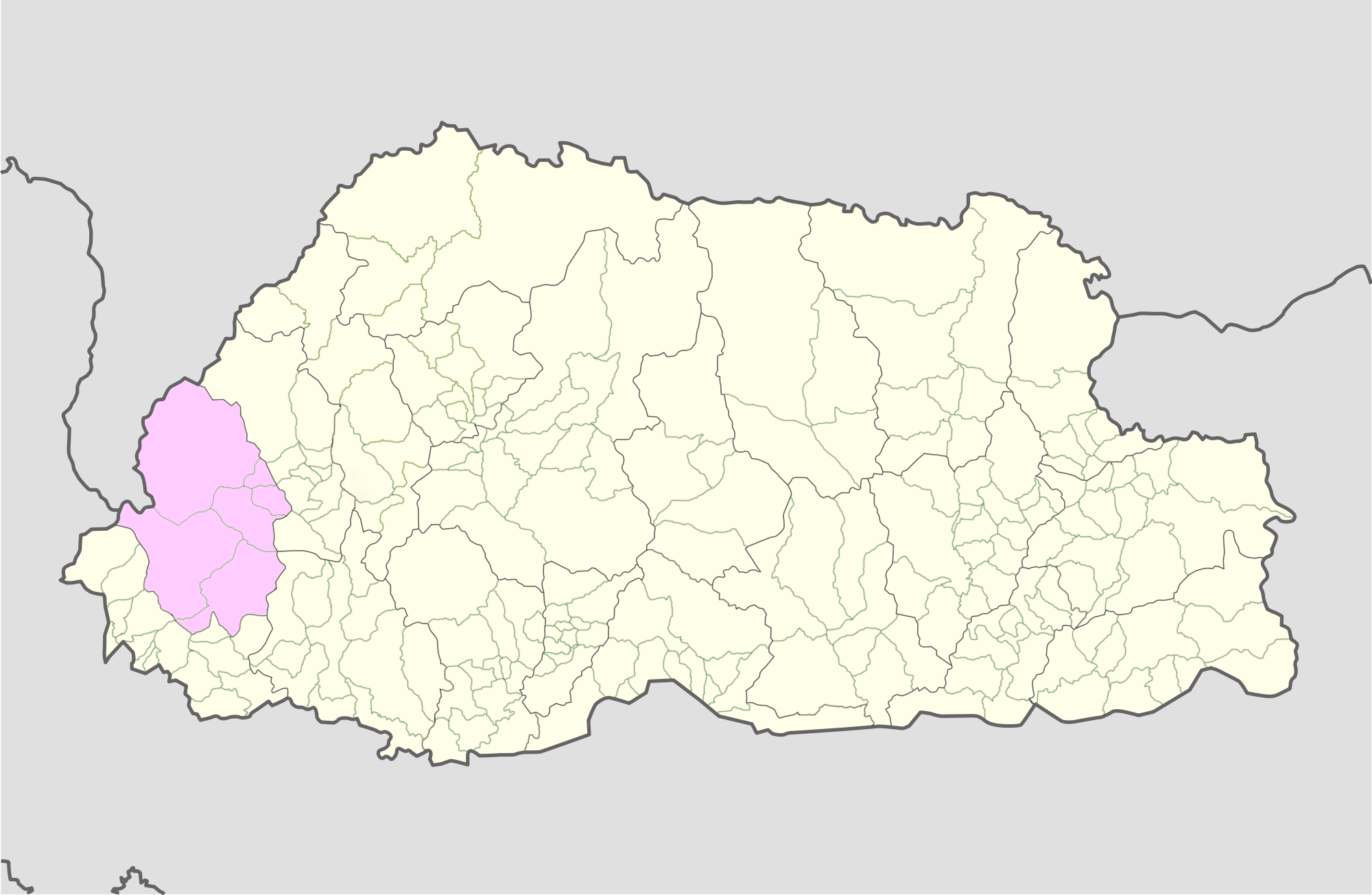
- Location within Haa District
- Coordinates: 27°08′30″N 89°14′11″E
- Country: Bhutan
- District: Haa District
- Time zone: UTC+6 (BTT)

Gakiling Gewog (Dzongkha: དགའ་སྐྱིད་གླིང་) is a gewog (village block) of Haa District, Bhutan.
