= Lhatu =

Bhutanese politician

Member of the National Council of Bhutan
- Incumbent
- Assumed office 10 May 2018
- Preceded by: Sonam Kinga
- Constituency: Trashigang

Personal details
- Born: 1967 or 1968 (age 58–59)

Lhatu is a Bhutanese politician who has been a member of the National Council of Bhutan, since May 2018.
