= Lhaki Dolma =

Bhutanese actress and politician

- ལྷ་སྐྱིད་སྒྲོལ་མ
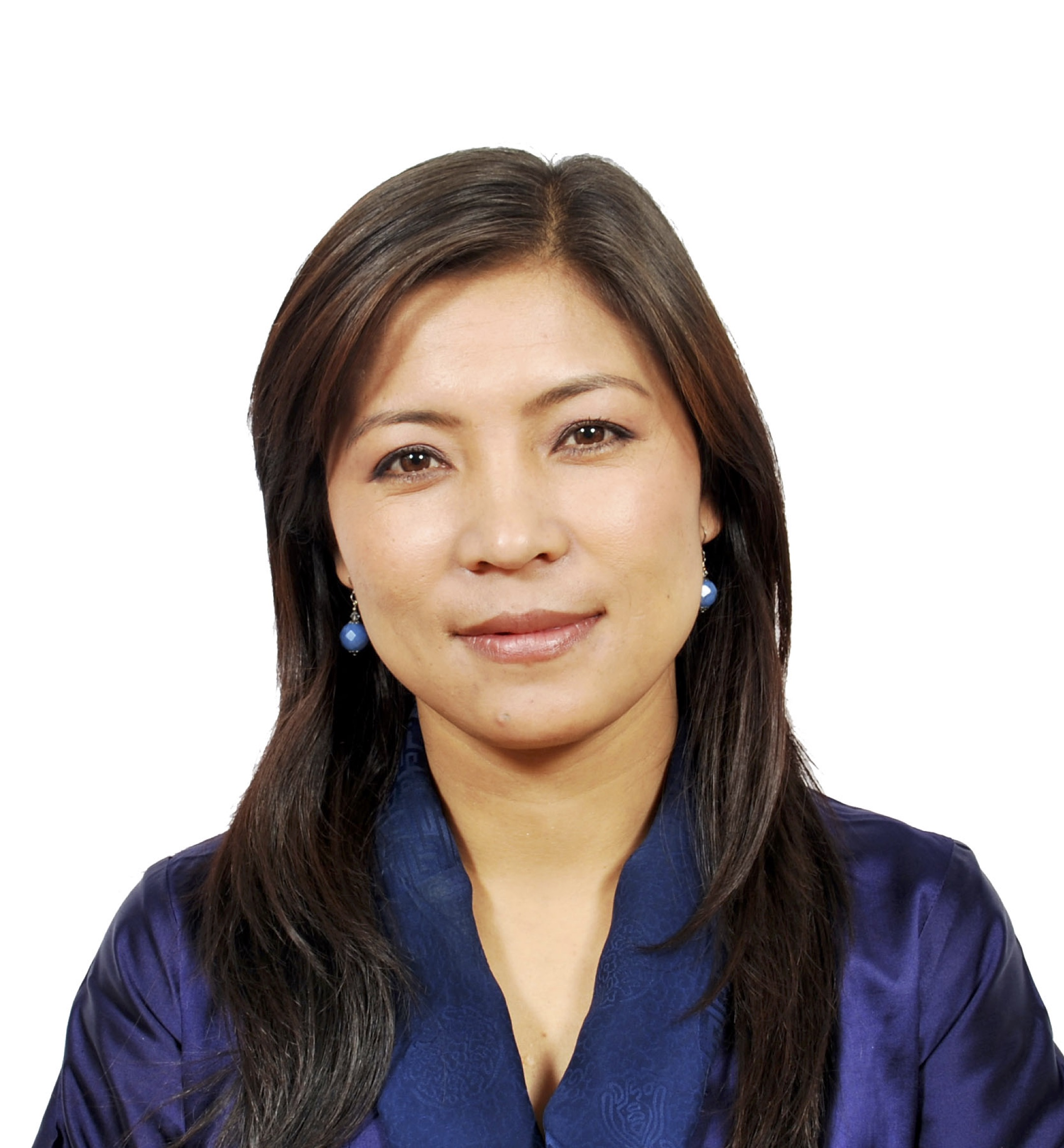

Member of the National Council of Bhutan
- Incumbent
- Assumed office 10 May 2018
- Preceded by: Rinzin Dorji
- Constituency: Punakha

Personal details
- Born: 1979 or 1980 (age 46–47) Punakha, Bhutan
- Spouse: Married
- Children: 3

Lhaki Dolma (Dzongkha: ལྷ་སྐྱིད་སྒྲོལ་མ) is a Bhutanese actress and politician who has been a member of the National Council of Bhutan, since May 2018.

== Education ==
Lhaki Dolma studied in the Semtokha Rigzhung School, a school for cultural and religious studies. She went on to pursue a Bachelor's degree in Language and Culture from the College of Language and Culture Studies, under the Royal University of Bhutan. She also has a postgraduate degree (PG) in Development Management from Royal Institute of Management (RIM) in Thimphu.

== Public service ==
Lhaki Dolma topped the prestigious civil service selection exams, and went on work with Ministry of Agriculture and Forests. However, she resigned from the government after three years to pursue a career in films where she resumed her acting life and also started scripting, producing and directing feature films.

== Personal life ==
Lhaki Dolma is deeply religious and a strict vegetarian. She is married and has two daughters and a son.

== Filmography ==
Year(s)	Title	Notes	Ref
2001	Chepai Bu	Debut film (Best Actress at the National Film Awards)	
2006	Euchung Lhamo		
2008	Seday	Best Actress at the National Film Awards	
2009	Bardo		
2009	Sha Dha Simo	Producer of the film (Best Film at the National Film Awards)	
2010	Yee Thro Lhamo		
2012	Lue Dang Sem	Producer of the film (Best Writer-Lyricist at the National Film Awards	
2012	Sa Dha Nam		
2014	Choegyal Drimed Kuenden		
2016	Lekzin		
2016	Hum Chewai Zamling 2023- Jigtenpi Tem || Last film ||		
