= Ugyen Tshering (National Council member) =

Bhutanese politician

Member of the National Council of Bhutan
- Incumbent
- Assumed office 10 May 2018
- Preceded by: Kaka Tshering
- Constituency: Paro

Personal details
- Born: 1969 or 1970 (age 56–57)

Ugyen Tshering is a Bhutanese politician who has been a member of the National Council of Bhutan, since May 2018.
