= Networked Environment for Music Analysis =

The Networked Environment for Music Analysis (NEMA) is a project for music information processing. The goal is to create an open and extensible web-service based resource framework for music information processing and retrieval. The work is performed at the International Music Information Retrieval Systems Evaluation Laboratory (IMIRSEL).
