= Nyima =

Nyima may refer to:

- Nyima County, a county in Tibet
- Nyima (Baingoin), a township in Tibet
- Nyima (village), a village in Tibet
- Nyima (Africa), a West-African community
- Nyima language, a language of Nigeria
- Nyima languages, a pair of languages of Sudan

== People with the name ==
- Gedhun Choekyi Nyima (born 1989), claimant to the title of the 11th Panchen Lama
- Lodrö Chökyi Nyima (born 1995), recognized as the 4th reincarnation of the Jamgon Kongtrul
- Chime Tenpai Nyima, a Tibetan Buddhist master
