= Sangay Dorji =

Bhutanese politician

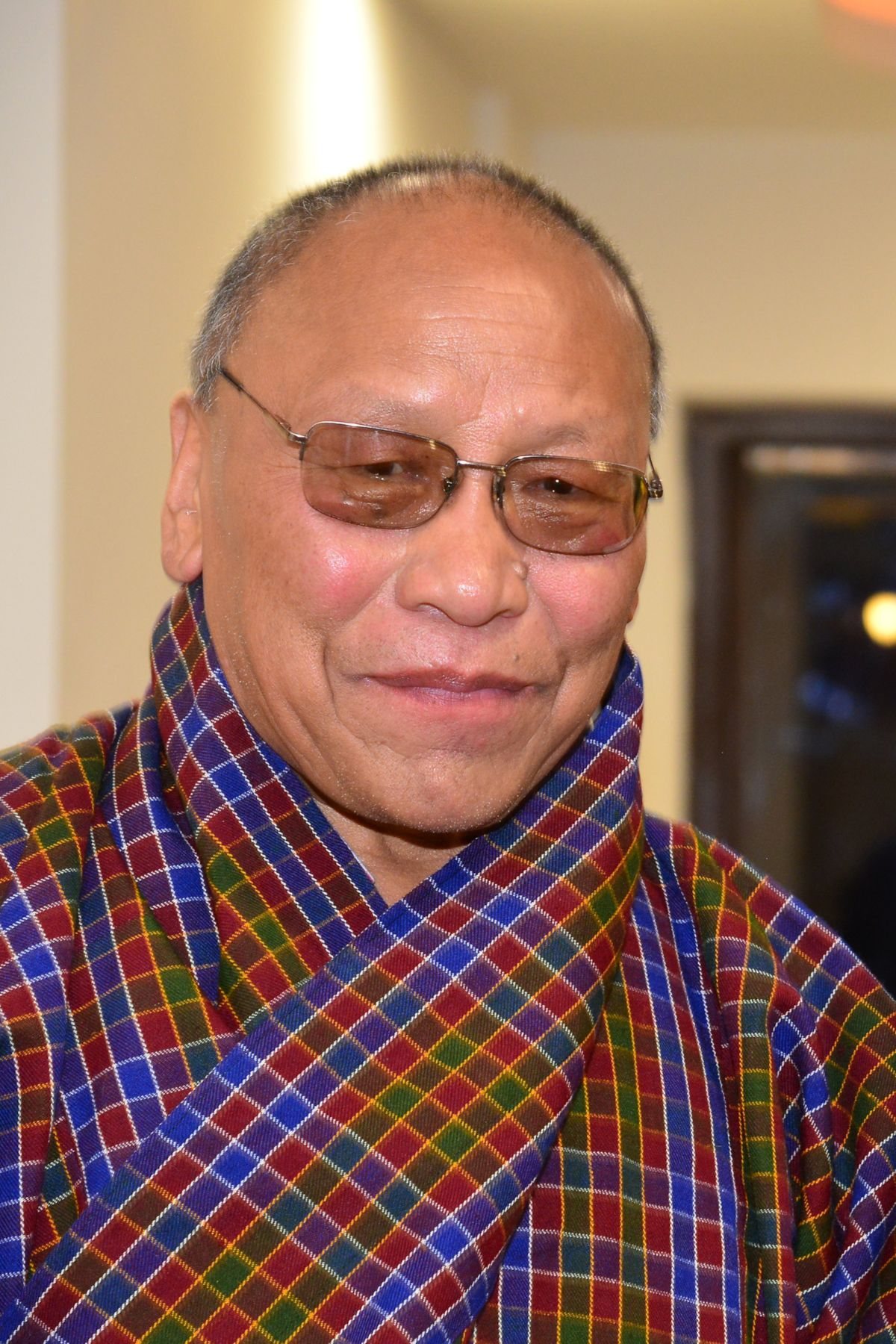

4th Chair of the National Council
- Incumbent
- Assumed office 10 May 2023
- Preceded by: Tashi Dorji

Member of the National Council
- Incumbent
- Assumed office 10 May 2018
- Preceded by: Pema Tenzin
- Constituency: Chukha

Personal details
- Born: 11 November 1981 (age 44)

Sangay Dorji (born 11 November 1981) is a Bhutanese politician who has been the 4th Chair of the National Council since 2023, and a member of the National Council since 2018. Prior to his political career he was an educator and principal.

== Early life and education ==
Sangay Dorji was born on 11 November 1981. He graduated from college with a bachelor's degree in education and a Master of Education degree in education management and administration. He received training in the Education in Emergencies programme by UNICEF in 2009. He worked as a principal in Chungkha and Mongar from 2004 to 2017.

== Career ==
In the 2018 election Dorji was elected to the National Council and was reelected in 2023. All of the members of the National Council are selected through nonpartisan elections.

Tashi Dorji's term as chair of the National Council ended in 2018. Dorji was elected as the 4th Chair of the National Council on 10 May 2018, through a secret ballot for a term set to end in 2025. As chair Dorji is the presiding officer of the National Council, signs legislation passed by the assembly, and is part of the nomination process for constitutional posts alongside the prime minister, chief justice, speaker of the National Assembly, and the opposition leader.

In 2023, Dorji and other members of the National Council attended a five day course hosted by UNICEF and Sherubtse College that was meant to educate them about social policy, how to analyze it, and how to best implement legislation.

== Personal life ==
Dorji lives in Gedu, Bhutan, and is a taekwondo instructor.

== Works cited ==
=== News ===
- "Incumbent Sangay Dorji takes Chukha". Kuensel. 20 April 2023. Archived from the original on 25 June 2025.
- "Know Your NC Candidate". Kuensel. 21 March 2018. Archived from the original on 21 March 2018.

=== Web ===
- "Bhutan". Inter-Parliamentary Union. Archived from the original on 25 June 2025.
- "Chairperson". National Council. Archived from the original on 25 June 2025.
- "Members Lists". National Council. Archived from the original on 25 June 2025.
- "Social Policy Course supports legislators to link legislative works with policies". UNICEF. 14 July 2023. Archived from the original on 25 June 2025.
- Dema, Karma (27 July 2023). "Parliament of Bhutan welcomes public hearings as means to improve lawmaking". International Institute for Democracy and Electoral Assistance. Archived from the original on 25 June 2025.
