= Karma Gyeltshen =

Bhutanese politician

Member of the National Council of Bhutan
- Incumbent
- Assumed office 10 May 2018
- Preceded by: Tashi Phuntsho
- Constituency: Trashiyangtse

Personal details
- Born: 1983 or 1984 (age 42–43)

Karma Gyeltshen is a Bhutanese politician who has been a member of the National Council of Bhutan, since May 2018.
