= Surjaman Thapa =

Bhutanese politician

Member of the National Council of Bhutan
- In office 10 May 2018 – 10 May 2023
- Preceded by: Sonam Dorji
- Succeeded by: Birendra Chimoria
- Constituency: Dagana

Personal details
- Born: 1984 or 1985 (age 41–42)

Surjaman Thapa is a Bhutanese politician who has been a member of the National Council of Bhutan, from May 2018 to May 2023.

== Education ==
He holds a Bachelor of Arts in Journalism and Mass Communication degree from St Joseph's College, Darjeeling.
