= Sonam Lotus =

Indian meteorologist

Sonam Lotus is the director of the meteorological department, Jammu & Kashmir. Lotus is owing to his precised weather predictions in the valley, he is also known as the "Saint Lotus", "Weatherman", or "Peer Lotus" for his accurate weather predictions. The Ministry of Earth Sciences (MoES), New Delhi honored Sonam Lotus with "Best Employee Award" for the year 2017 - 2018 in recognition of his significant contribution in the field of Meteorology which are averting disaster and natural calamities in the State.

== Life and career ==
He was born in Shara village, 60 km (37 mi) from Leh. Sonam took his examination for the Union Public Service Commission (UPSC) for which he qualified in 2005 and after that he underwent one year's training in meteorology and weather forecasting at the training school of the India Meteorological Department (IMD) at Pune. He earned a master's degree in physics from the University of Jammu.
