= Dorji Khandu =

Bhutanese politician

Member of the National Council of Bhutan
- In office 10 May 2018 – 10 May 2023
- Preceded by: Sangay Khandu
- Succeeded by: Tshering
- Constituency: Gasa

Personal details
- Born: 1986 (age 39–40) Laya, Gasa Dzongkhag

Dorji Khandu is a Bhutanese politician who has been a member of the National Council of Bhutan, from May 2018 to May 2023. Shortly after he travelled abroad to pursue a career in a different field.

== Education ==
He holds a Bachelor of Engineering in Civil Engineering and a Master of Engineering in Civil Engineering (WREM).
