= Choining Dorji =

Bhutanese politician

Member of the National Council of Bhutan
- Incumbent
- Assumed office 10 May 2018
- Preceded by: Jigmi Rinzin
- Constituency: Pemagatshel

Personal details
- Born: 1971 or 1972 (age 54–55)

Choining Dorji is a Bhutanese politician who has been a member of the National Council of Bhutan since May 2018.
