= Pema Dakpa =

Bhutanese politician

Member of the National Council of Bhutan
- In office 10 May 2018 – 10 May 2023
- Preceded by: himself
- Succeeded by: Tshering Tshomo
- Constituency: Zhemgang
- In office 2013–2018
- Preceded by: Pema Lhamo

Personal details
- Born: 1969 or 1970 (age 56–57)

Pema Dakpa is a Bhutanese politician who was a member of the National Council of Bhutan from May 2018 until May 2023. Previously, he was a member of the National Council of Bhutan from 2013 to 2018.
