= NEMA (San Francisco) =

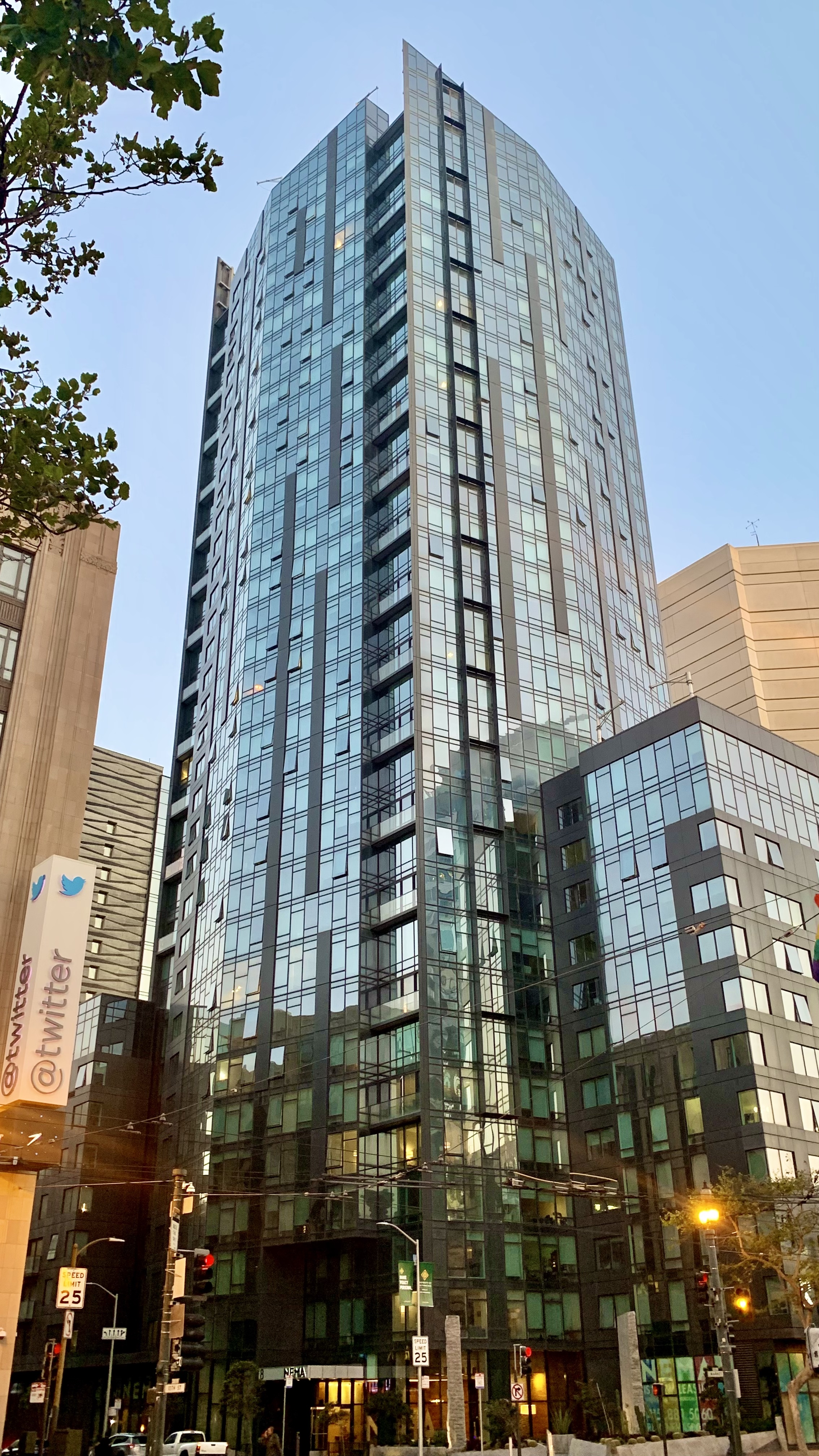
- In 2021

- Location within San Francisco Location within California Location within the United States
- Alternative names: Tenth and Market; 1401 Market Street; 1411 Market Street

General information
- Status: Completed
- Type: Residential apartments
- Location: 1401 Market Street; San Francisco, California
- Coordinates: 37.7759°N 122.4175°W
- Construction started: November 1, 2011
- Completed: March 2014
- Cost: US$200 million

Height
- Roof: North tower: 352 ft (107 m); South tower: 220 ft (67 m); Podium: 93 ft (28 m)

Technical details
- Floor count: North tower: 37; South tower: 24; Podium: 9

Design and construction
- Architect: Handel Architects
- Developer: Crescent Heights
- Structural engineer: Magnusson Klemencic Associates
- Main contractor: Swinerton

Other information
- Number of units: 754
- Parking: 550 car (valet); 754 bicycle

NEMA, also known as Tenth and Market, is a 754-unit luxury residential apartment complex in the Mid-Market neighborhood of San Francisco, California, United States, across the street from Twitter's corporate headquarters. The complex consists of a 24-story, tower at Jessie and Tenth Streets and a 37-story, tower at Market and Tenth Streets, connected by a nine-story podium along Tenth Street.

== History ==
The developers of NEMA bought the property in 2006, which then was the site of a vacant office building. Originally designed by Heller Manus as 719 residential condominiums, the project site was cleared for development in 2007. Due to the 2008 financial crisis, developer Crescent Heights converted the project to apartments, but the site remained a vacant hole in the ground for four years. In July 2009, the developers received approval to increase the dwelling unit count by 35 to 754. Construction on the project began on November 1, 2011.

In 2013, "NEMA", short for New Market opened in Mid-Market. The first residents moved into the south tower on October 1, 2013, while the north tower opened to residents in March 2014. In 2015, NEMA sponsored a landscape art installation by Topher Delaney. In 2016, NEMA sponsored an interactive art project entitled "Wall of Good Looks" along Market Street.

== Design and construction ==
Designed by Handel Architects, NEMA's four linked apartment building towers range from 10 to 37 stories high. NEMA was designed to achieve Leadership in Energy and Environmental Design (LEED) Silver Certification from the U.S. Green Building Council.

== Awards ==
In 2014, NEMA won Best New Development of the Year by the San Francisco Apartment Association, the IBcon Digie Award for Most Intelligent Building, Market Rate Rental Project of the Year by the San Francisco Business Times. In 2015, NEMA won the Alliant Build America award and the Best Amenities of the Year award by the San Francisco Apartment Association.

== See also ==
- List of tallest buildings in San Francisco
