= Nima (device) =

Consumer food alergy tester

- Developer: Nima (fka 6SensorLabs)
- Display: OLED
- Connectivity: Bluetooth low energy
- Power: 320-mAh LiPo battery
- Dimensions: Length: 3.5 in; width: 1.0 in; height: 3.1 in
- Website: nimanow.com

Nima is a portable food sensor designed to enable individuals with food allergies and sensitivities to test their food for specific proteins. Nima created and leads the category of consumer food testers. The first product, a gluten sensor, was released for general availability in February 2017. The second product, a peanut sensor, was released for general availability in September 2018. Nima caters to people who have food sensitivities and food allergies, and require additional data before making a decision at mealtime. The founders of Nima met at the Massachusetts Institute of Technology (MIT) and have severe food sensitivities and family members with extreme food allergies. They were personally motivated to find a solution to help improve the chances of staying healthy and social when eating outside of the home for themselves, their families and the millions of people who are actively avoiding certain foods to stay healthy. Nima was born out of MIT in 2013.[1] Nima was acquired by Medline Industries in 2020.[2] Whether by decision or COVID-19 impact, testing capsules for the testing units were immediately unavailable for purchase on Amazon after the acquisition announcement; however, became available a few months after the acquisition. Medline spun out Nima and re-branded the company to Nima Partners. The gluten products are still available for purchase on the Nima Partners website.[3]

== Operation ==
A food sample is placed in a one-time-use capsule, which is inserted into the Nima sensor. Once the test begins, the food is mixed with proprietary antibodies and analyzed by the sensor in under 5 minutes. Nima delivers a binary result for the sample tested for gluten and peanut. The gluten sensor is tuned to 20 parts per million (ppm) for gluten and 10 ppm for peanut. If the sample contains 20 ppm or more of gluten, Nima is designed to deliver a gluten found indication, to indicate gluten was found. If the sample contains 10 ppm or more of peanut, Nima is designed to deliver a peanut found for the sample. If there is no detectable gluten or peanut, Nima will display a smiley face to indicate that there was no detectable target protein in the sampled food. The device has not been approved by the FDA, and the developers contest that such approval is not necessary because they "are not using it to diagnose or manage disease."[4] Nima has also developed a companion application for iOS and Android, connected through Bluetooth, that allows users to connect with other Nima owners and find allergen information for specific restaurants and packaged foods.[5] The company plans to eventually expand its technology to detect other allergens, such as dairy and tree nuts. They are also exploring detection methods for additives, GMOs, preservatives and possible causes of food poisoning.[6]

== Science, accuracy and validation ==
Nima uses antibody based chemistry to detect proteins in food at the parts per million level for both gluten and peanut. The Nima science has been third-party validated and published in peer-reviewed journals. Nima reports accuracy as the ability to detect gluten in samples of food at 10ppm and above. Nima reports above 98.7% accuracy when comparing the performance of gluten and peanut detection to the leading food diagnostic lab ELISA tests for traces of gluten at the range of 20ppm and above in food samples and peanut at the range of 10ppm and above.[7] Dr. Stephen Taylor, founder and director of the Food Allergy Research and Resource program,[8] concludes on behalf of the validation study for Nima gluten, "We conclude that the portable, handheld Nima gluten sensor functions reliably detect gluten residues at appropriate levels in a range of different foods. The foods were deliberately chosen to represent the wide range of products that might be available as gluten-free options. In our opinion, use of the Nima device will protect the health of gluten-sensitive consumers, if properly used on foods with reasonably uniform gluten distribution."[9] Nima also has published third-party validation for the Nima peanut sensor.[10] In addition to the third-party validation, Nima's validation studies have been published in peer-reviewed journals, including Food Chemistry[11] and The Journal of Food Protection.[9] Studies of Nima's food testing data have also been published in the American Journal of Gastroenterology.[12] A clinical study by researchers and clinicians at the Columbia University Celiac Disease Center found that Nima improved the quality of life of adult celiacs.[13]

== Limitations ==
Nima Partners, Inc, the company behind Nima, communicates that Nima is a supplement and extra data point to what users are already doing to try to avoid gluten when eating out. As quoted on the Nima packaging, "Nima test results are only representative of the sample and are not a guarantee of the entire dish. Use of this product should not replace education, medical advice, compliance with food labeling and adherence to avoidance strategies. Failure to use this product in accordance with the instruction could result in serious injury or death. Neither the Nima device or individual capsules are designed to be ingested or eaten." While Nima works on most food types, Nima's sensing technology has a few limitations, including detection of proteins in hydrolyzed and fermented foods for gluten. This is most challenging for gluten detection in the case of soy sauce and alcohol - Nima cannot detect gluten in soy sauce or alcohol. The peanut sensor also has limitations for some high concentrations of ingredients. The full list of limitations are published and linked on the Nima FAQs website.[14]

== Gluten in unexpected places ==
The majority of Nima users use Nima when eating out at restaurants and testing samples of food that may be higher risk for cross-contamination, such as shared fryers, gluten-free pizzas cooked in pizza ovens with non-gluten items, sauces, and marinades. When testing at home, Nima users typically test packaged foods with unclear ingredients or no gluten or peanut ingredients, which are not labelled gluten-free or peanut-free. Nima users can share their test results on the Nima app and see what other people are testing. A study by the Columbia Celiac Disease Center analyzed thousands of Nima user test results and found that gluten was present in one out of three gluten-free labelled dishes in restaurants.

== Reception ==
Generally, Nima has been positively received in the marketplace, with recognition by top publications, including Time magazine's Best Inventions and Popular Science's 12 Most Important Health Innovations of the Year. An investigative reporter as part of the Rossen Reports put the Nima peanut sensor to the test on the Today Show, with positive results.
