= Tashi Samdrup =

Bhutanese politician

Member of the National Council of Bhutan
- Incumbent
- Assumed office 10 May 2018
- Preceded by: Tharchen
- Constituency: Trongsa

Personal details
- Born: 1972 or 1973 (age 53–54)

Tashi Samdrup is a Bhutanese politician who has been a member of the National Council of Bhutan, since May 2018.
