= Jigme Wangchuk (National Council member) =

Bhutanese politician

- འཇིགས་མེད་དབང་ཕྱུག།

Deputy Chairman of the National Council of Bhutan
- Incumbent
- Assumed office 10 May 2018
- Preceded by: Tshering Dorji

Member of the National Council of Bhutan
- Incumbent
- Assumed office 10 May 2018
- Constituency: Samdrup Jongkhar
- In office 2013–2018
- Constituency: Samdrup Jongkhar
- In office 2008–2013
- Constituency: Samdrup Jongkhar

Personal details
- Born: 4 March 1980 Momring, Lauri, Samdrup Jongkhar

Jigme Wangchuk (Dzongkha: འཇིགས་མེད་དབང་ཕྱུག།; born 4 March 1980) is a Bhutanese politician who is the current Deputy Chairman of the National Council of Bhutan. He has been a member of the National Council of Bhutan, since May 2018. Previously, he was a member of the National Council of Bhutan from 2008 to 2013 and again from 2013 to 2018.

He was elected as Deputy Chairman of the National Council of Bhutan. He received 13 votes out of total 25 votes cast and defeated Ugyen Namgay.
