= Ugyen Namgay =

Bhutanese politician

Member of the National Council of Bhutan
- In office 10 May 2018 – 10 May 2023
- Preceded by: Tshering Dorji
- Succeeded by: Dago Tsheringla
- Constituency: Haa

Personal details
- Born: 1983 or 1984 (age 42–43)

Ugyen Namgay is a Bhutanese politician who has been a member of the National Council of Bhutan, from May 2018 to May 2023.
