= Sonam Pelzom =

Bhutanese politician

- བསོད་ནམས་དཔལ་འཛོམས

Member of the National Council of Bhutan
- Incumbent
- Assumed office 10 May 2018
- Preceded by: Sonam Wangchuk
- Constituency: Mongar

Personal details
- Born: 1986 or 1987 (age 39–40)

Sonam Pelzom (Dzongkha: བསོད་ནམས་དཔལ་འཛོམས) is a Bhutanese politician who has been a member of the National Council of Bhutan, since May 2018.
