= Sonam Kinga =

Bhutanese politician (born 1973)

Dasho Sonam Kinga (born 6 June 1973) is a World Fellow at the Yale University. He is also a member of the Teaching Faculty at the Royal Institute for Governance and Strategic Studies in Bhutan.

Sonam Kinga obtained his Ph.D. Area Studies from Kyoto University, Japan.

He started his career as a Publication Officer at the Curriculum Division of Ministry of Education in 1998. Later, he worked as Research Officer with the Centre for Bhutan Studies, Senior Program Officer with Save the Children US, Thimphu and Executive Editor for Bhutan Observer (private newspaper).

After his election to the National Council during the historic parliamentary elections of 2008, he served as the deputy chairperson between 2008 and 2013. He also served as Chairperson of the Good Governance Committee and House Committee. He was the Chairperson of the National Council from May 2013 to May 2018.

An academic, his research and publications have focused on Bhutanese history, foreign relations, society, politics, culture and oral literature.

== Honours ==
- Bhutan:
  - The Royal Red Scarf (17 December 2012).
  - National Order of Merit [in Gold] (17 December 2014).
