= Haa District =

District of Bhutan

Coordinates: 27°15′N 89°10′E

Haa District ཧཱ་རྫོང་ཁག།
- District
- Location of Haa district within Bhutan
- Country: Bhutan
- Headquarters: Ha

Area
  - Total: 1,905 km^{2} (736 sq mi)

Population (2017)
  - Total: 13,655
  - Density: 7.168/km^{2} (18.56/sq mi)
- Time zone: UTC+6 (BTT)
- HDI (2019): 0.702 high · 3rd
- Website: www.haa.gov.bt

Haa District (Dzongkha: ཧཱ་རྫོང་ཁག།; Wylie: Haa rzong-khag; alternative spellings include "Ha", also called "Hidden-Land Rice Valley.") is one of the 20 dzongkhag or districts comprising Bhutan. It the second least-populated dzongkhag in the country after Gasa.

The most-spoken language of the district is Dzongkha, the official and national language of Bhutan.

The river Haa Chhu, originating at Jomolhari mountain, flows through the district.

== Mystical history of Haa ==
The name Haa (pronounced "hah"), as well as the more ancient name Has (Dzongkha: ཧས་; Wylie: Has; pronounced "hay"), connotes esoteric hiddenness. Haa's major feature is the Haa Valley, a steep north–south valley with a narrow floor. The district is presided over by three mountains collectively referred as "Three Brothers" -- Jampelyang, Chana-Dorji, and Chenrezig.

=== Black, White, and Haa Gonpa temples ===
Local historians maintain that two important temples in Haa District, the Black Temple (lhakhang Nagpo) and the White Temple (lhakhang karpo), were built at the same time as Kyerchu Temple in Paro in the 7th century AD. The two temples can be found near each other at the sacred site known as Miri Punsum, or "The Three Brother Hills". A third temple, Haa Gonpa, was built further up the valley at the site where, according to legend, a bodhisattva, disguised as a lame pigeon, was found by a local farmer who was drawn to the spot by a mysterious fire seen on several successive nights and by the unexplained sounds of oboes and trumpets (musical instruments closely associated with Bhutanese and Tibetan monasteries).

During the 10th day of the 11th month of the Bhutanese calendar (see Tibetan calendar), liturgical ceremonies worshipping Amitabha Buddha are held at Haa Gonpa temple.

=== Sacred oak and the upper house ===
According to legend, near the Black Temple there are two houses close to a sacred oak tree where the local deity once appeared as a winged creature, scaring the local people (the valley is divided into a number of areas, each under the influence of a particular local deity predating the arrival of Buddhism — see Bön religion). The residents of the two houses gave offerings to the local deity. The local deity, now appeased, visited the upper house while neglecting the lower. The jealous owner of the lower house began a feud in which a man of the upper house was killed. Every year 11th lunar month a series of special mystical practices are performed in the upper house for a week.

=== The local deity Chungdue ===
The famous Lam Pema Lingpa also documented what was supposedly the activities of another local deity known as Aup Chungdue. Chungdue was said to be responsible for meteor storms, cyclones, wildfires, rocks splitting apart, earthquakes, and a number of other disasters. The Guru Padmasambhava arrived in the late 8th century and subdued the deity. In the 15th century aup Chungdue decreed that the people of Ha Shogona village where not to come in contact with any followers of a certain monk in nearby Paro dzongkhag. According to the story, a young Haa man married a girl from Paro, and, unsuspecting, as they crossed a river between the two districts, the knots tying her infant to her back came loose and the baby fell into the river and drowned.

=== Other features ===
Neat the Black and White temples is a special stupa chorten marking the site where an imprint of Guru Padmasambhava's body and hat may be found in a large rock.

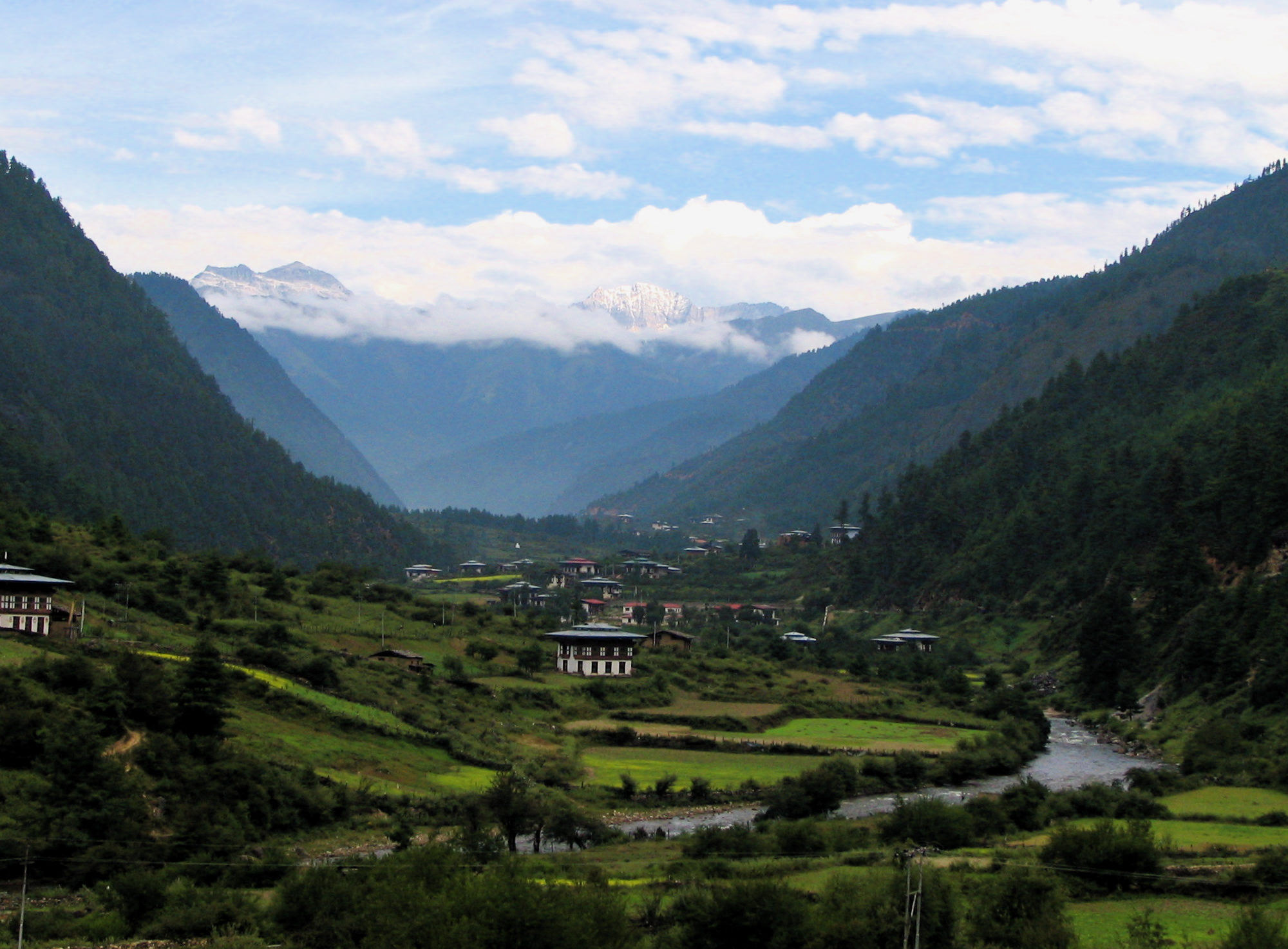
Haa Valley looking north, September, 2006

In the Samar side-valley may be found a bridge known as Has Samarpudung. Below the bridge is the lake of a wishing cow whose stone udders can be seen in the lake.

== Population ==
According to Census 2017, the population of the district was 13,655 in 2,952 households, making it the second-least-populated dzongkhag in the country after Gasa.

== Economy ==
=== Pastoralism ===
In the northern part of the district, a temperate alpine area, yak rearing is the most sustainable occupation. Natural selection has given the yak a physiological design that makes its adaption to high mountains unrivalled by any other livestock. The pastoralists were inclined to keep an unexpectedly high number of male yaks due to the high price of yak meat. In 1993, the price for boneless yak meat stood at Nu 65 per kilogram, i.e. more than four times higher than beef. In the northern gewogs, the population also depend on making butter and cheese for their livelihood.

=== Agriculture ===
Most of the district is unsuitable for agriculture. Traditionally, the main cereals grown in the dzongkhag was bitter and sweet buckwheat, barley, and wheat. In 2018, the cultivable land was around 2% of the total area in the district. Agriculture is further constrained by the prolonged winter and shorter growing seasons. Wheat is the main cereal crop grown in the district; other cereals crops are bitter barley and sweet buckwheat. Some rice is grown in the lower reaches of the valley. Potatoes, chilis, apples and other cash crops are grown by farmers on the valley floor, along terraced hillsides, and in some of the more accessible side valleys. Per the census, almost every household owns livestock of some type, most commonly yaks and cattle, but also chickens, pig, and horses. In the southern part of the district, cardamom and ginger constitute principal cash crops, while potato serves as the main cash crop in the north. Apples and vegetables are also cultivated on a moderate scale.

Cultivated area, production, and yield of major crops.
Crop/Production		2013	2014	2015	2016	2017
Wheat	Area (acres)	571.00	560.00	485.00	562.00	418.00
	Production (metric tonnes)	405.00	400.00	357.00	313.56	155.00
	Yield (kg/acre)	710.00	715.00	736.00	522.00	500.00
Barley	Area (acres)	35.00	41.00	61.00	8.50	22.00
	Production (metric tonnes)	27.00	25.00	34.00	7.15	8.00
	Yield (kg/acre)	767.00	611.00	566.00	668.25	352.00
Paddy	Area (acres)	143.00	138.00	174.00	131.06	179.00
	Production (metric tonnes)	178.00	178.00	237.00	167.57	224.00
	Yield (kg/acre)	1247.00	1230.00	1361.00	1302.75	1270.00
Maize	Area (acres)	330.00	300.00	223.00	261.38	166.00
	Production (metric tonnes)	329.00	255.00	189.00	308.72	145.00
	Yield (kg/acre)	994.00	850.00	848.00	1243.93	878.00
Buckwheat	Area (acres)	490.00	349.00	746.00	427.94	423.00
	Production (metric tonnes)	319.00	266.00	484.00	221.17	193.00
	Yield (kg/acre)	650.00	648.00	648.00	1009.13	455.00
Millet	Area (acres)	122.00	79.00	70.00	55.00	52.00
	Production (metric tonnes)	47.00	29.00	41.00	20.05	24.00
	Yield (kg/acre)	390.00	371.00	590.00	364.50	468.00

78% of Haa is covered with forest, and forestry plays an important part in local economy.

== Geography ==
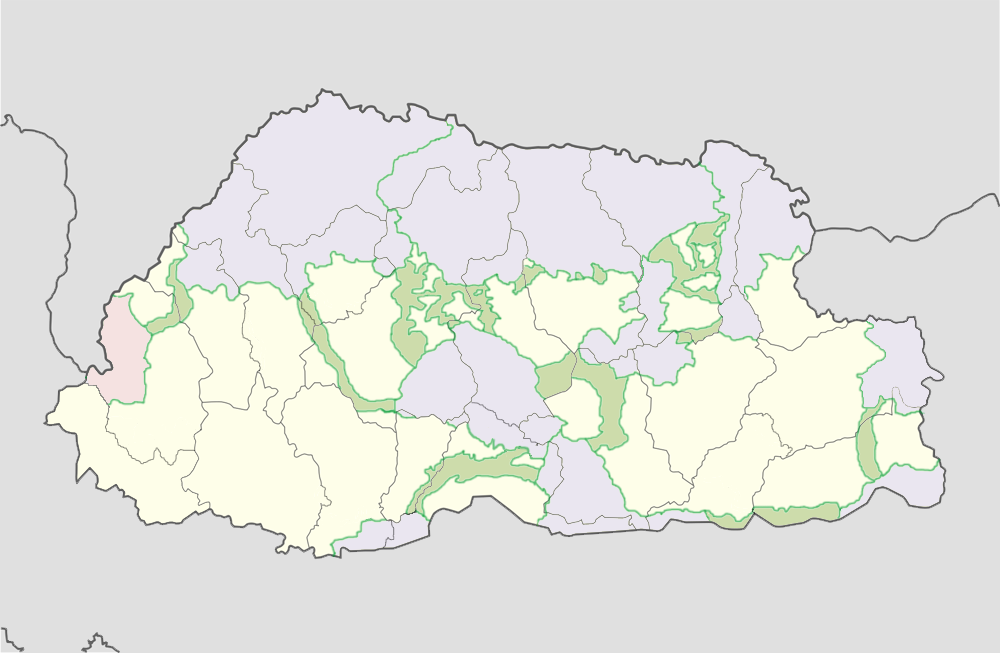
Torsa Strict Nature Reserve (shaded pink) has no human inhabitants.

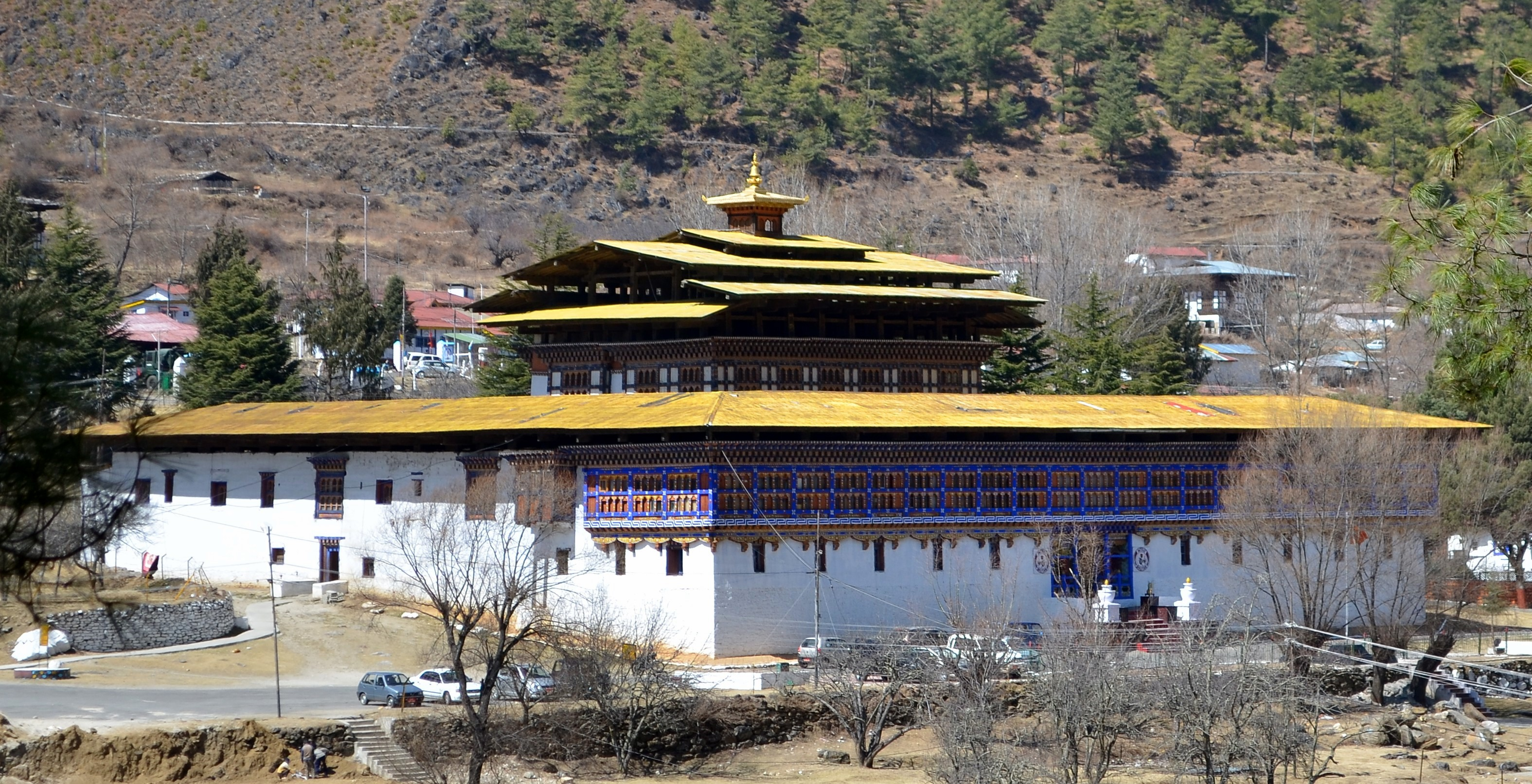
Haa Dzong, March, 2011

Haa District lies along the western border of Bhutan. To the northwest it is bounded by Tibet, to the southwest by Samtse District, to the southeast by Chukha District, and to the northeast by Paro District. Haa Dzongkhag covers a total area of 1905 km^{2}. The southern part of the district covers some sub-tropical area. However, the district is largely a temperate alpine area. Its northern part is above the tree line.

The gewogs of Bji, Katsho, Eusu, and Samar are in the north while Gakidling and Sombaykha are in the south.

== Administrative divisions ==
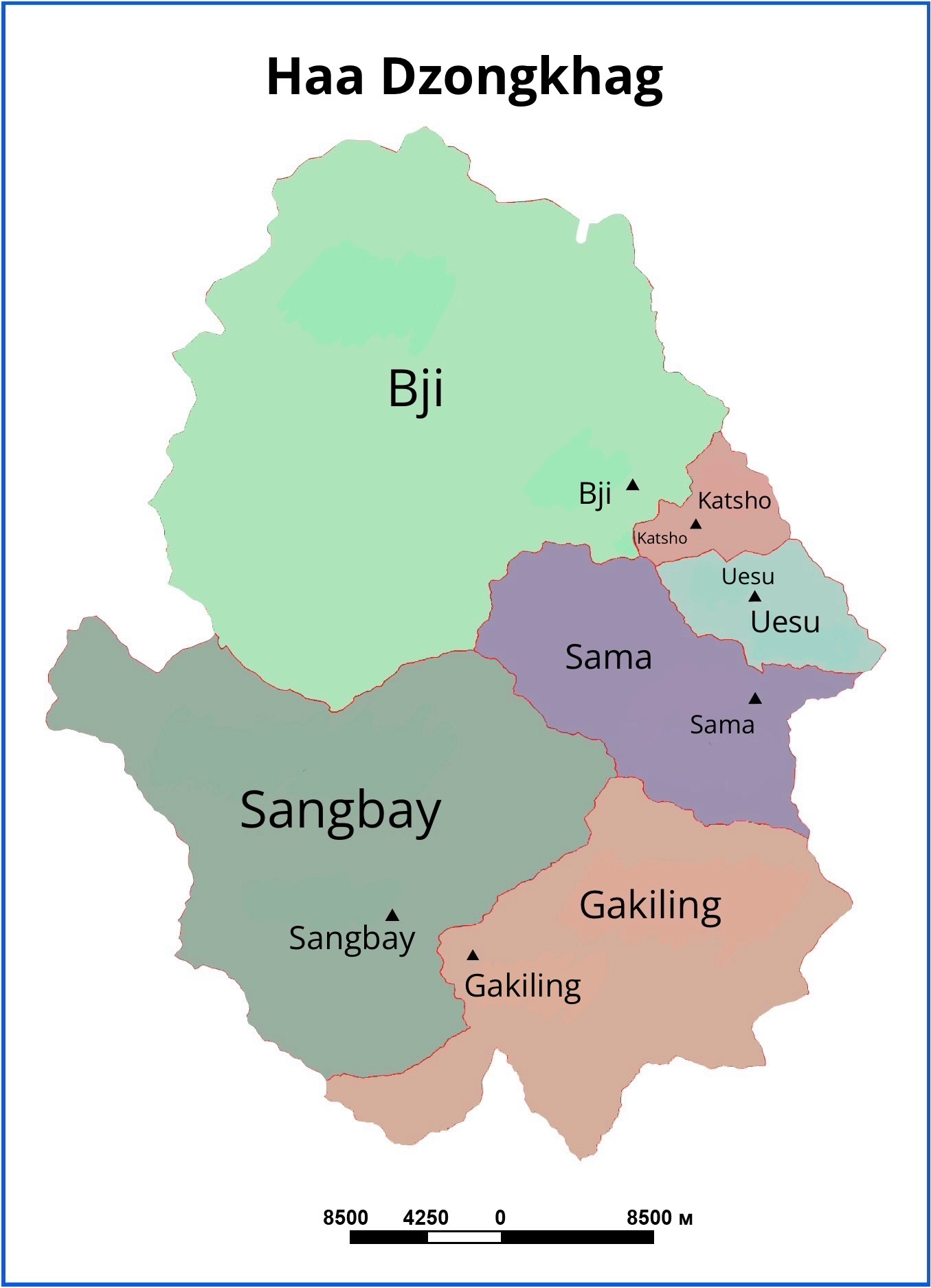
Map of Gewogs of Haa Dzongkhag

Haa District is divided into six village blocks (or gewogs):

- Bji Gewog
- Gakiling Gewog
- Katsho Gewog
- Sama Gewog
- Sangbay Gewog
- Uesu Gewog

== Tourism ==
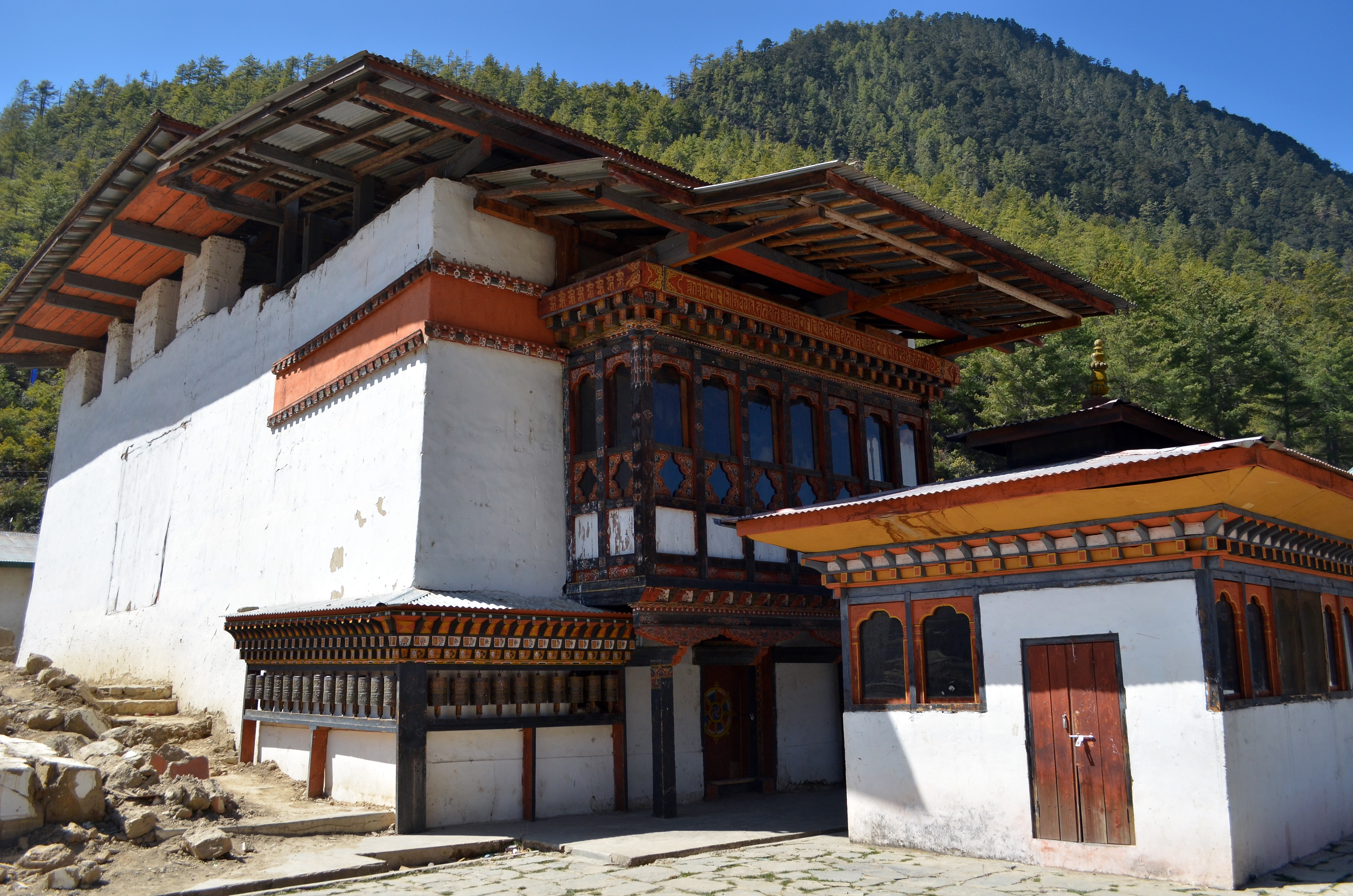
Lhakhang Karpo (the White Temple) in Üsu (Uesu) Gewog, Haa, Bhutan. Believed to have originally been established in the 7th century, during the time of the Tibetan Emperor Songtsän Gampo. The temple and its surrounding buildings normally house the monastic assembly ("monk body") of Haa District. This photograph was taken in 2011 while the temple complex was undergoing extensive restoration and re-construction.

In 2002, subsequent to the 79th session of the National Assembly, the valley was opened to foreign tourism. The dzongkhag has 41 lhakhangs, which are owned by the government, community, and private individuals. The Bje, Kar-tshog, Eusu and Samar Gewogs are all within a 15 km radius of the dzongkhag administration. They have fairly good road network, electricity, telephone connectivity, water supply, and health facilities.

List of festival dates in Haa dzongkhag
Festival	Location	Bhutanese dates	Remarks
Haa Tsechu	Lhakhang Karpo, Uesu	8th-10th day of the 8th month	Three-day annual festival
Lomba	Celebrated throughout the Haa valley	29th day of the 10th month till the 2nd of the 11th month	People prepare a special local delicacy called ‘Hoentey’, a dumpling made out of sweet buckwheat, flour, and green turnip leaves. The celebration is followed by a community archery game.
Yongto Bongko, Kibri Bongko, Dumchu Bongko, Tshaphel Bongku, and Kana Bongku	Yongto, Kibri, Dumchu, Tshaphel, and Kana	Begins on the 17th day of the 11th month	The shaman festival is organised every three years by the communities.
Wangtsa Goencham	Wangtsa Lhakhang, Katsho	1st day of the 11th month	Community festival
Tshenka Wango	Tshenka lhakhang, Jenkakha – Bjee	15th day of the 11th month	Annual celebration in which people from Paro also participate.
Haa Summer Festival	Imtrat grounds	July 13–16 every year	

The Haa District is often a destination for tourists, given its scenery and rich cultural heritage. Attractions in the district include:

Cultural Exploration:

The Haa District is known for its rich cultural heritage, including its various festivals, monasteries, and traditional architecture. Some of the prominent cultural attractions include:

- 'Lhakhang Karpo and Nagpo: These twin temples, also known as the White and Black Temples, are considered sacred and are an important pilgrimage site. They showcase intricate Bhutanese architecture.
- 'Rongtse Nye: Rangtse Ney is a sacred abode of Guru Rinpoche and Khandro Yeshe Tsogyel in Haa district at an altitude of 1200 meters.
- 'Haa Summer Festival': Held annually in July, this festival celebrates the culture and traditions of the Haa Valley. It features traditional music, dance performances, local cuisine, and exhibitions of traditional crafts.
- 'Tagchu Goemba: Located on a hilltop, this ancient monastery has extensive views of the Haa Valley. Visitors can explore its surroundings, wall paintings, and engage with the resident monks to learn about Buddhism in Bhutan.

Nature and Attractions:

Some popular activities for tourists in the Haa District include:

- Hiking and Trekking: The district has a number of trails for hiking and trekking, like the Haa Wangchulo Dzongkhag Trek and the Shekhar Drak Trek.
- Haa valley–Saga La–Drukgyal Dzong trek is a trek of 23 km that can be covered in two to three days. This trek is also called the 'Haa Planters' Trail' as it was used by rice planters from the valley to reach Paro to work as farm labourers during the planting season (mainly May–June). In return, the people of Haa received red rice after the autumn harvest. The trek passes through villages in the valley and dense forests near Paro. The trek ends near Drukgyal Dzong. On a three-day trek, one can stop at Yangtong. Alternatively, one can also stay at Khadey Ghom. The trek on the second day can end at Dongney Tsho.
- The ‘Haa Panorama Hiking Trail’ (HPHT) is a one-day hiking trail that overlooks four major monasteries of upper Haa: Yangthang, Katsho, Dranadingkha and Takchu goenpas^{[1]}. ----^{[1]} https://kuenselonline.com/a-new-trail-to-explore-in-haa/

Other treks that start from the valley include Haa valley–Nub Shona Patta Tho–Rigona, and Haa Valley–Amo Chhu–Phuentsholing.

== Environment ==
Haa contains Torsa Strict Nature Reserve, one of the environmentally protected areas of Bhutan. Torsa contains no human inhabitants other than military patrols and posts, occupying substantial portions of the gewogs of Bji and Sangbay. Torsa is connected to Jigme Dorji National Park via biological corridor, cutting across the northeastern half of Haa District.

== Military ==
The Indian Army maintains a military base in the valley to maintain security against incursions from China. The Chinese military has built roads into the Torsa Strict Nature Reserve and Haa District over the past dozen years visible on Google Earth/Maps and other viewing platforms.

== Climate ==
Climate data for Haa-Namjayling, elevation 2,720 m (8,920 ft), (1991–2017 normals)
Month	Jan	Feb	Mar	Apr	May	Jun	Jul	Aug	Sep	Oct	Nov	Dec	Year
Record high °C (°F)	22.0 (71.6)	20.5 (68.9)	25.0 (77.0)	24.0 (75.2)	26.5 (79.7)	26.5 (79.7)	28.5 (83.3)	29.5 (85.1)	26.5 (79.7)	25.0 (77.0)	22.0 (71.6)	22.5 (72.5)	29.5 (85.1)
Mean daily maximum °C (°F)	10.5 (50.9)	11.2 (52.2)	13.5 (56.3)	15.7 (60.3)	18.2 (64.8)	20.5 (68.9)	20.8 (69.4)	20.7 (69.3)	19.2 (66.6)	16.9 (62.4)	14.4 (57.9)	12.3 (54.1)	16.2 (61.1)
Daily mean °C (°F)	2.6 (36.7)	4.1 (39.4)	7.2 (45.0)	10.2 (50.4)	13.5 (56.3)	16.5 (61.7)	17.5 (63.5)	17.1 (62.8)	15.4 (59.7)	11.2 (52.2)	7.1 (44.8)	4.3 (39.7)	10.6 (51.0)
Mean daily minimum °C (°F)	−5.4 (22.3)	−3.0 (26.6)	0.8 (33.4)	4.7 (40.5)	8.7 (47.7)	12.5 (54.5)	14.1 (57.4)	13.5 (56.3)	11.6 (52.9)	5.4 (41.7)	−0.2 (31.6)	−3.7 (25.3)	4.9 (40.9)
Record low °C (°F)	−14.5 (5.9)	−12.0 (10.4)	−7.0 (19.4)	−5.0 (23.0)	0.5 (32.9)	5.5 (41.9)	6.5 (43.7)	7.0 (44.6)	1.5 (34.7)	−5.5 (22.1)	−8.0 (17.6)	−11.5 (11.3)	−14.5 (5.9)
Average rainfall mm (inches)	10.8 (0.43)	17.0 (0.67)	34.8 (1.37)	63.5 (2.50)	72.3 (2.85)	128.2 (5.05)	185.8 (7.31)	173.5 (6.83)	129.4 (5.09)	60.2 (2.37)	2.9 (0.11)	5.5 (0.22)	883.9 (34.8)
Average relative humidity (%)	71.4	68.1	63.8	65.3	68.4	74.4	78.8	78.9	76.9	71.5	61.2	66.0	70.4
Source: National Center for Hydrology and Meteorology

== See also ==
- Districts of Bhutan
- Paro Province

== Sources ==
- Tshewang, Lam Pema (2001) History of the Has (Ha) Valley in Journal of Bhutan Studies Volume 5, Winter 2001 p. 50-56. Thimphu: Center for Bhutan Studies.
- Seeds of Faith: A Comprehensive Guide to the Sacred Places of Bhutan. Vol 1. 2008 KMT Publishers, Thimphu, Bhutan.
