= Nima (politician) =

Bhutanese politician

- ཉི་མ།

Member of the National Council of Bhutan
- Incumbent
- Assumed office 10 May 2018
- Preceded by: himself
- Constituency: Bumthang
- In office 2013–2018
- Preceded by: Tshewang Jurmin
- Constituency: Bumthang

Personal details
- Born: 1978 or 1979 (age 47–48)

Nima (born 1978 or 1979 (age 47–48)) (Dzongkha: ཉི་མ།) is a Bhutanese politician who has been a member of the National Council of Bhutan, since May 2018. Previously, he was a member of the National Council of Bhutan from 2013 to 2018.

== Education ==
He holds a Master of Arts degree in Human Services Counseling and a Bachelor of Arts (Hons) degree in Geography.
