= National Council (Bhutan) =

Upper house of the Parliament of Bhutan

Coordinates: 27°29′23″N 89°38′17″E

National Council རྒྱལ་ཡོངས་ཚོགས་སྡེ་ Gyelyong Tshogde

Type
- Type: Non-partisan upper house

Leadership
- Chairperson: Sangay Dorji since 10 May 2023

Structure
- Seats: 25
- Political groups: Non-partisan (20) Appointed (5)
- Length of term: 5 years

Elections
- Voting system: 20 seats by first-past-the-post, 5 nominated by the Druk Gyalpo
- Last election: 20 April 2023

Meeting place
- Gyelyong Tshokhang, Thimphu

Website
- Official Website of the National Council of Bhutan

The National Council is the upper house of Bhutan's bicameral Parliament, which also comprises the Druk Gyalpo (Dragon King) and the National Assembly.

While sharing similarities to the Rajya Sabha of neighbouring India and the upper houses of other bicameral Westminster-style parliaments, it cannot author monetary or budget-related bills, differing from others, its twenty Members are elected by the people of the twenty districts in a multi-layered election process with each block electing a nominee for the final district level elections. Besides creating and reviewing Bhutanese legislation, the National Council acts as the house of review on matters affecting the security, sovereignty, or interests of Bhutan that need to be brought to the notice of the Druk Gyalpo, the Prime Minister and the National Assembly. Twenty members of the first Council were elected in the first ever elections for the Council held on December 31, 2007, and January 29, 2008.

== Membership ==
The National Council consists of twenty-five members. Twenty members are elected by the electorates of the twenty districts using first-past-the-post, while five members are nominated by the Druk Gyalpo. The members cannot belong to any political party and must have graduated from a recognised university. (Art. 11)

The members of the first National Council were generally young, many of them aged below 40. This is reportedly because only persons holding a degree were allowed to be candidates, and that access to formal education is relatively recent in Bhutan.

== Chairpersons ==
Complete list of the chairpersons of the National Council.

Name	Took office	Left office	Notes
Namgay Penjore (b. 1966)	29 April 2008	28 April 2013	
Sonam Kinga (b. 1973)	10 May 2013	9 May 2018	
Tashi Dorji (b. 1981)	10 May 2018	10 May 2023	
Sangay Dorji (b. 1981)	10 May 2023	Incumbent	

== History ==
The National Council was preceded by the Royal Advisory Council (Lodey Tshogdey), mentioned in Bhutanese legislation as early as 1953. From the outset, members of the Royal Advisory Council were concurrently members of the unicameral National Assembly (the Tshogdu; cf. Bhutan's modern National Assembly). The Royal Advisory Council was formally established in 1965 to advise the Druk Gyalpo and ministers and to supervise the implementation of programs and policies enacted by the National Assembly. The Royal Advisory Council came to be a consultative and advisory body. Six members of the National Council were elected democratically, two were elected by the clergy, and one was nominated by the Druk Gyalpo to function as chair. Monk representatives, according to 1979 regulations for Council membership, were required to be literate and "highly knowledgeable about the Drukpa Kargyupa religion". Monk nominees were subject to the approval of the speaker of the National Assembly. The regional representatives were elected by the National Assembly from a list endorsed by village assemblies. They were required to be literate, knowledgeable about Bhutanese traditional culture and customs. As the principal consulting body to the Druk Gyalpo, the Royal Advisory Council was a key state organization and interacted most directly with the National Assembly.

The first Cabinet of Bhutan consisted of the Royal Advisory Council along with the Council of Ministers (now the Lhengye Zhungtshog). Its members were collectively responsible to His Majesty the King and the National Assembly (Tshogdu).

The National Council was established in 2008 under Article 11 of the Constitution of Bhutan, which does not mention the Royal Advisory Council. The subsequent National Council Act of 2008 codified the National Council's independent statutory basis. Part of this framework included an explicit repeal of "all other laws in relation to the Royal Advisory Council". The National Council Act sets forth qualifications; meeting, presentment, debate, and voting procedures; committee and rulemaking authority; and censure, removal, and other penalties for the members of the National Council. The Act also establishes a chairperson, a deputy chairperson, and a royally appointed Secretary General for the administration of the National Council.

The first joint sitting of Parliament, including the National Council, was held from May 8 to May 30, 2008. The first session of the National Council was held from June 17 to July 24, 2008.

== See also ==
- Parliament of Bhutan
  - National Assembly of Bhutan
- Tshogdu
- Constitution of Bhutan
- Politics of Bhutan
- Bhutanese legislation
