= Tangmachu =

Tangmachu སྟག་མོ་ཆུ
- Location in Bhutan
- Coordinates: 27°36′N 91°11′E
- Country: Bhutan
- District: Lhuntse District
- Village block: Menbi Gewog

Population
  - Total: 587
- Time zone: UTC+6 (BTT)

Tangmachu also spelt Tagmochhu, is a town in Lhuntse District in northeastern Bhutan. It is the seat of Menbi Gewog.

== History ==
Origin of the name is attributed to Drupthop Ngagchang Takrelchan who according to oral tradition named a pond Tagmo meaning Tigress and chhu meaning water after witnessing a Tigress drink from it.

Tangmachu was the seat for the Tangmachu Dungwog under the Dual System, it comprised mordern Menbi, Metsho and Jaray gewogs. It had about 300 taxpaying households in 1747.

== Demographics ==
In the Gewog census, the population of Tangmachu was 587 people in 57 households. The majority of people speak a local dialect of Kurtöp and are the southernmost extend of the language.

== Economy ==
Rice farming is the dominant form of agriculture in the Tangmachu valley.

== Culture ==
Guru Nangsey Zilneon Statue in 2022

The main landmark in Tangmachu is the Guru Nangsa Zelnen Statue. Located in Takila village, it is the tallest statue of Padmasambhava in the world at 154 feet tall. The consturction of the statue was funded by Khenpo Karpo and Druk Odiyana Foundation with the cost of construction at more then 250 million Ngultrum.The construction began in March 2008 and finished in 2015. The Statue is divided into three floors with the Trulku Lhakhang on the ground floor, Longku Lhakhang in the second floor and Choeku Lhakhang at the top floor.

== Infrastructure ==
Maenbi Gewog centre road is the primary paved road in Tangmachhu. It is connected to Autsho by Mongar-Lhuentse Highway.

Tangmachu Central School is the only primary and secondary education school, it was established in 1994.
