= Khoma (disambiguation) =

Khoma is a progressive and alternative metal musical group from Sweden.

Khoma may also refer to

- Khoma (given name), Ukrainian given name
- Khoma, Bhutan, village in Bhutan
- Khoma (surname), Ukrainian surname
