= Kinga Penjor =

Bhutanese politician

Member of the National Assembly of Bhutan
- Incumbent
- Assumed office 31 October 2018
- Preceded by: Karma Rangdol
- Constituency: Gangzur-Minjey

Personal details
- Born: c. 1974 Gangzur Gewog
- Party: Druk Nyamrup Tshogpa (DNT)

Kinga Penjor is a Bhutanese politician who has been a member of the National Assembly of Bhutan, since October 2018.

== Education ==
He holds a BA (Hons) degree in Dzongkha.

== Political career ==
Before joining politics, he worked as a broadcast journalist.

Penjor ran unsuccessfully for the Lhuentse Dzongkhag in the 2018 Bhutanese National Council Election.

He was elected to the National Assembly of Bhutan as a candidate of DNT from Gangzur-Minjey constituency in 2018 Bhutanese National Assembly Election. He received 3,026 votes and defeated Tshering Dorji, a candidate of Druk Phuensum Tshogpa.
