= Thrumshing La =

Mountain pass in Bhutan

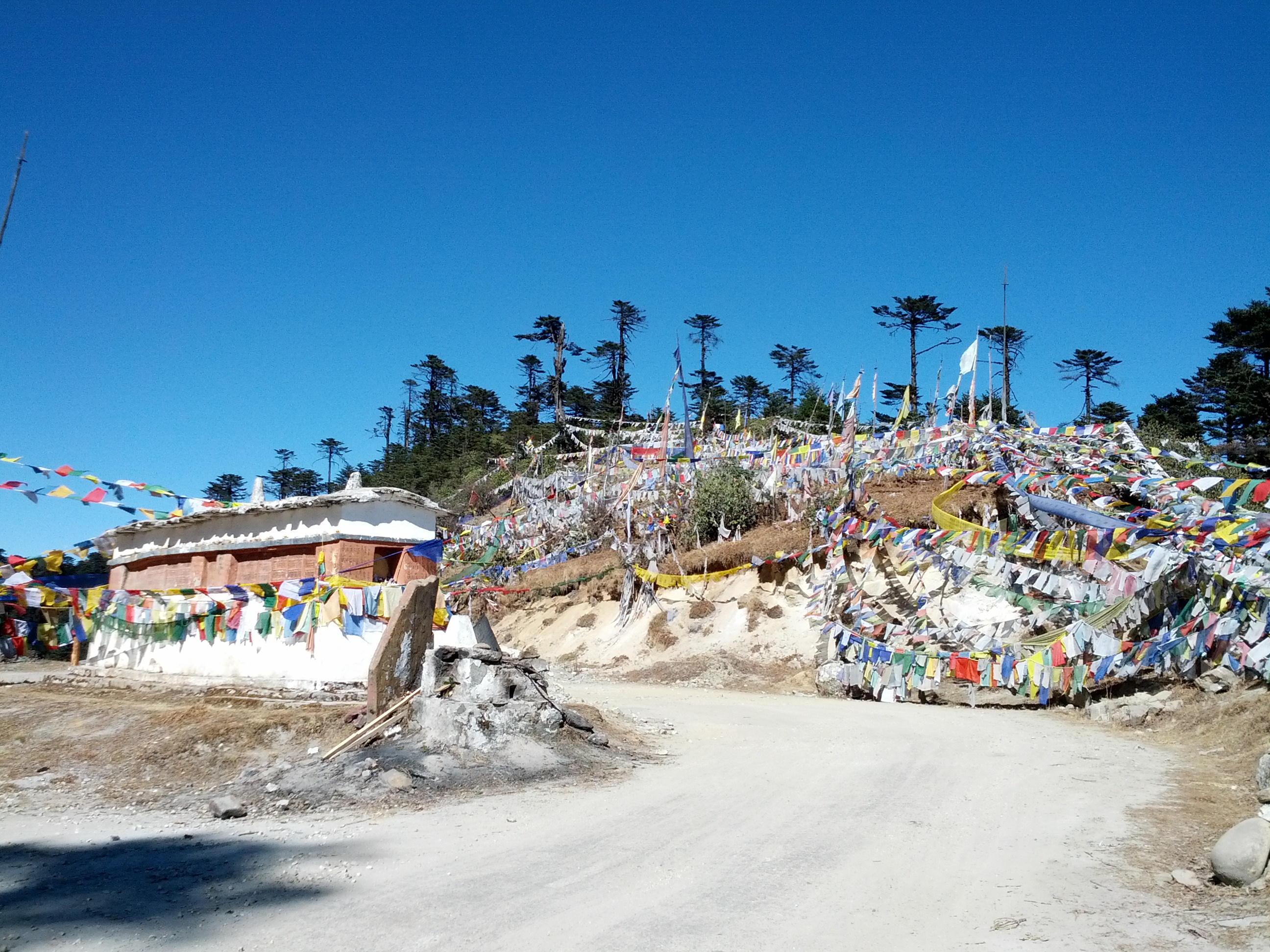
- View of the road at Thrumshing La

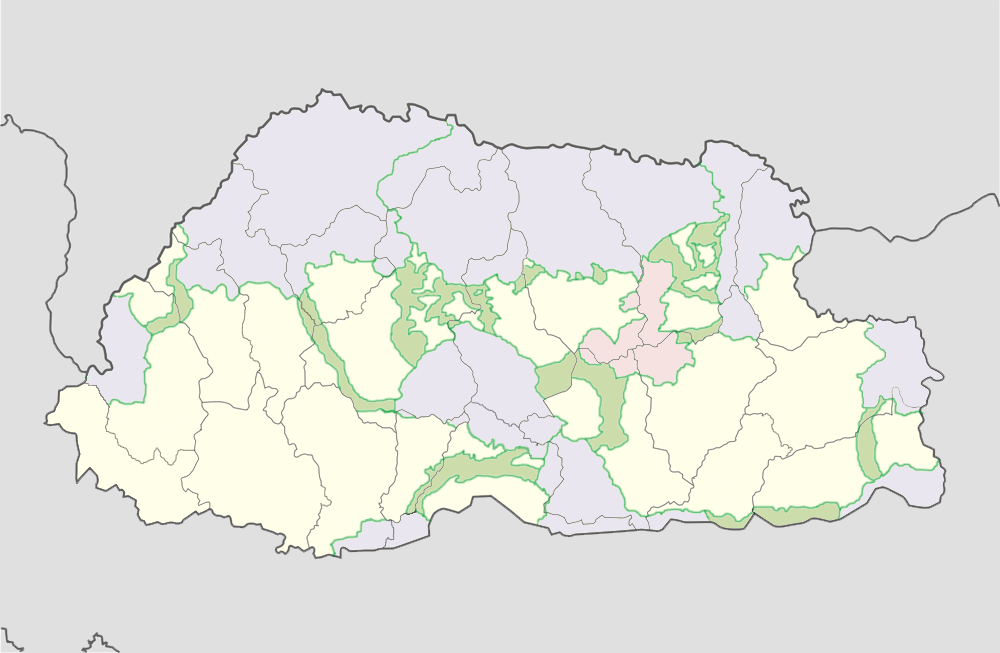
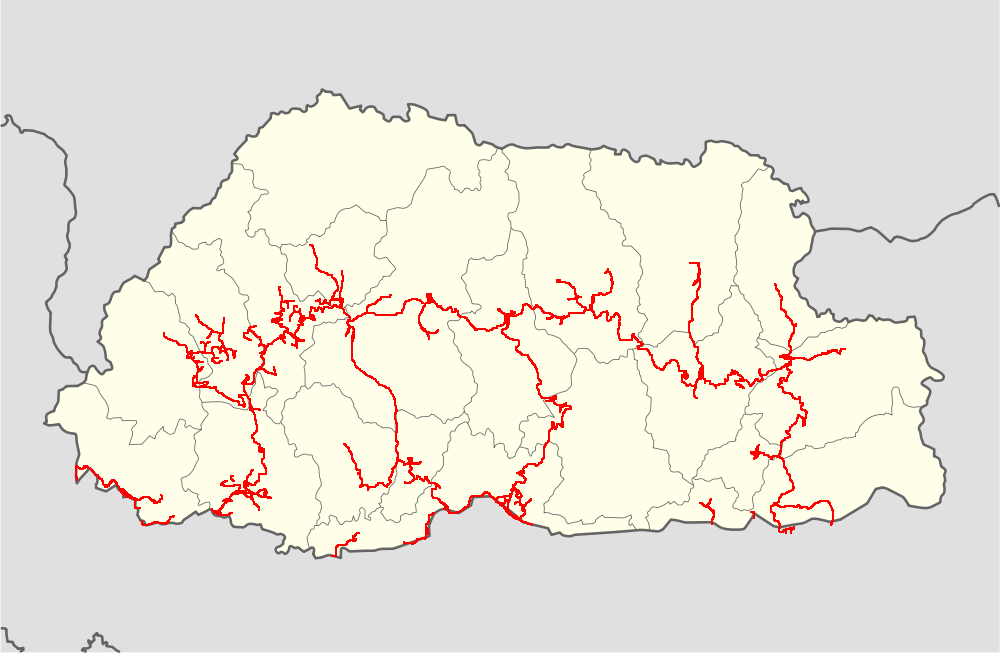
- Location of Thrumshing La within Thrumshingla National Park, Bhutan Thrumshing La on the Lateral Road
- Elevation: 3,780 metres (12,400 ft)

Third Approach
- Location: Ura Gewog, Bumthang District; Saling Gewog, Mongar District, Bhutan
- Range: Donga range
- Coordinates: 27°24′06″N 90°59′47″E

Thrumshing La, also called Thrumshingla Pass and Donga Pass, (Dzongkha: ཁྲུམས་ཤིང་ལ་; Wylie: khrums-shing la; "Thrumshing Pass"), is the second-highest mountain pass in Bhutan, connecting its central and eastern regions across the otherwise impregnable Donga range that has separated populations for centuries. It is located on a bend of the Lateral Road at the border of Bumthang District (Ura Gewog, leaving Ura southbound) and Mongar District (Saling Gewog, toward Sengor), along the border with Lhuntse District to the east. The Lateral Road bisects Thrumshingla National Park, named after the pass. The World Wildlife Fund also maintains operations in the park.

== Closures and hazards ==
The pass is often closed during winter due to heavy snowfall, shutting off land communication along the Lateral Road. During road closures, commercial and public vehicles are prohibited from attempting Thrumshing La, however private vehicles may proceed at their own risk. Blockages at this high altitude must be cleared by both heavy equipment and manual labor. At times, clearing crews have considerable difficulty even reaching the pass.

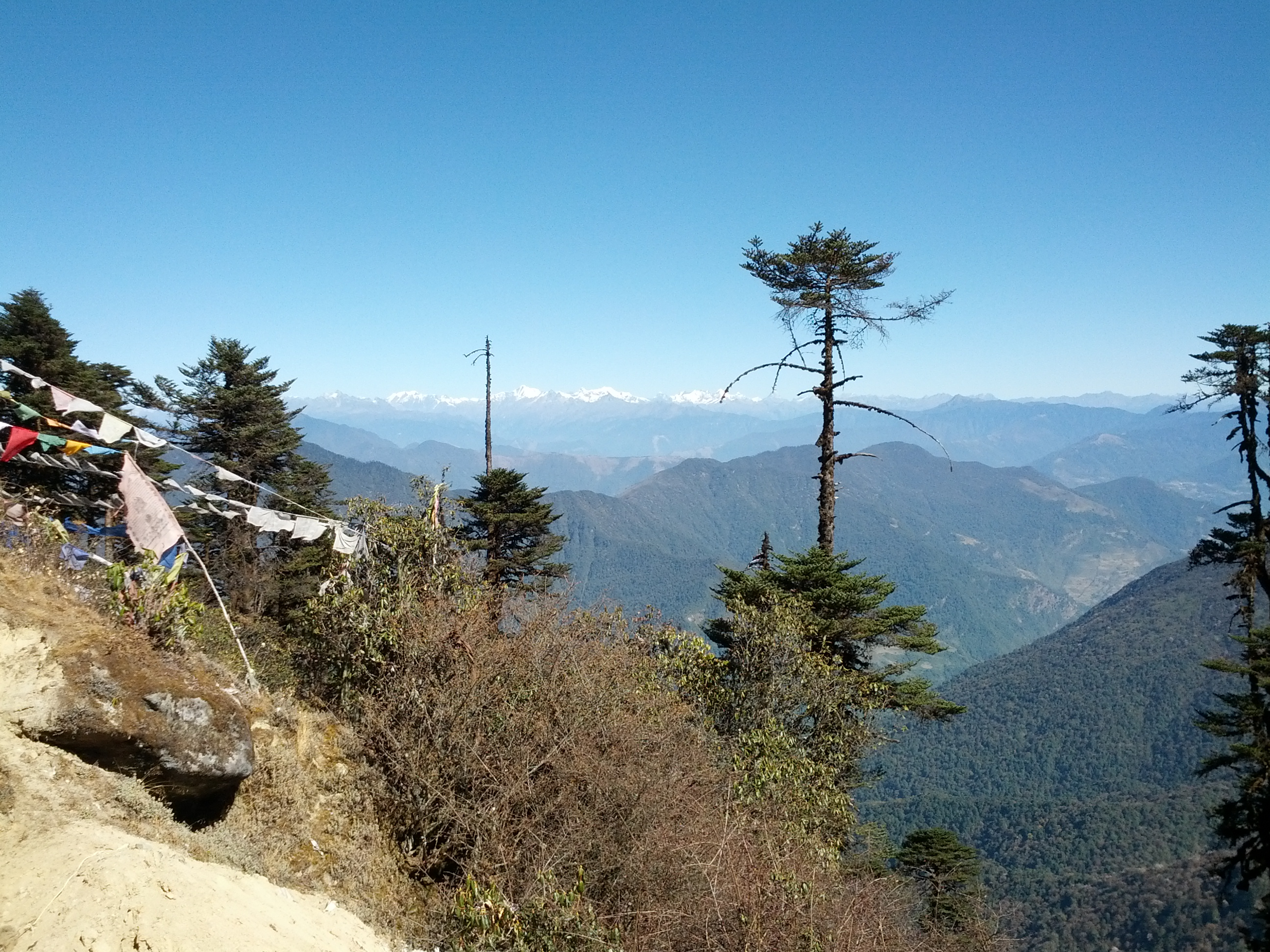
View from the pass

Along the pass, there are many sheer drops at the roadside. The terrain at the pass is barren and icy. At the highest point, travelers leave prayer flags in thanks for safe arrival to the pass. In a matter of hours, eastbound travelers descend the pass southward along the Lateral Road from elevations of nearly 3,800 metres (12,500 ft) to just 650 metres (2,130 ft), transitioning from alpine forests into semi-tropical orange producing valleys.

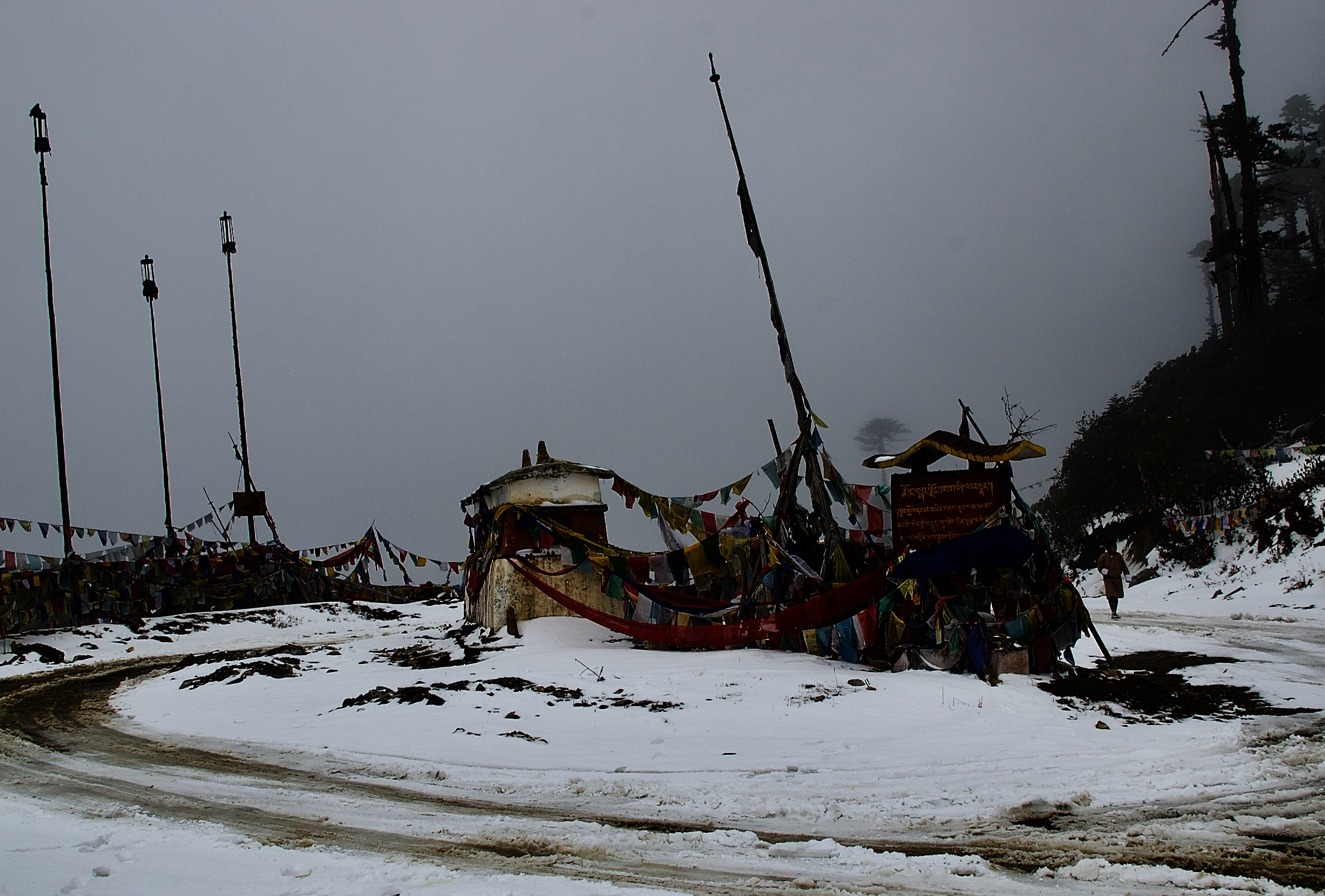
Thrumshingla Pass with snow

Because of the many nearby hazards and frequently dangerous conditions at Thrumshing La itself, the Government of Bhutan has approved and begun constructing a bypass to the Lateral Road as part of its Tenth Five Year Plan. The bypass will cut travel time, distance, and danger by avoiding Thrumshing La. The new route is expected to shorten travel time between Shingkhar village (Ura Gewog, Bumthang) and Gorgan (Menbi Gewog, Lhuntse) by 100 km and 3 hours. The new road construction met with fierce opposition by environmentalists; the government has chosen to proceed with construction nonetheless.

== See also ==
- Bumthang District
- Lateral Road
- Mongar District
- Thrumshingla National Park
