= Foma =

Foma may refer to:

- FOMA (Freedom of Mobile Multimedia Access), a Japanese mobile telecommunications service.
- Flag Officer Commanding Maharashtra Naval Area (FOMA), a senior appointment of the Indian Navy
- Foma, a term meaning "harmless untruths" from the fictional religion Bokononism in Kurt Vonnegut's novel Cat's Cradle
- Foma (given name), Russian male given name, variant of Thomas
- Foma (album), by The Nixons
- foma (software), an open-source compiler, programming language, and C library for constructing finite-state automata and transducers compatible with Xerox lexc and twolc
- Foma Bohemia, a manufacturer of photographic and industrial films, papers and chemicals in the Czech republic
- Foma language, a Bantu language of the Democratic Republic of the Congo
- Friends of Mount Athos (FoMA), a society that focuses on the monasteries of Mount Athos
- Olga Foma, Moldovan former footballer
