= Autsho =

Autsho ཨའུ་མཚོ
- Yenlag Thromde
- Autsho Chorten

- Location in Bhutan
- Coordinates: 27°26′36″N 91°10′24″E
- Country: Bhutan
- District: Lhuntse District
- Village block: Tsenkhar Gewog

Population (2017)
  - Total: 775

Autsho (Dzongkha: ཨའུ་མཚོ; Wylie: a'u mtsho) is a town in Lhuntse District in north-eastern Bhutan, near the border with Mongar District.

At the 2005 census its population was 301.

== Development ==
In 2014, Eastern Development Initiative would recognize Autsho as an possible regional hub as an Yenlag Thromde in the broader EDI plan for developing Eastern Bhutan. The Bhutanese government would approve the plans in 2015. The Lhuntse Dzongkhag Administration approved plans to create the satellite town in 2017, with residents beginning commercial vegetable farming on eight-acre area in the village. Autsho Central School would begin a special education programme from 2020 as part of a UNICEF initiative for inclusive education.

In late 2020, following a meeting between residents, Gewog and District officials, the Dzongkhag Administration would begin approving building permits. It would force multiple residents to vacate the leased state land for the Yenlag Thromde while the administration got approval for land allotment plans from the Ministry of Works and Human Settlement and the National Land Commission. This forced 50 shopkeepers in the town to move onto private land on rent near the proposed town area.

Autsho hositpal would be opened by 2023 following delays. There were 1,500 residents living around Autsho in 2024. In October 2026, the Bhutanese government would approve Nu 51.60 million for civil Infrastructure development in Phaling and Autsho.

== Culture ==
Autsho Namdroling Goenzin Dratshang is a Drukpa monastery located south of Autsho on a hill. It begun construction in 2002 and would be finished in 2019. It currently houses 150 monks.

== Infrastructure ==
Autsho is located along the Gangola-Lhuentse Secondary National Highway (SNH 10) which connects it to Mongar District.
