= Fomenko =

Fomenko is a (Cyrillic: Фоменко) is a Russian-language surname that corresponds to the Ukrainian surname Khomenko (Cyrillic: Хоменко) derived from the given name Khoma, or Thomas. The Russian form is derived from the corresponding name Foma (Russian: Фома).

Notable people with this surname include:

- Anatoly Fomenko (born 1945), Russian mathematician and topologist, known for his work on historical revisionism
- Arturas Fomenko (born 1977), Lithuanian football player
- Michael 'Tarzan' Fomenko (c.1930–2018), Georgian-born Australian bushman and recluse
- Mykhailo Fomenko (1948–2024), Ukrainian football coach and former player
- Nikolai Fomenko (born 1962), Russian rock musician and motor racer
- Pavel Fomenko (born 1976), Russian high jumper
- Sergey Fomenko (1902–1991), Soviet general
- Serhiy Fomenko, Ukrainian singer
- Yuliya Fomenko (born 1981), Russian backstroke swimmer

== See also ==
- Tomenko
