= Phrumsengla National Park =

National Park of Bhutan

Coordinates: 27°16′59″N 90°58′40″E

- IUCN category II (national park)
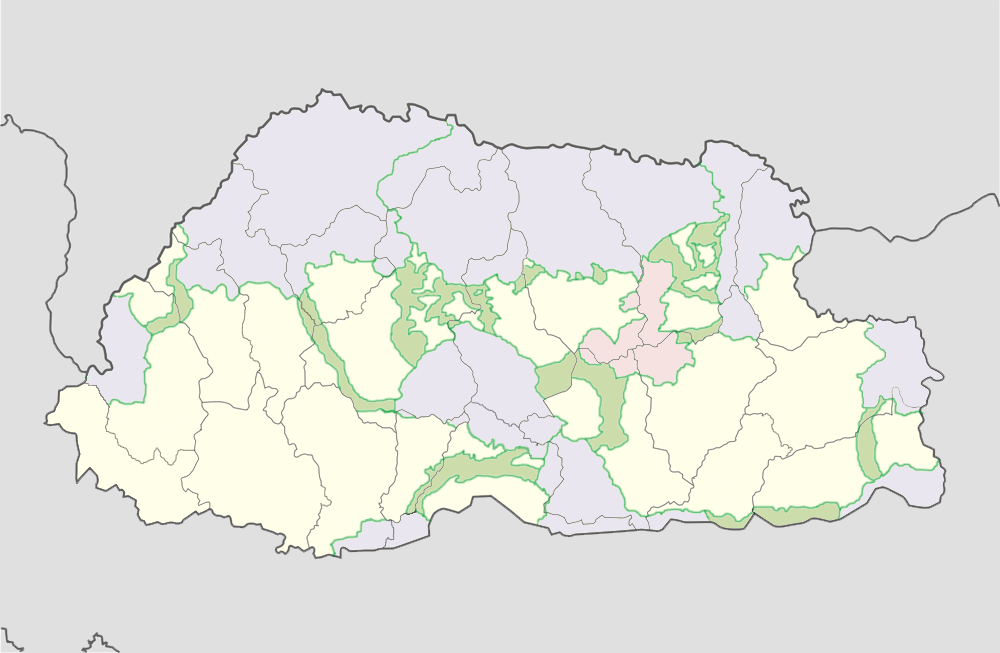
- Location: Bumthang, Lhuntse, Mongar, Zhemgang, Bhutan
- Area: 905.05 km^{2} (349.44 sq mi)
- Established: 1998
- Owner: Royal Government of Bhutan
- Website: Bhutan Trust Fund for Environmental Conservation

Phrumsengla National Park (Dzongkha: ཕུརམ་སེང་ལ་རྒྱལ་ཡོངས་གླིང་ག), formerly Thrumshingla National Park, in central Bhutan covers just over 905 square kilometres (349 sq mi) across four districts, but primarily in Mongar. It is bisected by the Lateral Road, and contains the Thrumshing La pass.

== Flora and fauna ==
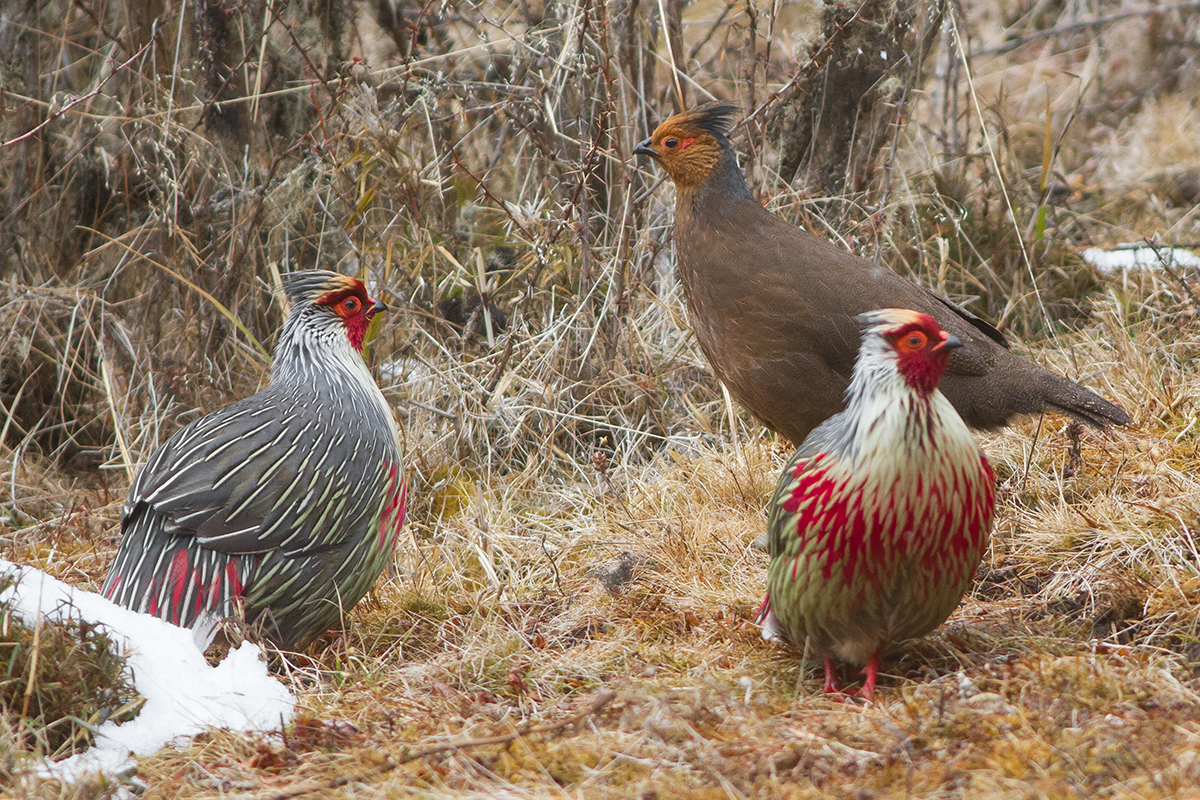
flock of Blood Pheasant

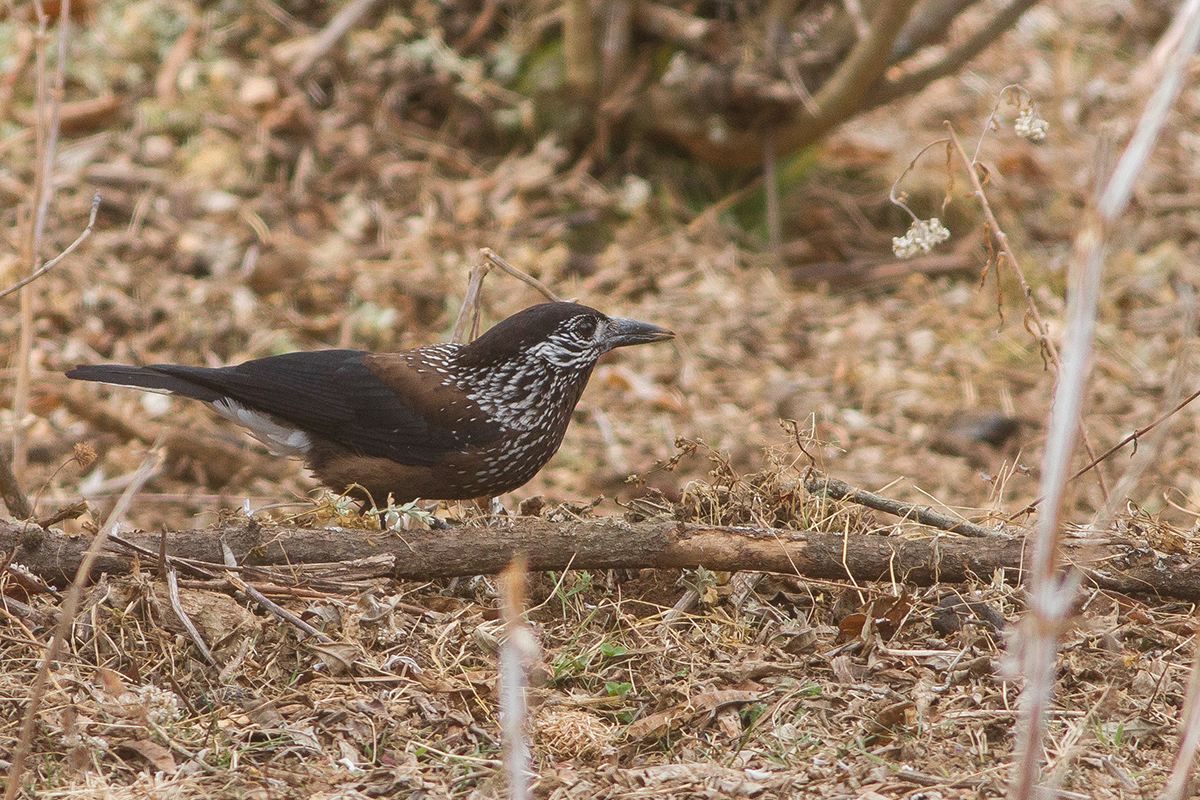
Southern Nutcracker

Phrumsengla is a temperate park in the foothills of the Himalaya, featuring large tracts of old-growth and fir forests, at altitudes ranging from 700 metres (2,300 ft) to 4,400 metres (14,400 ft) above sea level. Phrumsengla is home to several species of threatened birds, namely the rufous-necked hornbill (Aceros nipalensis), the rufous-throated wren-babbler (Spelaeornis caudatus), the satyr tragopan (Tragopan satyra), the beautiful nuthatch (Sitta formosa), Ward's trogon (Harpactes wardi) and the chestnut-breasted partridge (Arborophila mandellii), as well as a near-threatened species, the wedge-billed wren babbler (Sphenocichla humei).

Mammals in the area include various species native to South Asia and the Indian Subcontinent. There are large and small herbivorous ungulates, such as the Asian elephant (Elephas maximus), Indian rhinoceros (Rhinoceros unicornis) and the wild water buffalo (Bubalus arnee), as well as swamp deer, or barasingha (Rucervus duvaucelli), Himalayan goral (Naemorhedus goral), hog deer (Axis porcinus), mainland serow (Capricornis sumatraensis), and the northern red muntjac (Muntiacus vaginalis). Rodents and shrews are particularly plentiful in the region, with species including the Bhutan giant flying squirrel, black giant squirrel, Himalayan pika, Himalayan striped squirrel, Hodgson's giant flying squirrel, Irrawaddy squirrel, large-eared pika, moupin pika, Pallas's squirrel, northern treeshrew and the Sikkim mouse. Several primates and carnivores, including the elusive snow leopard (Panthera uncia) which roams the high, inaccessible peaks, are found here as well, such as Assamese and rhesus macaques and capped and Gee's golden langurs, dholes, Eurasian and smooth-coated otters, mainland leopard cats, and the yellow-throated marten.

Phrumsengla has many scenic views of its forests, with elevation dictating the climate, from alpine to sub-tropical. As the soil of Phrumsengla is particularly fragile, the land is unsuitable for logging or other development, thus it is left to nature.

== Tourism ==
The Bhutanese Trust Fund identifies excellent tourism potential for Phrumsengla, as it is bisected by Bhutan's highest motorable road, the Lateral Road. Nearly 11,000 people live within the Phrumsengla area demonstrating, in the Trust Fund's opinion, the kingdom's "closest success to a harmonious balance between man and nature". The World Wildlife Fund also maintains operations in the park.

== See also ==
- List of protected areas of Bhutan
- Thrumshing La
