= Lateral Road =

Road in Bhutan

East-West Highway Lateral Road
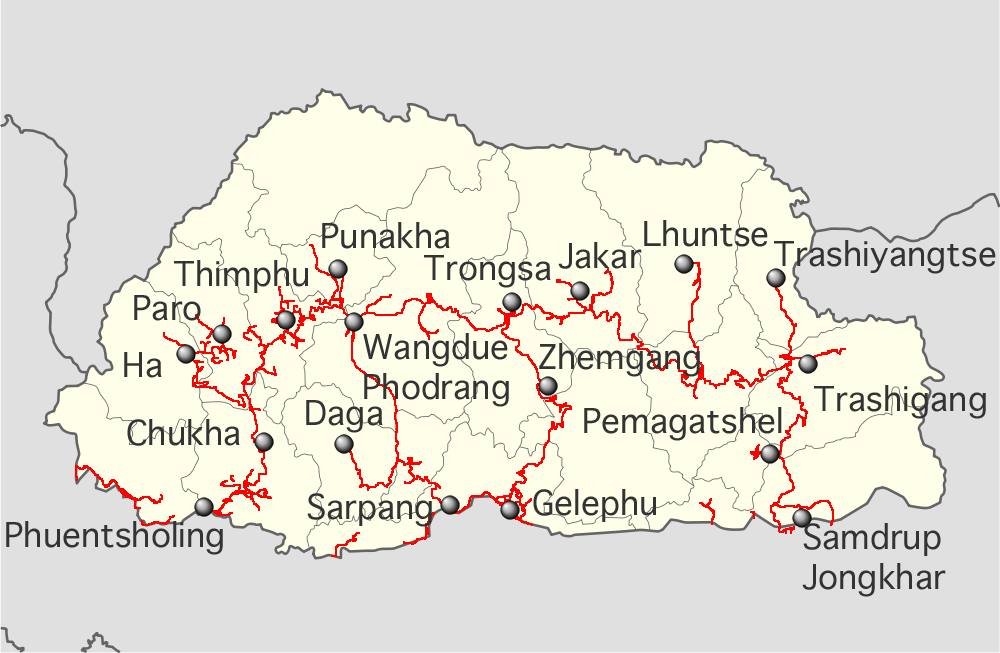

Route information
- Length: 713 km (443 mi) As of 2017. Bypasses under construction to shorten length. 636 km per Google Maps.

Major junctions
- Southwest end: Phuentsholing
- East end: Trashigang

Location
- Country: Bhutan

Highway system
- Transport in Bhutan

The East-West Highway, also known as the Lateral Road, is Bhutan's primary east–west corridor, connecting Phuentsholing in the southwest to Trashigang in the east. In between, the Lateral Road runs directly through Wangdue Phodrang, Trongsa, and other population centers. The Lateral Road also has spurs connecting to the capital Thimphu and other major population centers such as Paro and Punakha.

The Lateral Road traverses are a number of high passes, including Tremo La and Dochu La. The highest pass on the road is at Chele La; the second-highest pass is at Trumshing La in central Bhutan at an altitude of over 3,800 m (12,500 ft).

== The Lateral Road and society ==
The works that formed the Lateral Road, among other development projects, were fruits of mostly Indian and Nepali laborers. Their contributions were necessary to bolster Bhutanese national security and to connect populations. As the Lateral Road has led to increased infrastructure development, it has added to a sense of national unity, connecting various pockets of ethnic groups.

Most freight in Bhutan is moved along the highway on eight-ton 300 hp (224 kW) Tata trucks, which are often overloaded and which stress road conditions. There is a network of passenger buses, and the most common vehicle in government and private use is the four-wheel-drive pickup.

== Road safety ==
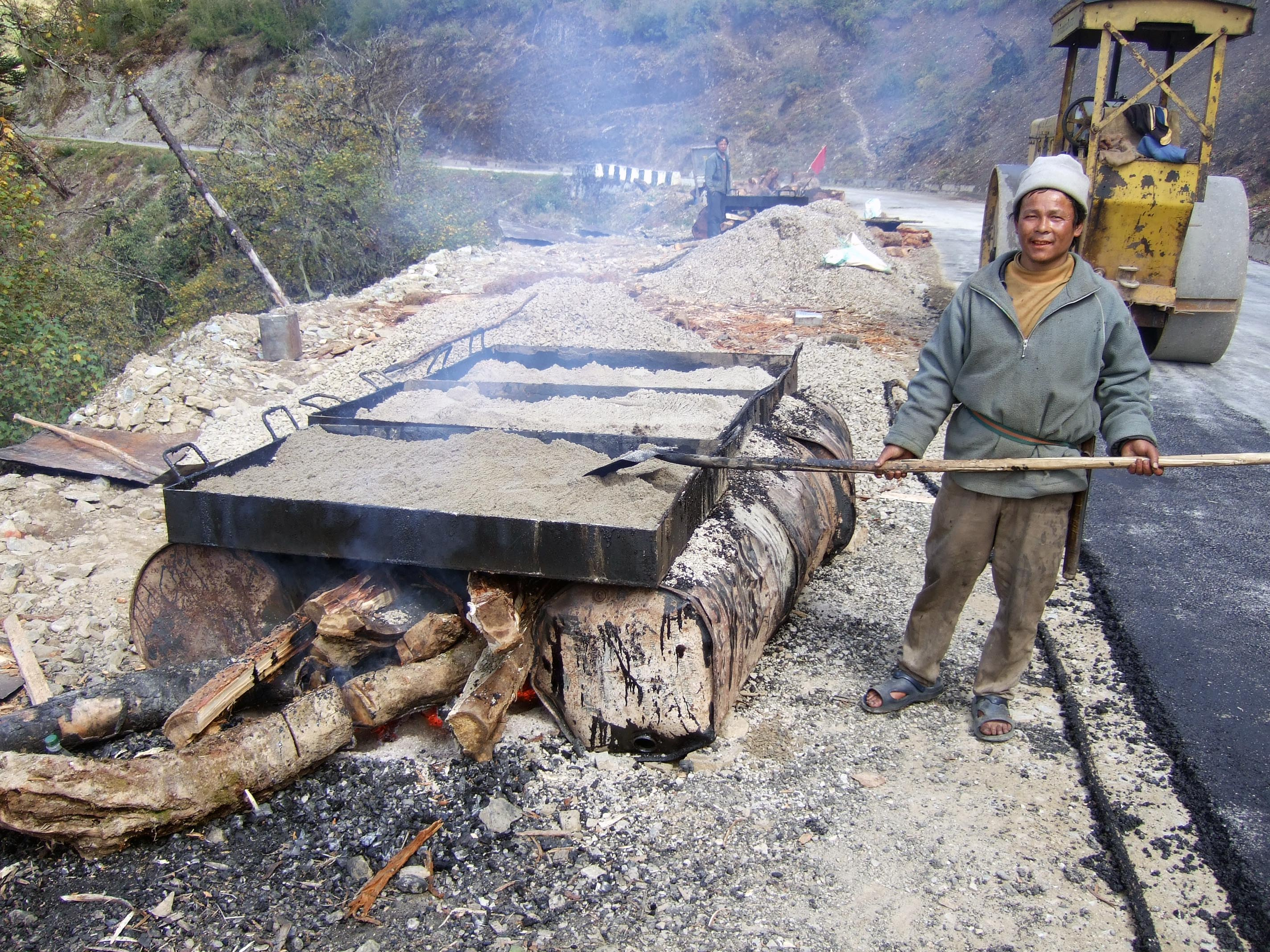
Road construction in Bhutan

Because much of the geology is unstable, there are frequent slips and landslides, which are aggravated by both summer monsoon and winter snowstorm and frost heave conditions. Teams of Indian labourers are housed at work camps in the mountain passes to be dispatched to clear the roads in the event of road blockage. The conditions in the work camps are poor, with the workers reduced to breaking rock into gravel on a piece-rate basis when not clearing the roads. An international aid project is under way to stabilize the worst sections of the road. A major Japanese aid project seeks to replace most of the narrow single track bridges with two-way girder spans capable of carrying heavier traffic. There are no stoplights.

Mountain passes are often closed during winter due to heavy snowfall, shutting off land communication along the Lateral Road. During road closures, commercial and public vehicles are prohibited from attempting passes such as Thrumshing La, however private vehicles may proceed at their own risk. Blockages at high altitudes must be cleared by both heavy equipment and manual labour. At times, clearing crews have considerable difficulty even reaching the pass.

Along the Lateral Road, there are many sheer drops of thousands of feet at the roadside, notably around Thrumshing La. Because of the many hazards and frequently dangerous conditions, the Government of Bhutan has approved and begun constructing a bypass to the Lateral Road around Thrumshing La as part of its Tenth Five Year Plan. The bypass will cut travel time, distance, and danger by avoiding Thrumshing La. The new route is expected to shorten travel time between Shingkhar village (Ura Gewog, Bumthang) and Gorgan (Menbi Gewog, Lhuntse) by 100 km and 3 hours. The new road construction was met with fierce opposition by environmentalists; but the government chose to proceed with construction nonetheless.

== See also ==
- Transport in Bhutan
