= Singye Dzong =

Sacred Site of Guru Rinpoche in Bhutan

- Location in Bhutan
- Coordinates: 27°55′N 91°21′E
- Country: Bhutan
- District: Lhuentse District
- Time zone: UTC+6 (BTT)

Singye Dzong is a Buddhist sacred site in Khoma Gewog, Lhuentse Dzongkhag, Bhutan, at an elevation of more than 4,482 meters above sea level. Its name, meaning “Lion Fortress,” refers to a rock formation said to resemble a lion. The site is associated with the activities of Guru Rinpoche and was discovered by Yeshe Tsogyal.
