= Tomenko =

Tomenko (Ukrainian: Томенко) is a Ukrainian surname. Notable people with the surname include:

- Mykola Tomenko (born 1964), Ukrainian politician
- Mykola Tomenko (poet) (1937-2017), Ukrainian poet, writer, and journalist
- Taras Tomenko (born 1976), Ukrainian film director
- Viktor Tomenko (born 1971), Russian politician

== See also ==
- Fomenko
