= Minjay Gewog =

Minjay Gewog སྨིན་རྒྱས་
- Gewog
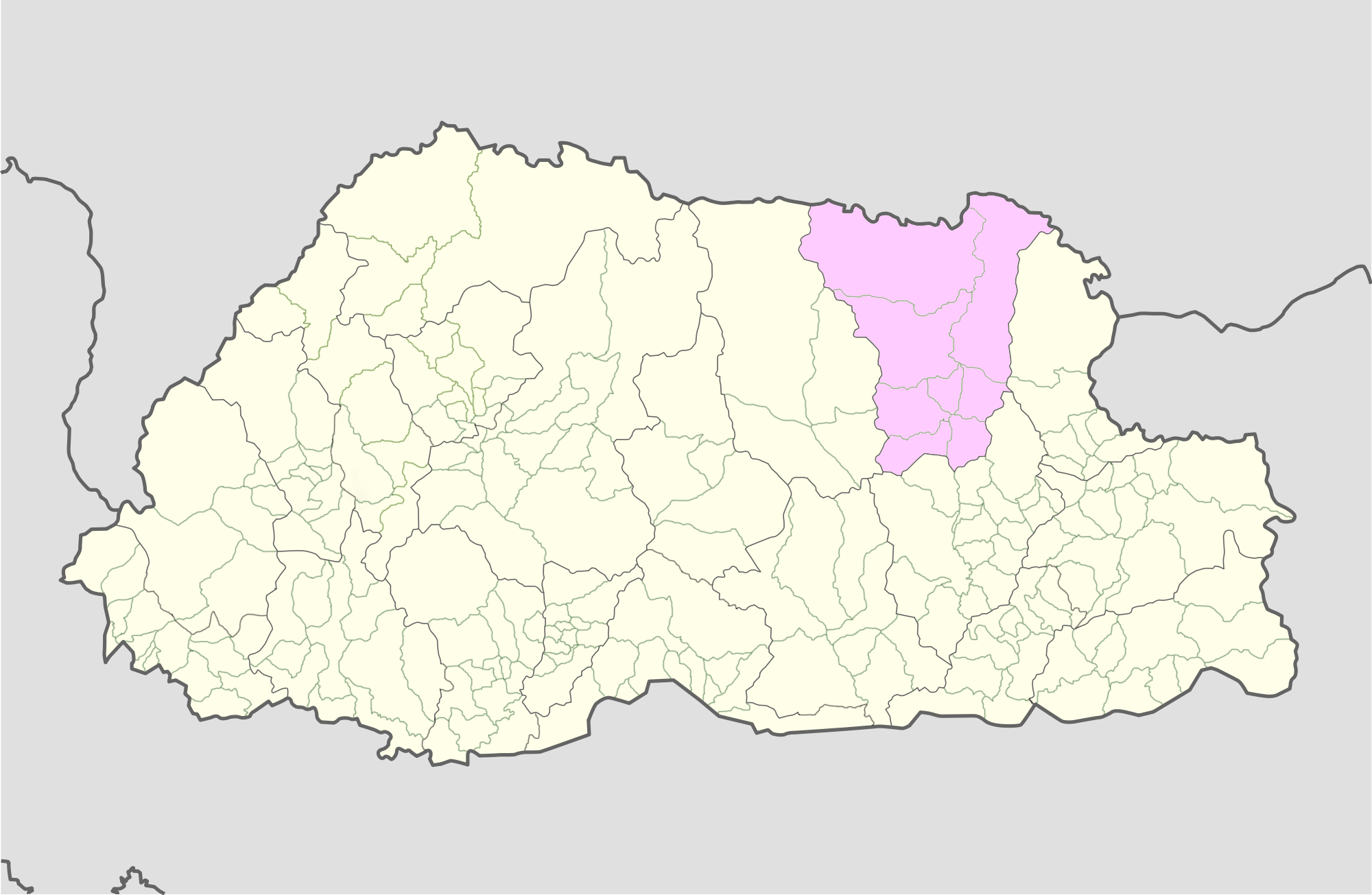
- Country: Bhutan
- District: Lhuntse District
- Time zone: UTC+6 (BTT)

Minjay Gewog (Dzongkha: སྨིན་རྒྱས་) is a gewog (village block) of Lhuntse District, Bhutan.
