= Khenpa Dzong =

- Location in Bhutan
- Coordinates: 27°49′N 91°5′E
- Country: Bhutan
- District: Lhuntse District
- Time zone: UTC+6 (BTT)

Khenpa Dzong is a town in Lhuntse District in northeastern Bhutan.
