= Khomenko =

Khomenko (Cyrillic: Хоменко) a Ukrainian language surname derived from the given name Khoma, or Thomas.

Notable people with this surname include:

- Ilya Khomenko (born 1995), Russian swimmer
- Oleh Khomenko (born 1972), Ukrainian serviceman
- Oleksiy Khomenko (born 1994), Ukrainian footballer
- Olena Khomenko (born 1975), Ukrainian politician
- Sergei Khomenko (born 1966), Belarusian politician
- Vasily Khomenko (1899–1943), Soviet army commander
- Volodymyr Khomenko (born 1954), Ukrainian politician
