= Khoma (given name) =

Khoma (Ukrainian: Хома) is Ukrainian given name, an equivalent of Thomas. Russian variant: Foma. The surname Khomenko is derived from the name. Notable people and fictional characters with the given name include:

- Fictional character in novella "Viy" By Nikolai Gogol
- Fictional character in film Earth
- Khoma Kozhyn, Ukrainian revolutionary

== See also ==
- Khoma (surname)
- Homa (disambiguation)
