= Oleg Khoma =

Ukrainian translator and historian

- Born: October 30, 1966 (age 59); Vinnytsia
- Other name: Хома Олег Ігорович
- Awards: awarded the Programme for Support for publishing "Scovoroda", carried out by the French Embassy and the French Institute in Ukraine

Education
- Education: Kyiv National Taras Shevchenko University

Philosophical work
- Region: Ukraine
- Institutions: Vinnytsia National Technical University, Kyiv National Taras Shevchenko University
- Main interests: scholastic philosophy, philosophy of the 17th- and 20th centuries, contemporary French philosophy, untranslatability of philosophical terms, Ukrainian philosophical terminology.

Oleg Khoma (born October 30, 1966) is a Ukrainian translator and historian of European philosophy. His research focus is on 17th- and 20th-century French philosophy, particularly Blaise Pascal, René Descartes and Nicolas Malebranche.

== Biography ==
Born in Vinnytsia, Ukraine, Khoma graduated with honors from the Faculty of Philosophy at the Kyiv National Taras Shevchenko University in 1990, and defended his PhD thesis at the same university in 1993, under the supervision of Professor Hanna Horak. Since 1990, he has taught Philosophy at the Vinnytsia National Technical University. He defended his habilitation thesis (1999) at the Institute of Philosophy of the National Academy of Sciences of Ukraine, under the supervision of Professor Oleg Bilyi.

In 2000, Khoma founded Sententiae, the first Ukrainian academic journal specialising in the history of philosophy, of which he remains the editor-in-chief. In 2015, Sententiae became the first Ukrainian philosophical journal indexed by SCOPUS.

Khoma is also a member of the editorial boards of the scientific journals Filosofska dumka (Philosophical thought), and Visnyk of Vinnitsya Technical Institute.

In 2003 he received the title of Professor, and since 2004 he has been the chair of the Department of Philosophy and Humanities at Vinnytsia National Technical University. Since 2000 he has taught as a visiting professor at other Ukrainian universities, including the National University of Kyiv-Mohyla Academy (2000–2005) and Kyiv National Taras Shevchenko University (since 2006). He is the founder and chairman of the Pascal Society, affiliated with the Ukrainian Philosophical Fund, and director of the Renatus Centre for Studies in History of Philosophy.

Khoma also participates in the Ukrainian branch of the international project European Dictionary of Philosophies: A Vocabulary of Untranslatabilities, and is editor-in-chief of its "Epistemology" section.

Khoma's main areas of academic research are scholasticism, European philosophy of the 17th and 20th centuries, contemporary French philosophy, Philosophical Untranslatabilities, and Ukrainian philosophical terminology.

== Awards and grants ==
In 2001, Khoma was awarded the "Skovoroda" Programme for Support for publishing, carried out by the French Embassy and the French Institute in Ukraine, for the translation and publication of Jean-Jacques Rousseau's treatise The Social Contract, Or Principles of Political Right.

In 2011 he received a special award from the Ukrainian Philosophical Foundation for Promotion of philosophical commentary.

In 2015 he was again awarded the "Skovoroda Prize", for the edition Descartes's "Meditations" in the light of modern interpretations.

In 1998, 2004, and 2009 he received a grant from the Centre national du livre for his translations and studies in France.

== Main publications ==
=== Books ===
- Truth and evidence: sympthomatological thinking in Modern Philosophy (1998, in Rus.) (Book Review in «UHO»)
- Comments and notes on Pascal's "Pensées" (2009, in Ukr., co-authored with E. Chukhray) (Online read on scribd.com) (On the webpage of the Publisher)
- Comments notes and bibliographic materials to S. Pinckaers "Sources of Christian morality" (in S. Pinckaers Sources of Christian morality. – Kyiv, Duh i litera. – 2013. – P. 441–595; in Ukr.; co-authored with E. Chukhray) (On the web page of Publisher)
- (ed.) Descartes's "Meditations" in the light of modern interpretations: Jean-Marie Beyssade, Jean-Luc Marion, Kim Sang Ong-Van-Cung (2014, in Ukr.)

=== Articles ===
- Living God and theodicy (1995, in Ukr.)
- The problem of evidence in Cartesianism (1996, in Ukr.)
- Nietzsche and Schizoanalysis (1997, in Ukr.)
- Pascal about justice : power, machinery, structures (Duh i litera. – 1997. - № 1-2, P. 282-291; in Rus.)
- Myths about Pascal: the Problem of the Directions’ Variety in XVII century Philosophy (1997, in Rus.)
- J.-J. Rousseau's Treatise on the Social Contract (1999, in Ukr.)
- Pascal's Texts: the type of the narrative instance, the status of Truth, the topic of nuance (2000, in Ukr.)
- François Poullain de la Barre and Modern Philosophy (2001, in Ukr.)
- Modern heritage of the contemporary tolerance (2002, in Ukr.)
- Alain Touraine and the resuscitation of philosophy (2003, in Ukr.)
- Justification of the new French translation of Cartesian «Meditationes»: Ukrainian parallels (2005, in Ukr.)
- Leibniz’ Terminology as a living Mirror of Ukrainian philosophical terminology (2008, in Ukr.)
- Cartesian topics in the work of Pascal: Modern Pascal's Studies and stereotypes (2008, in Ukr.)
- Pensées and Hermeneutics : philosophical significance of the new Pascal's apologetics (2009, in Ukr.)
- Philosophical translation and philosophical community (2010, FD, in Ukr.)
- Philosophical cultures: tolerance and Recognition (2011, Voprosy filosofii; in Rus.)
- Anima / animus, animus / mens: accumulation of untranslatability (2010, Sententiae; in Ukr.)
- Ingenium and deductive method of Descartes (2010, Sententiae; in Ukr.)
- The Thomas Aquinas Doctrine on the background of Ukrainian history of philosophy (in Ukr., forew. in A. Baumeister Thomas Aquinas: an introduction to thinking. God, life and learning. – Kyiv. Duh i litera, 2012, P. 9-14; in Ukr.)
- Descartes and Pascal : the way to philosophy on the background of the Grand Siècle (in 2012, in Ukr.)
- Apercevoir, perceptio and perception: Descartes and the problem of self-translation (2012, Sententiae; in Ukr.)

=== Translations and commentaries ===
- Pascal B. Works, in 3 vols. (Kyiv, 1994–1997, in Rus.)
- Foucault M. The history of sexuality III: The Care of the Self (Kiev, Moscow, 1998, in Rus., in coop. with T. Titova)
- Rousseau J.-J. The Social Contract, or Principles of Political Right (Kyiv, 2001, in Ukr.)
- Malebranche N. The Search after Truth, vols. 1-2 (Kyiv, 2001, in Ukr.)
- Balandier G. Political Anthropology (Kyiv, 2002, in Ukr., in coop. with O. Goudjin)
- Revel J.-F. Democracy Against Itself (Kyiv, 2003, in Ukr., in coop. with Z. Borisyuk)
- Deleuze G. Nietzsche and Philosophy (Moscow, 2004, in Rus. )
- Condorcet About Elections (Lviv, 2004, in Ukr.)
- Poullain de la Barre F. On the Equality of the two Sexes (Kyiv, 2006, in Ukr.)
- Leibniz G.W. Principles of Nature and Grace ... (Kyiv, 2008, in Ukr., Ed.)
- Pascal B. Pensées (Kyiv, 2009, in Ukr., in coop. with A. Perepadia)
- Pinckaers S. Sources of Christian Ethics (Kyiv, 2013, in Ukr., Ed.)
- Leibniz G.W. Monadology (Vinnitsa, 2013, in Ukr., Ed.)
- Descartes R. Meditations on First Philosophy / Metaphysical Meditation (Kyiv, 2014, in Ukr., in coop. with A. Baumeister)
