= Olena Khomenko =

Ukrainian politician (born 1975)

- Олена Хоменко
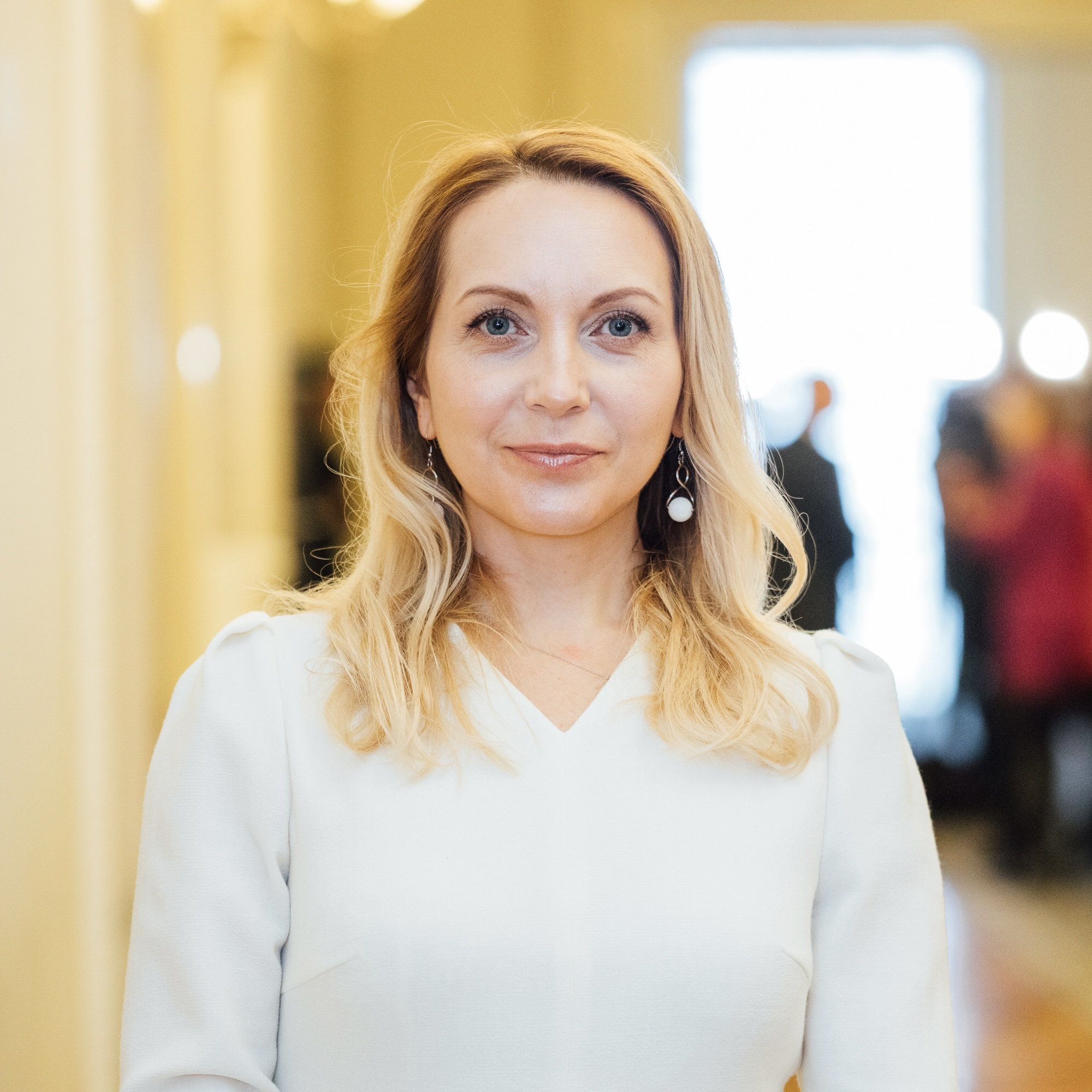
- Khomenko in October 2023

Member of the Verkhovna Rada
- Incumbent
- Assumed office 29 August 2019

Personal details
- Born: Olena Viktorivna Khomenko; 7 December 1975 (age 50) Bishkek, Soviet Union
- Party: Servant of the People

Olena Viktorivna Khomenko (Ukrainian: Олена Вікторівна Хоменко; born on 7 December 1975), is a Kyrgyz-born Ukrainian politician who is currently serving as a member of the Verkhovna Rada since 29 August 2019.

She is also the vice president of the Parliamentary Assembly of the Council of Europe since 23 January 2023.

== Biography ==
Olena Khomenko was born in Bishkek, Kyrgyzstan, on 7 December 1975.

She graduated from the Faculty of Economics of the Kyiv National University of Economics named after Vadym Hetman (specialty "Marketing Management"). She received a diploma in marketing from the Chartered Institute of Marketing (Chartered Institute of Marketing, UK).

She received her master's degree in "International Law" at the Educational and Scientific Institute of International Relations of Taras Shevchenko KNU. He is currently studying at the Kyiv-Mohyla Business School under the "Strategic Leadership in the Security and Defense Sector" program.

Khomenko was the director of management and development of digital products at Kvartal 95 LLC. She worked in management positions in leading telecom and IT companies.

She is a volunteer at the NGO "League of Volunteers".

Khomenko was a candidate for People's Deputies from the Servant of the People party in the 2019 parliamentary elections, No. 129 on the list. At the time of the elections, she was the director of management and development of digital products of "Kvartal 95" LLC, member of the "Servant of the People" party, and lives in Kyiv.

She had been a member of the Verkhovna Rada Committee on National Security, Defense and Intelligence.

On 19 May 2021, she had been a member of the temporary investigative commission of the VRU on the investigation of possible illegal actions of representatives of state authorities and other persons that could contribute to the violation of state sovereignty, territorial integrity and inviolability of Ukraine and pose a threat to the national security of Ukraine.

On 22 January 2023, Khomenko became the PACE Vice-president and Deputy Member of the Permanent Delegation to the Parliamentary Assembly of the Council of Europe.
