= Vinnytsia National Technical University =

Public university in Vinnytsia, Ukraine

- Вінницький національний технічний університет
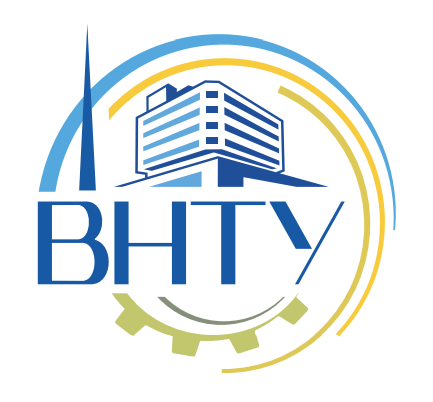
- Type: Public
- Established: 1960
- Affiliations: Ministry of Education and Science of Ukraine
- Academic affiliations: European Universities Association; IFIA; International Academy of Sciences of higher education institutions; IAU; SPIE; АСМ
- Rector: Viktor Bilichenko
- Students: ~5,000
- Location: Khmelnytske Shosse St, 95, Vinnytsia, Vinnytsia Oblast, 21021, Ukraine
- Campus: Urban
- Website: Official website
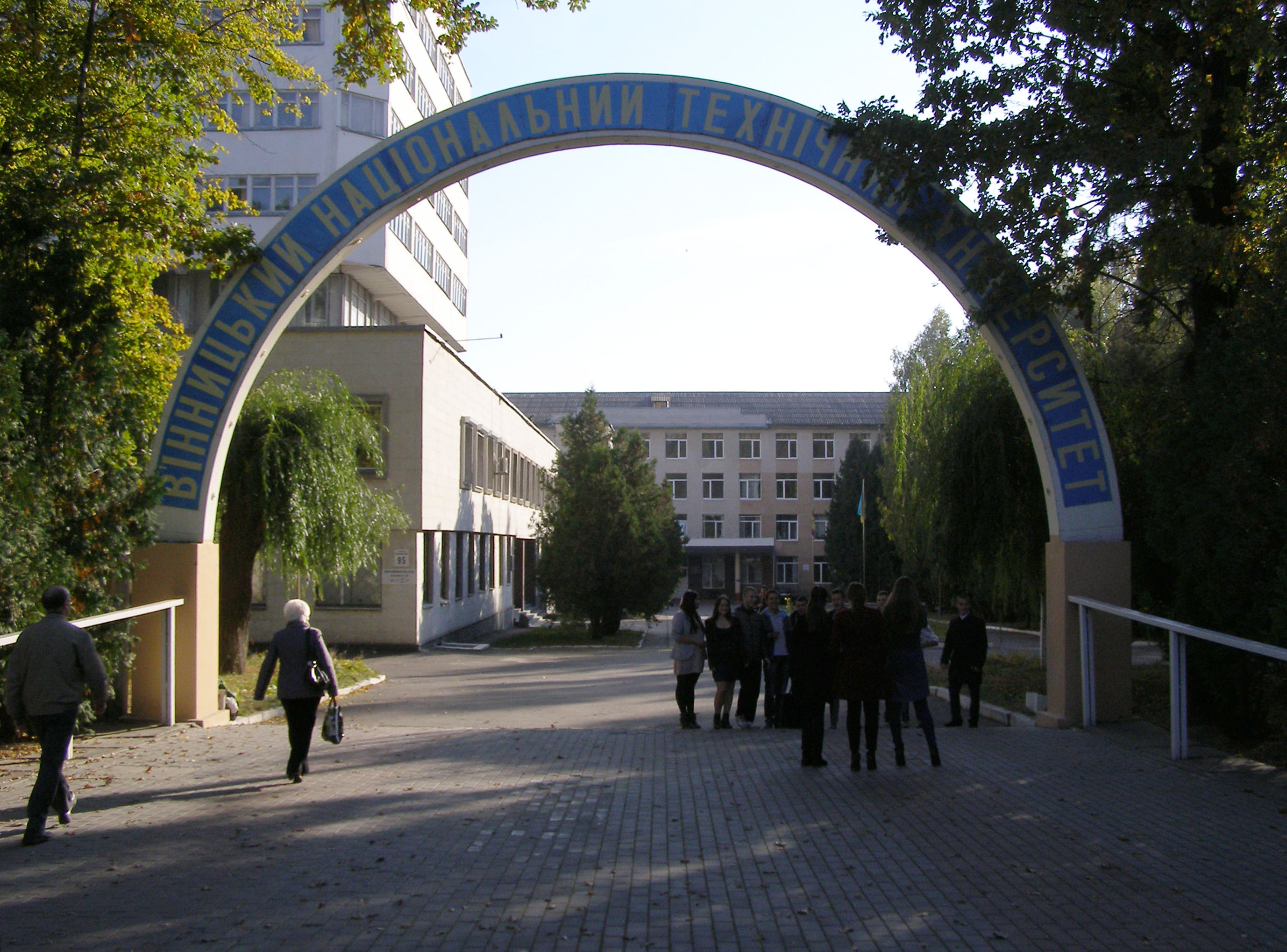

The Vinnytsia National Technical University (Ukrainian: Вінницький національний технічний університет), or VNTU, is a higher education state-sponsored university in Vinnytsia, Ukraine. It has the fourth level of accreditation in the Ukrainian education system and ranks among the five top technical universities within the country.

== Rectors ==
- 1960 to 1976 – Roman Kigel, Honored Worker of Public Education of Ukraine, Candidate of Economic Sciences, Professor. He founded an educational institution, opened the first eleven specialties, created the first third of the material base.
- 1976 to 1989 – Ivan Kuzmin, Doctor of Technical Sciences, Professor, Honored Scientist of Ukraine, Laureate of the State Prize of Ukraine, Academician and Vice President of the International Academy of Applied Radio Electronics, President of the Vinnytsia Small Academy of Sciences, Fellow of the President of Ukraine. As an expert in cybernetics, he made Vinnytsia Polytechnic Institute one of the leading higher educational institutions of Ukraine, opened 5 more specialties and created the second third of the material base.
- 1989 to 2010 – Borys Mokin, Doctor of Technical Sciences, Professor, Honored Worker of Science and Technology of Ukraine, Academician of the National Academy of Educational Sciences of Ukraine, People's Deputy of the Verkhovna Rada of the Ukrainian SSR in the 12th convocation, People's Deputy of the Verkhovna Rada of Ukraine in the 1st convocation, Prime Minister of Ukraine in 2009–2010, member of the National Union of Journalists of Ukraine, Senior Member of the Institute of Electrical and Electronics Engineers. He opened fifteen more specialties, constantly updated the old and created new material base.
- 2010 to 2020 – Volodymyr Grabko, Doctor of Technical Sciences, Professor, Academician of the Transport Academy of Sciences of Ukraine, Honored Worker of Education of Ukraine, Honored Worker of Science and Technology of Ukraine.
- Since 2021 – Viktor Bilichenko, Doctor of Technical Sciences, Professor, Honored Worker of Science and Technology of Ukraine, Academician of the Transport Academy of Ukraine.

== University structure ==
=== Faculties and educational and scientific institutes ===
VNTU consists of seven faculties and one educational and scientific institute:

- Faculty of Computer Systems and Automation (ФКСА)
  - Department of Computer Control Systems (КСУ)
  - Department of Automation and Information and Measurement Technology (АІВТ)
  - Department of Integration of Training with Production (ІНВ)
  - Department of Laser and Optoelectronic Engineering (ЛОТ)
  - Department of Metrology and Industrial Automation (МПА)
  - Department of Systems Analysis, Computer Monitoring and Engineering Graphics (САКМІГ)
- Faculty of Construction, Thermal Engineering and Gas Supply (ФБТЕГП)
  - Department of Construction, Municipal Economy and Architecture (БМГА)
  - Department of Engineering Systems in Construction (ІСБ)
  - Department of Thermal Engineering (ТЕ)
  - Department of Foreign Languages (ІМ)
- Faculty of Power Engineering and Electromechanics (ФЕЕЕМ)
  - Department of Power Plants and Systems (ЕСС)
  - Department of Theoretical Electrical Engineering and Electrical Measurements (ТЕЕВ)
  - Department of Philosophy and Humanities (ФГН)
  - Department of Electromechanical Automation Systems in Industry and Transport (ЕМСАПТ)
  - Department of Electrical Systems of Power Consumption and Energy Management (ЕСЕЕМ)
  - Department of Renewable Energy and Transport Systems and Complexes (ВЕТЕСК)
- Faculty of Information Technology and Computer Engineering (ФІТКІ)
  - Department of Information Security (ЗІ)
  - Department of Computer Science (КН)
  - Department of Software (ПЗ)
  - Department of Advanced Mathematics (ВМ)
- Faculty of Mechanical Engineering and Transport (ФМТ)
  - Department of Machine-building Technology and Automation
  - Department of Industrial Engineering (ГМ)
  - Department of Automobiles and Transport Management (АТМ)
  - Department of Technology for Increasing Resilience (ТПЗ)
  - Department of Materials Resistance and Applied Mechanics (ОМПМ)
  - Department of Life Safety and Safety Pedagogy (БЖДПБ)
- Faculty of Infocommunications, Radio Engineering and Nanosystems (ФІРЕН)
  - Department of Radio Engineering (РТ)
  - Department of Telecommunication Systems and Television (ТКСТБ)
  - Department of Linguistics (МВ)
  - Department of Biomedical Engineering (БМІ)
  - Department of Electronics and Nanosystems (ЕНС)
- Faculty of Management and Information Security (ФМІБ)
  - Department of Management, Marketing and Economics (ММЕ)
  - Department of Finance and Innovation Management (ФІМ)
  - Department of Business Economics and Production Management (ЕПВМ)
  - Department of Management and Security of Information Systems (МБІС)
  - Department of Entrepreneurship and Financial Activity (ПФД)
  - Department of Social and Political Sciences (СПН)
- Institute for Environmental Safety and Environmental Monitoring (ІнЕБМД)
  - Department of Ecology and Environmental Safety (ЕЕБ)
  - Department of Chemistry and Chemical Technology (ХХТ)
  - Department of Physical Education (ФВ)
  - Department of General Physics (ЗФ)

=== Integral institutes ===
VNTU also includes seven integral institutes designed to support the educational process:

- Institute of Master's, Aspirant and Doctoral Studies (ІнМАД)
- Institute of Humanitarian and Pedagogical Problems and Education (ІнГППВ)
- Institute for Integration of Training with Production (ІнІНВ)
- Institute of International Relations (ІнМЗ)
- Institute of Pre-University Training (ІнДП)
- Institute for Organizational and Methodological Support of Education (ІнОМЗН)
- Institute of Advanced Educational Technologies (ІнПОТ)

=== Scientific and Technical Library (НТБ) ===
The VNTU Scientific and Technical Library includes:

- Department of Acquisition and Scientific Processing of Literature
- Department of Basic Book Storage
- Department of Scientific Information and Bibliography
- Department of Social and Humanitarian Literature
- Department of Educational Literature Service
- Department of Information Technology and Computer Support

== University management ==
Rector: Victor Bilichenko, Professor.

Vice-rectors

- The First Vice Rector on scientific works and international cooperation - Volodymyr Grabko, Prof.;
- Vice Rector on educational and methodic works, the chief of organizational and methodical provision of education – Olexandr Petrov, Docent;
- Vice Rector for perspective development and infrastructure - Viktor Tsyrkun.

== See also ==
List of universities in Ukraine
