= Lhuntse =

- Lhuentse
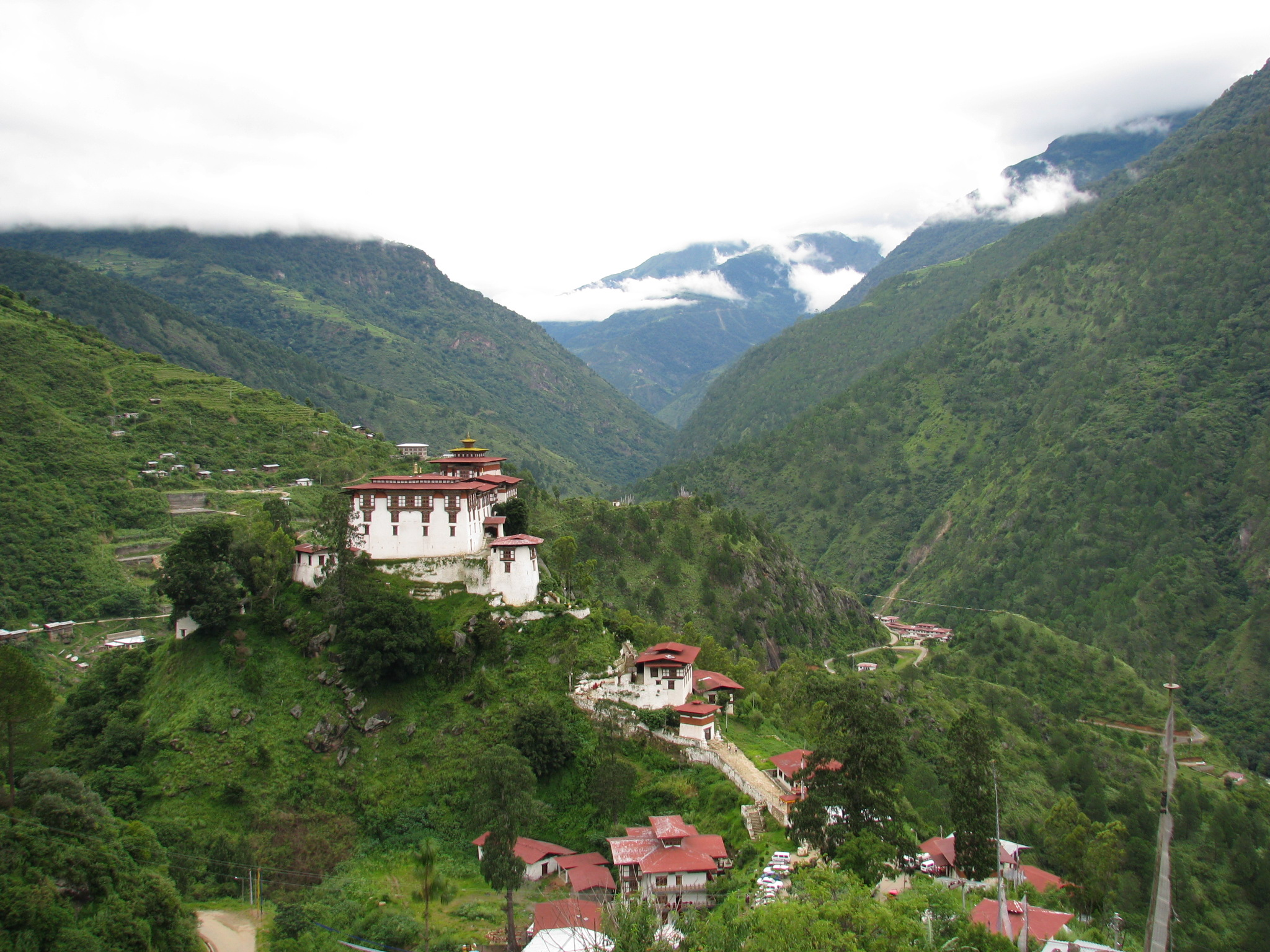

- Location in Bhutan
- Coordinates: 27°39′N 91°9′E
- Country: Bhutan
- District: Lhuentse District
- Village block: Gangzur Gewog
- Time zone: UTC+6 (BTT)
- Climate: Cwb
- Website: Official website

Lhuentse is a town and the headquarters of the eponymous Lhuentse District in northeastern Bhutan. It is about 74 km from Mongar, 145 km from Trashigang and 452 km from the national capital Thimphu. Nearest airport is Yongphulla Airport 130 km away.

== History ==
In 1551, Ngagi Wangchuk, the youngest son of Ngawang Chogyal, visited Bhutan, accompanied by his family from Druk Ralung in Tibet. His visit of a number of holy sites in different regions of the country eventually took him to kurtoe. At the present-day site of Lhentse Dzong he meditated and built a small temple which came to be known as Kurtoe Lhentse Phodrang.

There the local deity appeared before him in the form of white, bleating goat. the bleat was taken as an auspicious sign, and he built a temple in 1552. During the reign of the fourth Desi gyalse Tenzin Rabgay, a monk-tax - a tradition of sending one boy from each family to the Dzongs - was imposed, whereby the first sixty monks were recruited in Lhentse Dratshang. After the completion of the Dzong, various religious artifacts and relics were installed by the 4th Desi Gyalse Tenzin Rabgye.

== Development plans ==
It is also the site of proposed joint "India-Bhutan Lhuntse Advanced Landing Ground" (AGL) capable of handling large transport aircraft and fighter jets.

== Tourism ==
It is the location of the Lhuentse Dzong, Bumdeling Wildlife Sanctuary in Trashiyangtse district is just to the northeast, and Tawang in India lies to the east.

== Administration ==
The postal code for Lhuentse is 45001.

== See also ==
- Bhutan–India relations
- Bhutan–India border
- Bhutan–China border
- Line of Actual Control
