= Foma (given name) =

Foma (Russian: Фома) is a Russian male given name, variant of Thomas. Notable people:

- Foma Kozhyn, Ukrainian revolutionary

== Fictional characters ==
- Foma, the narrator of Nikolai Gogol's short story "A Bewitched Place"
- Foma Gordeyev
- Foma Kiniaev, an alias used by Jason Bourne

== See also ==
- Khoma (surname)
