= Metsho Gewog =

Metsho Gewog སྨད་མཚོ་
- Gewogs
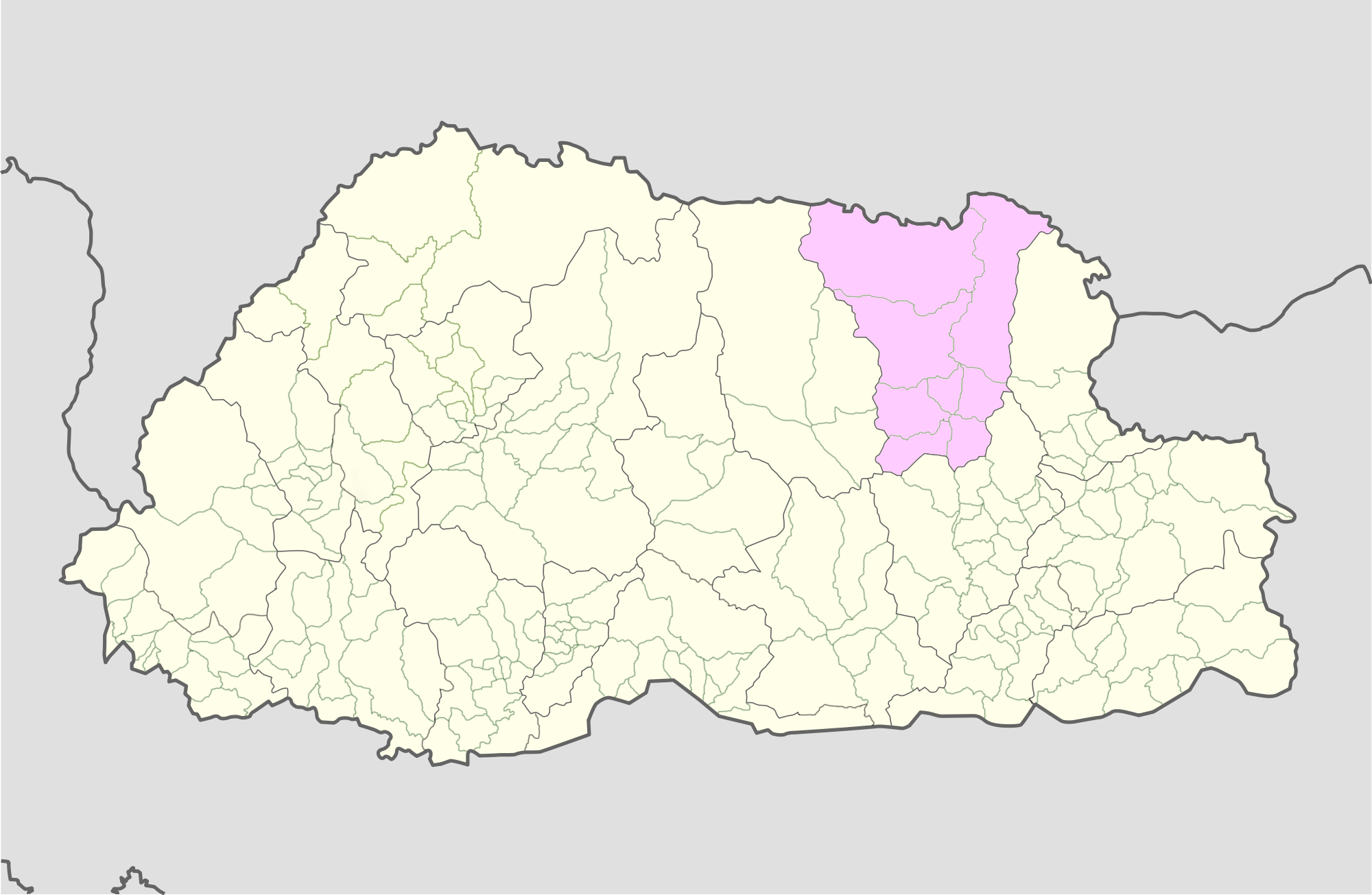
- Country: Bhutan
- District: Lhuntse District
- Time zone: UTC+6 (BTT)

Metsho Gewog (Dzongkha: སྨད་མཚོ་) is a gewog (village block) of Lhuntse District, Bhutan.
