= Jaray Gewog =

Jarey Gewog རྒྱ་རས་
- Gewogs
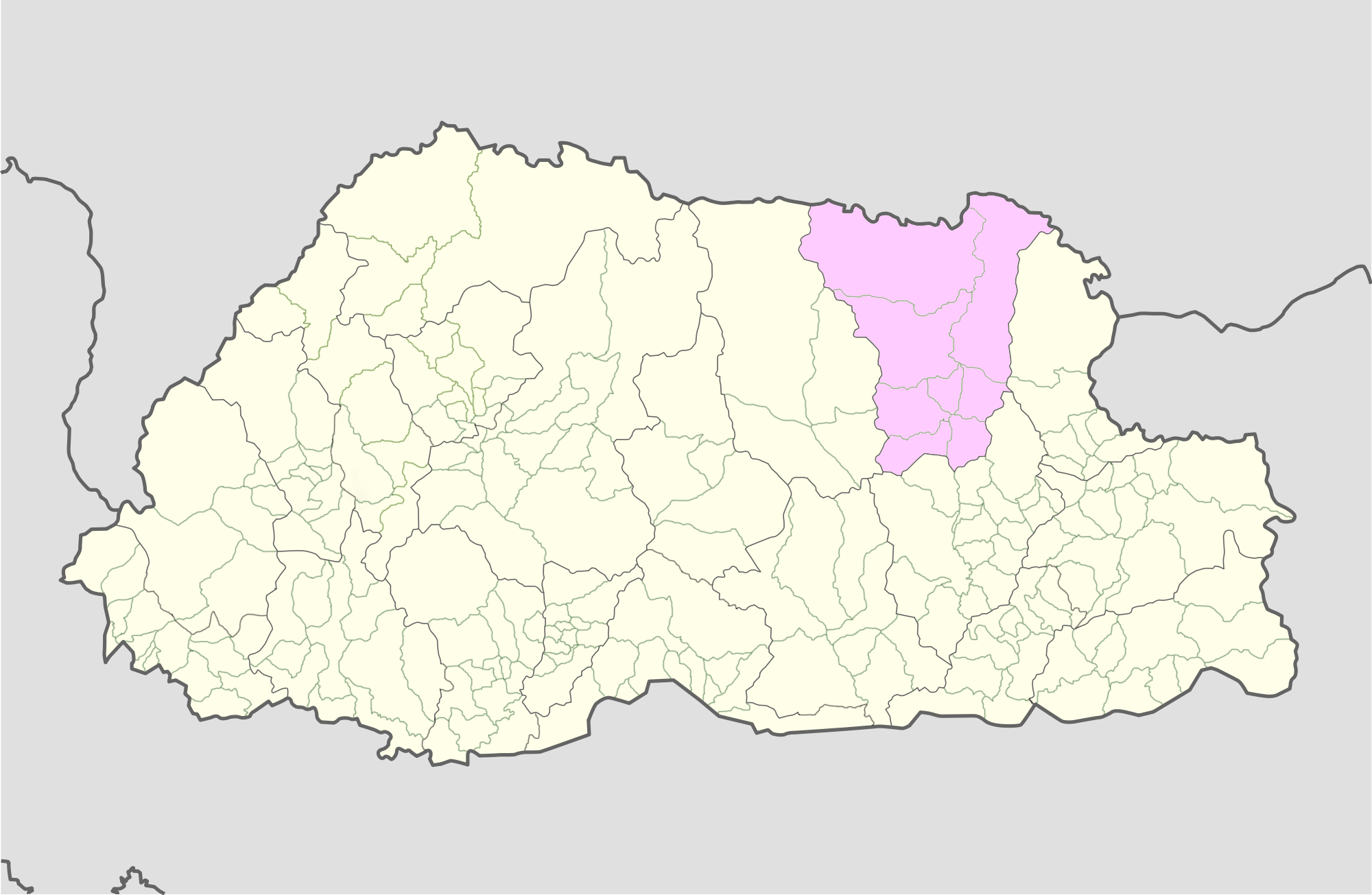
- Country: Bhutan
- District: Lhuntse District
- Time zone: UTC+6 (BTT)

Jarey Gewog (Dzongkha: རྒྱ་རས་) is a gewog (village block) of Lhuntse District, Bhutan.
