= Khoma (surname) =

Khoma (Ukrainian: Khoma, sometimes Choma) is a Ukrainian surname.

- Andriy Khoma, Ukrainian professional footballer
- Bohdan Khoma, Ukrainian footballer
- Ivan Choma, Ukrainian Greek Catholic hierarch and ecclesiastical historian
- Mykhailo Khoma, Ukrainian singer
- Natalia Khoma, Ukrainian-born cellist
- Oleg Khoma, Ukrainian translator and historian of European philosophy
- Volodymyr Khoma, Ukrainian educator, local historian, literary critic, folklorist
- Yaroslav Khoma, Ukrainian footballer

== See also ==
- Khoma (given name)
