= Khoma, Bhutan =

Settlement in Lhuntse District, Bhutan

Coordinates: 27.44°N 91.17°E

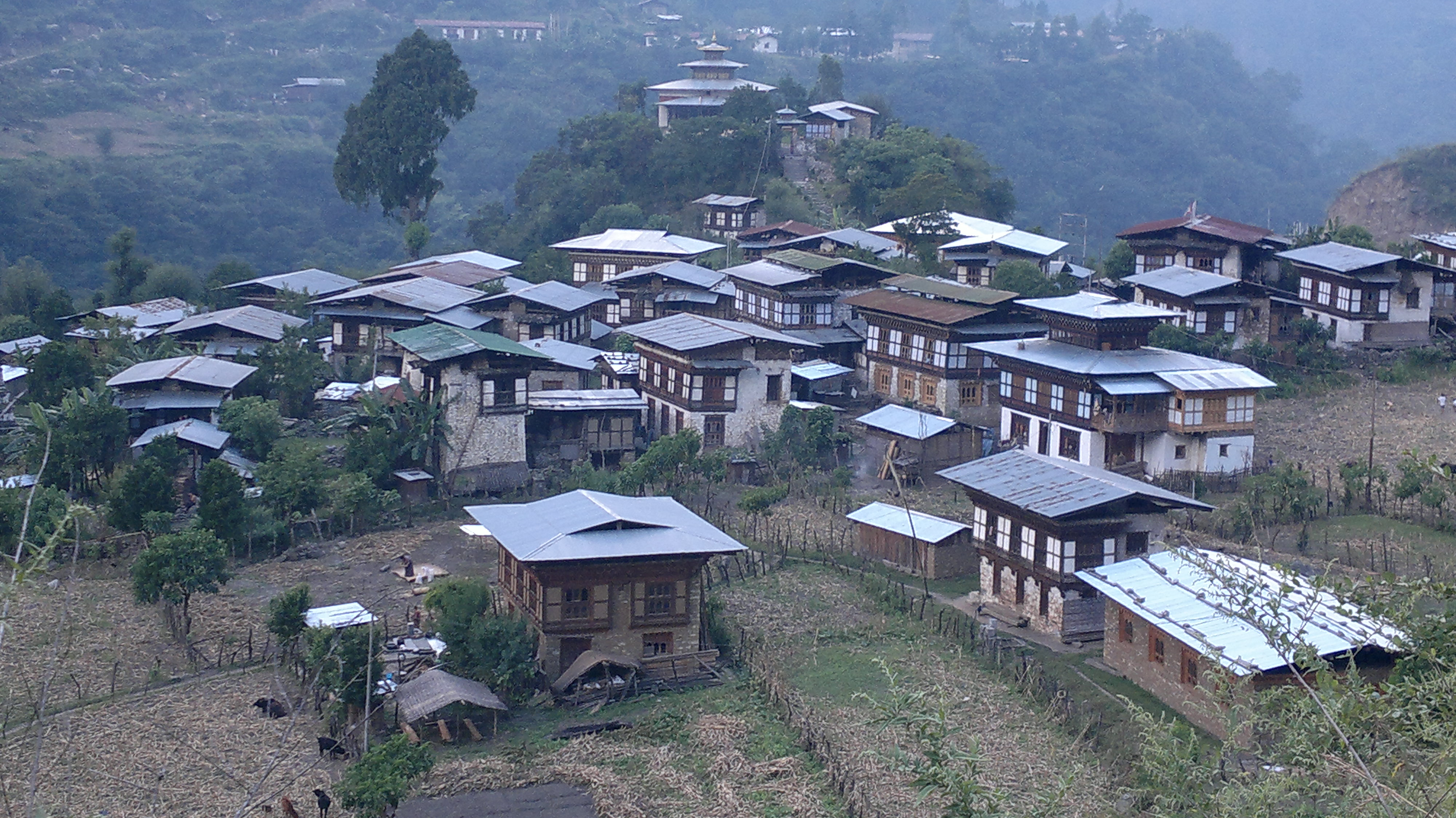
View of Khoma village, Lhuntse District

Khoma is a settlement in the north of Bhutan. It is located in Lhuntse District.
