= Khoma Gewog =

Coordinates: 27.7000°N 91.2500°E

Khoma Gewog མཁོལ་མ་ Khoema
- Gewogs
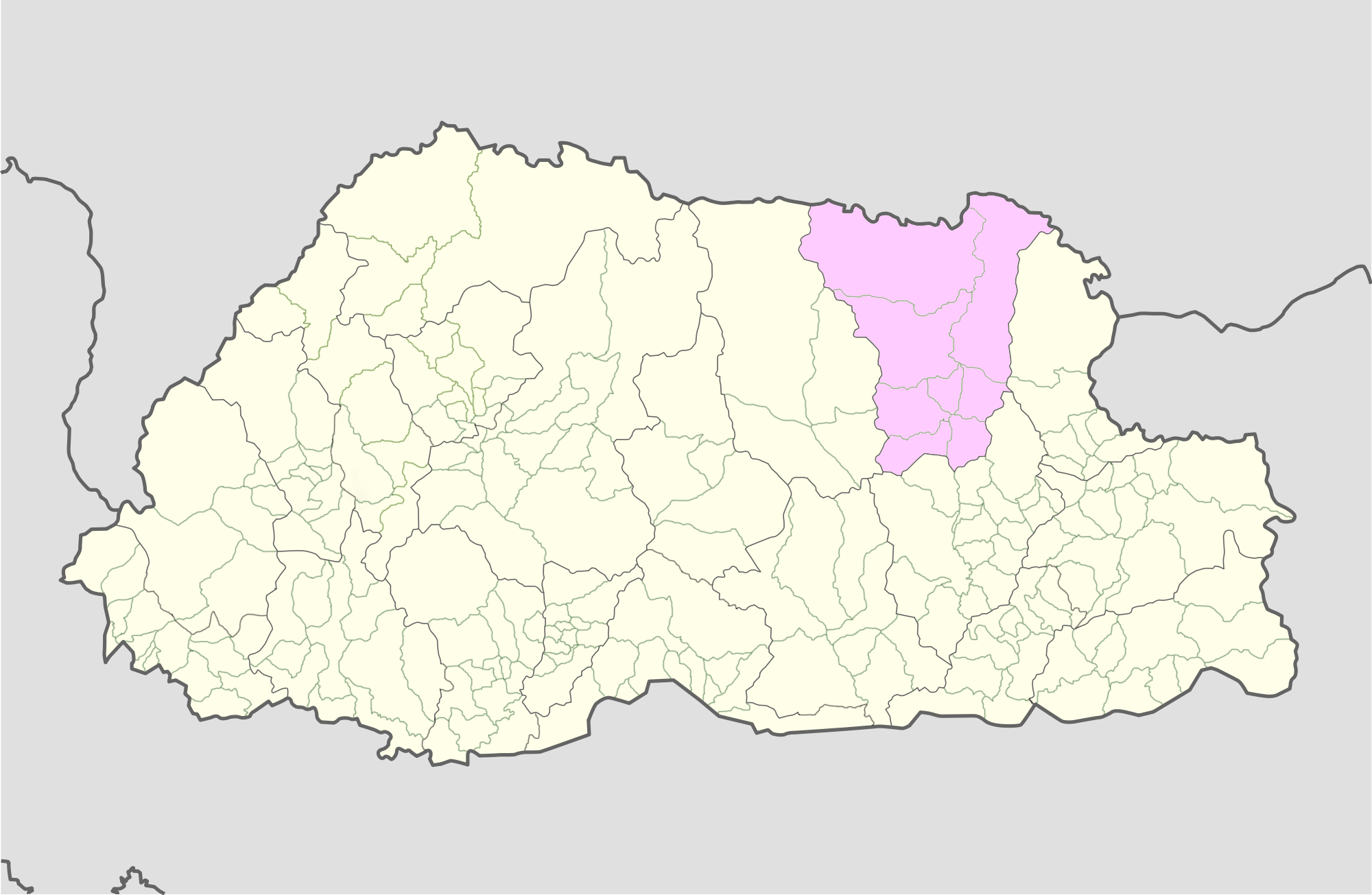
- Country: Bhutan
- District: Lhuntse District
- Time zone: UTC+6 (BTT)

Khoma Gewog (Dzongkha: མཁོ་མ་) is a gewog (village block) of Lhuntse District, Bhutan.
