= Tsenkhar Gewog =

Tsenkhar Gewog སཙན་མཁར་
- Gewogs
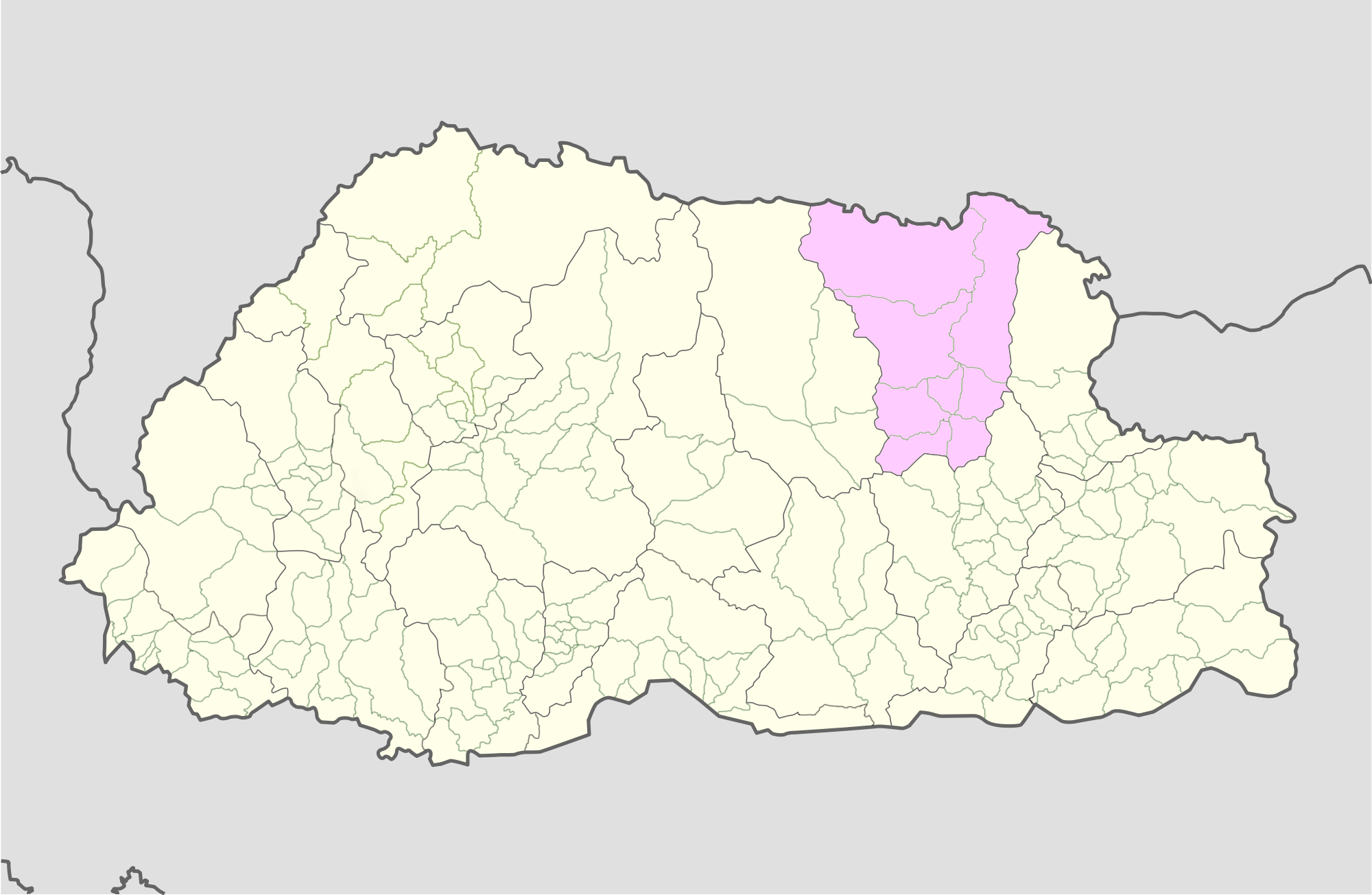
- Country: Bhutan
- District: Lhuntse District
- Time zone: UTC+6 (BTT)

Tsenkhar Gewog (Dzongkha: སཙན་མཁར་) is a gewog (village block) in Lhuntse District, Bhutan.
