= Olga Foma =

Moldovan footballer

Personal information
- Date of birth: 1 January 1989 (age 37)
- Position: Defender

Senior career*
| Years | Team | Apps | (Gls) |
- Narta
- Roma Calfa
- Goliador Chișinău

International career
| 2005 | Moldova U19 | 1 | (?) |
| 2006 | Moldova | 2 | (0) |
- * Club domestic league appearances and goals

Olga Foma (born 1 January 1989) is a Moldovan former footballer who played as a defender. She has been a member of the Moldova women's national team.

== International career ==
Foma capped for Moldova at senior level during the 2007 FIFA Women's World Cup qualification (UEFA second category), including a 0–1 home loss to Israel on 11 May 2006.
