= Gangzur Gewog =

Gangzur Gewog སྒང་ཟུར་
- Gewogs
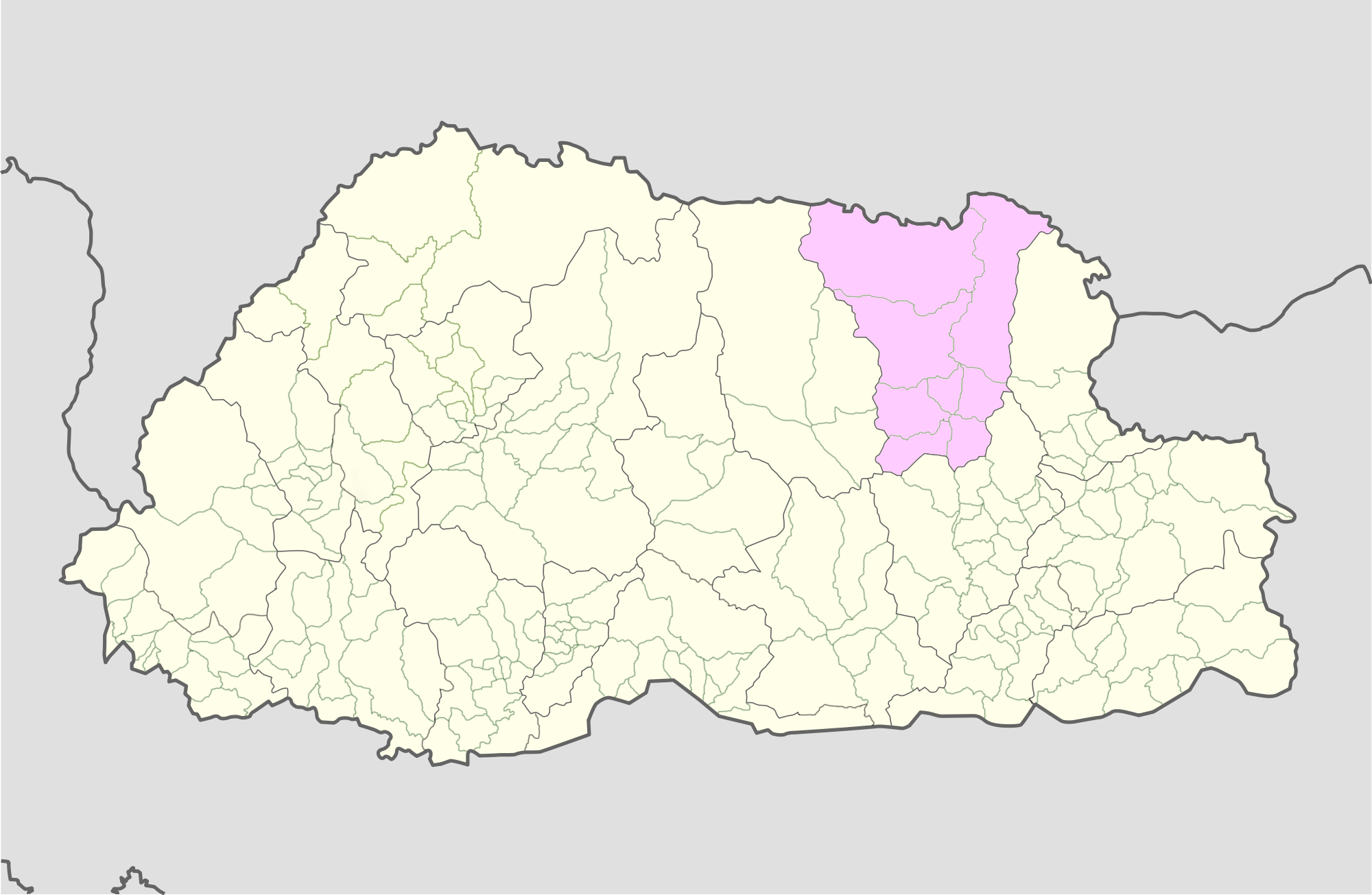
- Country: Bhutan
- District: Lhuntse District
- Time zone: UTC+6 (BTT)

Gangzur Gewog (Dzongkha: སྒང་ཟུར་) is a gewog (village block) of Lhuntse District, Bhutan. Gangzur gewog covers an area of 356 sqkm and has a population of 5059 with 471 households, which includes gungtongs (empty houses). These households have been left empty mainly due to development programs.

There are many gungtongs around the country and its still the same because all the teenagers are attracted to the modern development and mainly due to the rural-urban migration. Gangzur gewog is mostly profound for their rich culture in creating clay pot (dza-zo). This tradition art form, shrouded in the midst of time, is asource of pride for the people of gangzur gewog.
