= Menbi Gewog =

Coordinates: 27.5994°N 91.1814°E

Menbi Gewog སྨན་སྦིས་
- Gewog
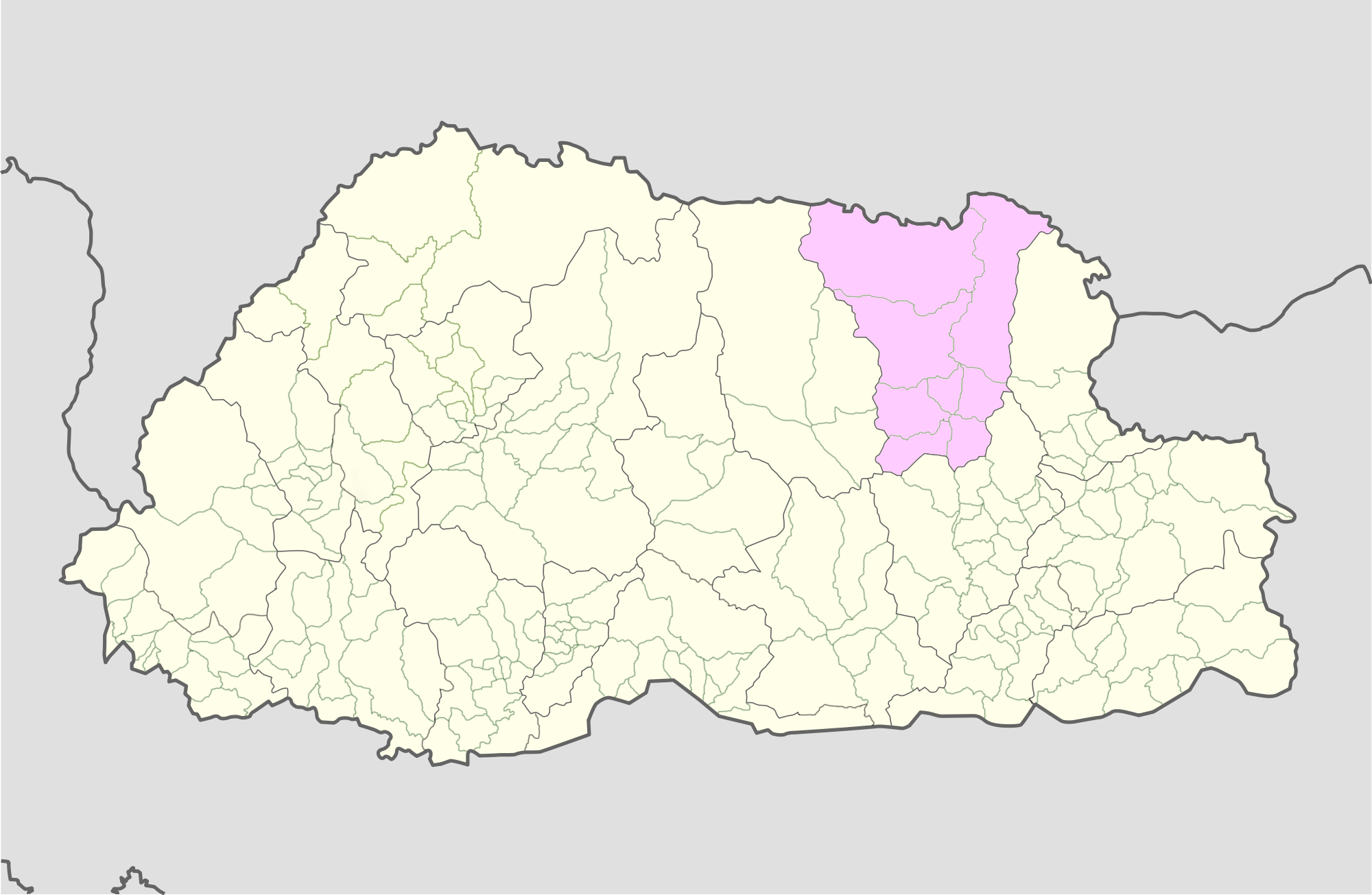
- Country: Bhutan
- District: Lhuntse District
- Time zone: UTC+6 (BTT)

Menbi Gewog (Dzongkha: སྨན་སྦིས་) is one of eight gewogs (village block) of Lhuntse District, Bhutan located overlooking the fertile Tagmochhu valley.
