= Lhuntse District =

District of Bhutan

Coordinates: 27°40′N 91°0′E

Lhuntse District ལྷུན་རྩེ་རྫོང་ཁག།
- District
- Location of Lhuntse district in Bhutan
- Country: Bhutan
- Headquarters: Lhuntse

Area
  - Total: 1,944 km^{2} (751 sq mi)

Population (2017)
  - Total: 14,437
  - Density: 7.426/km^{2} (19.23/sq mi)
- Time zone: UTC+6 (BTT)
- HDI (2019): 0.605 medium · 14th of 20
- Website: lhuentse.gov.bt

Lhuentse District (Dzongkha: ལྷུན་རྩེ་རྫོང་ཁག།; Wylie: Lhun-rtse rdzong-khag; previously "Lhuntshi", and officially spelled Lhuentse) is one of the 20 dzongkhag (districts) in Bhutan. It consists of 2506 households. Located in the northeast, Lhuentse is one of the least developed dzhongkhags of Bhutan. There are few roads, the first gas station was opened in September 2005, electricity is not well distributed, and the difficult terrain makes distribution of social welfare problematic. Despite its favorable climate, farming is hindered by the lack of infrastructure.

== Culture ==
Lhuentse is culturally part of eastern Bhutan. The languages and lifestyle of its inhabitants may be contrasted against the dominant western Ngalop culture.

This region is renowned as a textiles producing region and as the ancestral homeland of the Bhutanese royal family. It is also well known for the domestic tourism spots such as Singye Dzong, Sangwai Draduk, Rinchen Bumpa, Takila, Yamalung, Rawabee Lhakhang, Khampalung Ney Tshachu and Phuningla.

=== Alcohol ===
Eastern Bhutanese culture is distinctive in its high alcohol consumption in relation to other parts of Bhutan. Ara, the traditional alcohol of Bhutan, is most often home made from rice or maize, either fermented or distilled. It may only be legally produced and consumed privately. Ara production is unregulated in method and quality. Its sale has been prohibited in Bhutan and enforced since a severe crackdown. However, because ara returns far more profit than other forms of maize, many Bhutanese farmers have pressed for legal reform.

The Bhutanese government, meanwhile, is intent on discouraging excessive alcohol consumption, abuse, and associated diseases through taxation and regulation.

Through government efforts to reduce ara production and consumption in Lhuentse District, locals conceded in 2011 that something should be done to curb the distinctly eastern Bhutanese tradition of heavy drinking. The government's strategy is to reduce ara production and consumption gradually until it is eliminated. Alcoholism and ara production have been notable topics of political discussion Bhutan, especially at the local level. Ara, however, is culturally relevant for its religious and medicinal uses. In 2011, the government passed its Alcohol Control Regulation, which imposed up to three times the previous taxes on alcohol. As a result, alcohol sales have dropped and prices have risen.

=== Languages ===
Lhuentse is home to a variety of language groups. In the east, Dzala an East Bodish language, is spoken. In southern Lhuentse, Chocangacakha, a sister language to Dzongkha, is spoken. The northern and western parts of the district are known as the Kurtö region, where inhabitants speak the East Bodish Kurtöp language.

== Geography ==
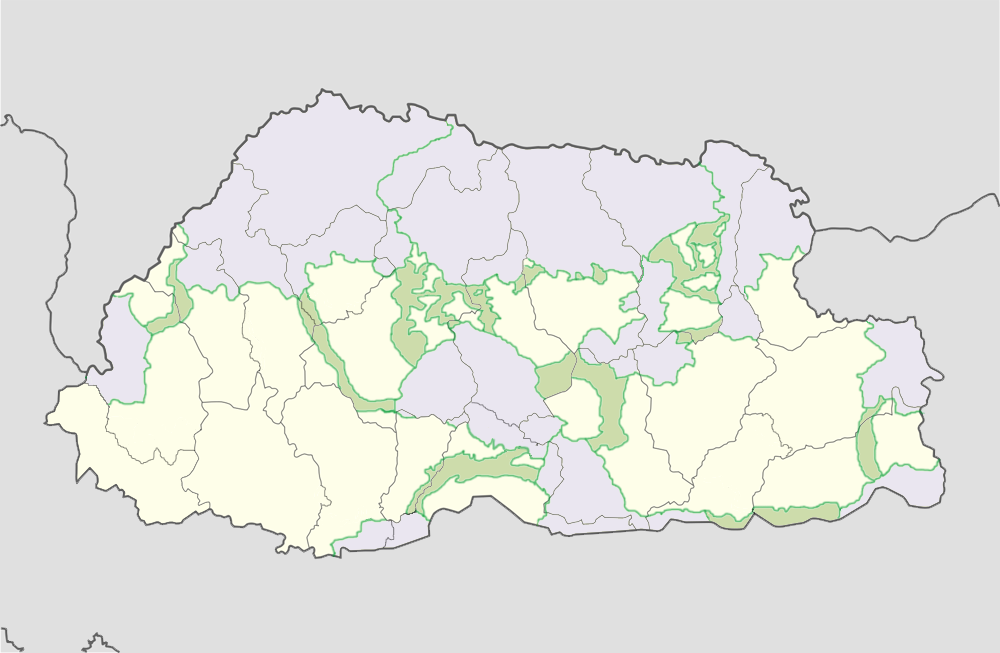
Protected areas in Lhuntse District: parks (lavender) and corridors (green).

Most of Lhuentse District is part of the environmentally protected areas of Bhutan. The district contains parts of Wangchuck Centennial Park in the north (the gewogs of Gangzur, Khoma and Kurtoed), Thrumshingla National Park in the south (the gewogs of Gangzur, Jarey and Metsho), and Bumdeling Wildlife Sanctuary in the east (the gewogs of Khoma and Minjay). These three parks are connected by biological corridors that crisscross the central and southern regions of the district.

== Administrative divisions ==
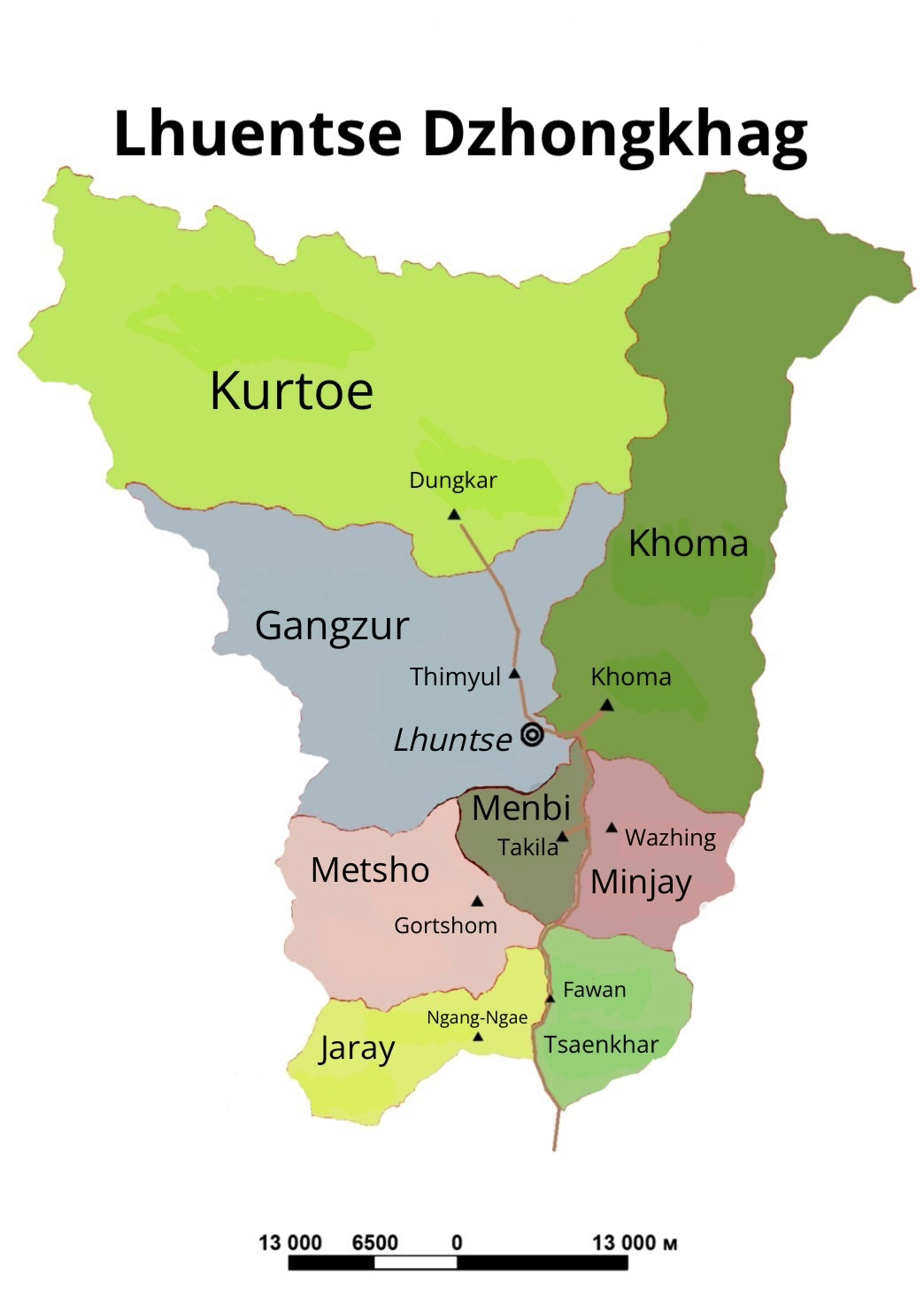
Gewogs of Lhuntse district, Bhutan

Lhuntse District is divided into eight village blocks (or gewogs):

- Gangzur Gewog
- Jaray Gewog
- Khoma Gewog
- Kurtoe Gewog
- Menbi Gewog
- Metsho Gewog
- Minjay Gewog
- Tsenkhar Gewog

Within these divisions are individual villages with small populations such as Autsho.

== Tourism ==
- Lhuentse Rinchentse Dzong
- Ka Bap Goendey
- Namdroling Goenzin Dratshang
- Neychhen Rinchen Bumpa
- Singye Dzong is a sacred site of Guru Rinpoche’s enlightened activity in Lhuentse at an altitude of more than 4482 meters. The Dzong is called Singye Dzong since the Dzong (rock) resembles a lion.
- Khojung Samdrup Choeling Goenpa
- Guru Statue, Takila
- Khoma Lhakhang

== Gallery ==
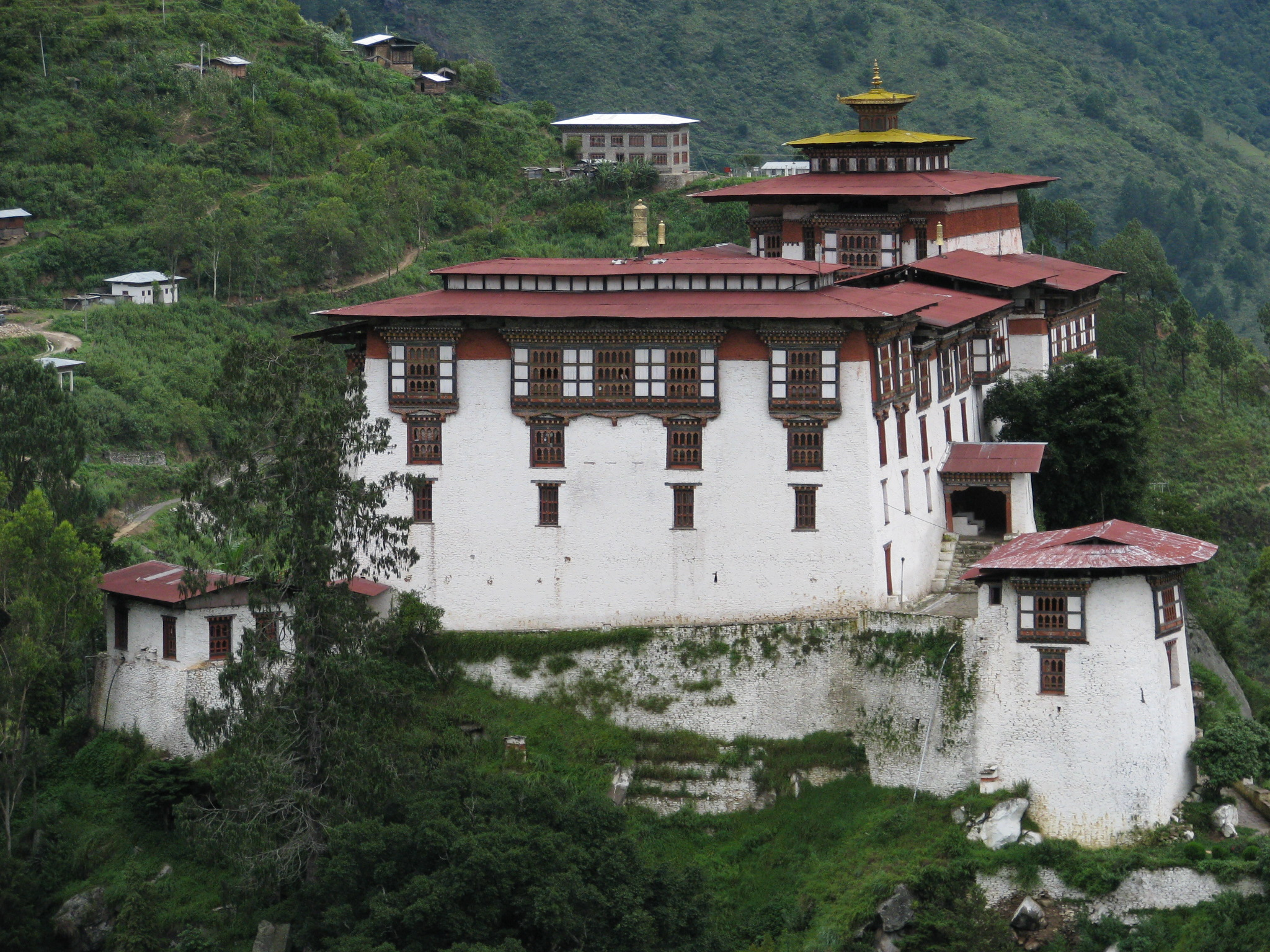
Back side view Lhuentse Dzong

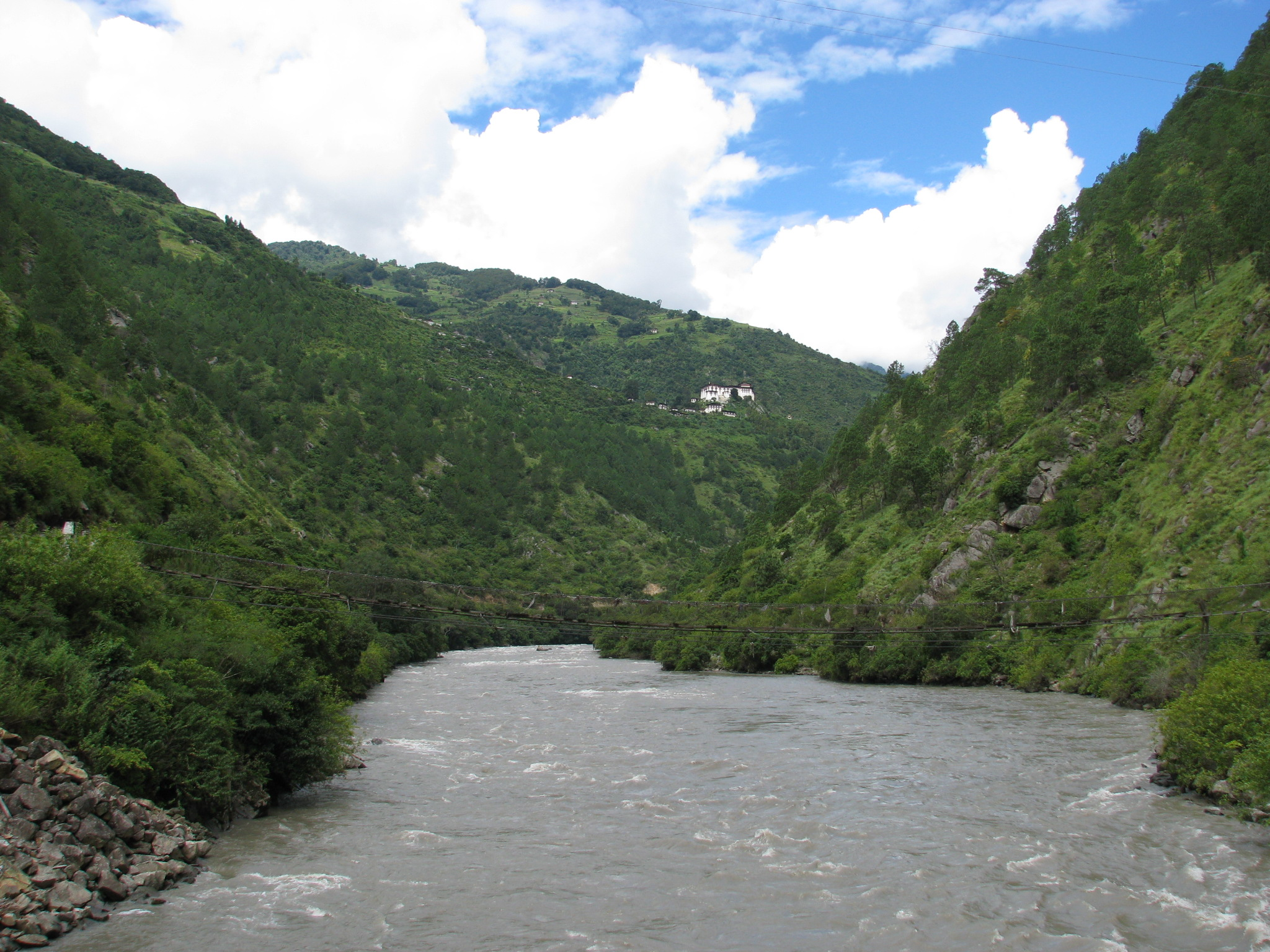
Kuri Chu river flowing below the Lhuentse Dzong

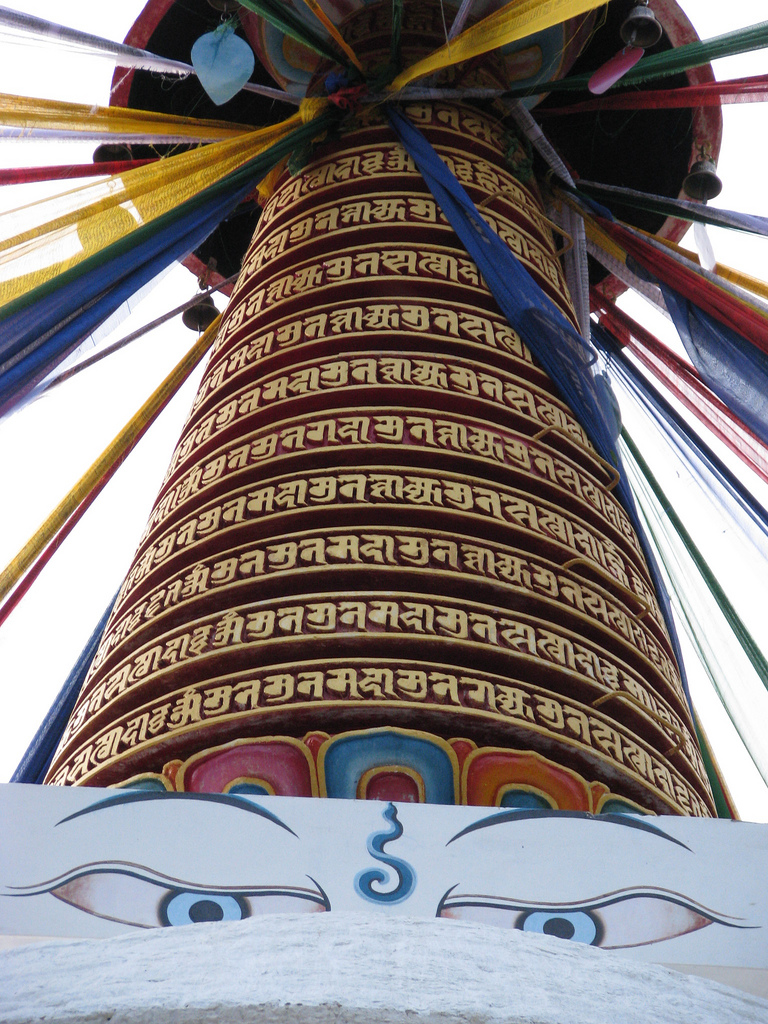
Chorten below Lhuentse Dzong

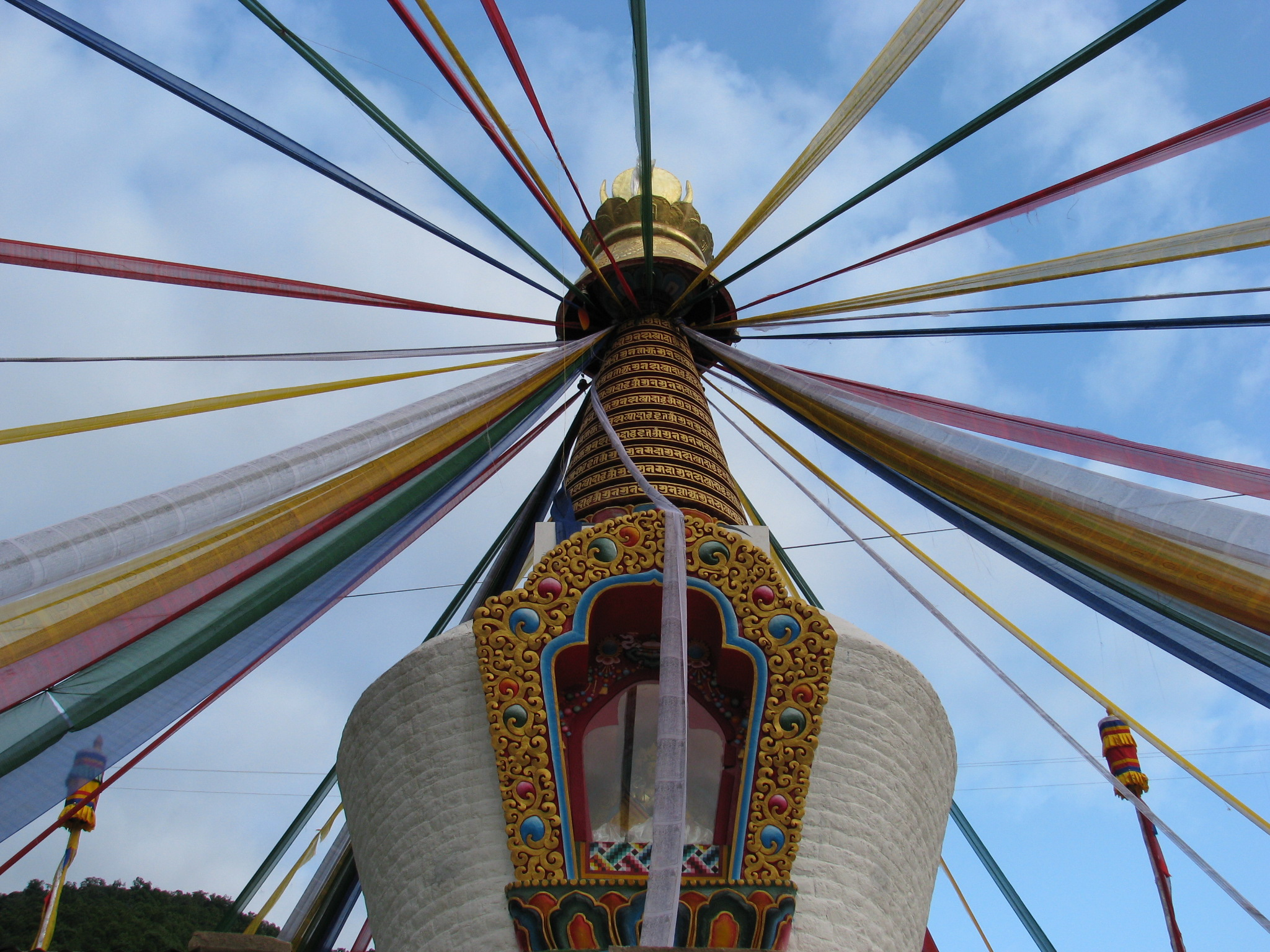
Close view of Chorten

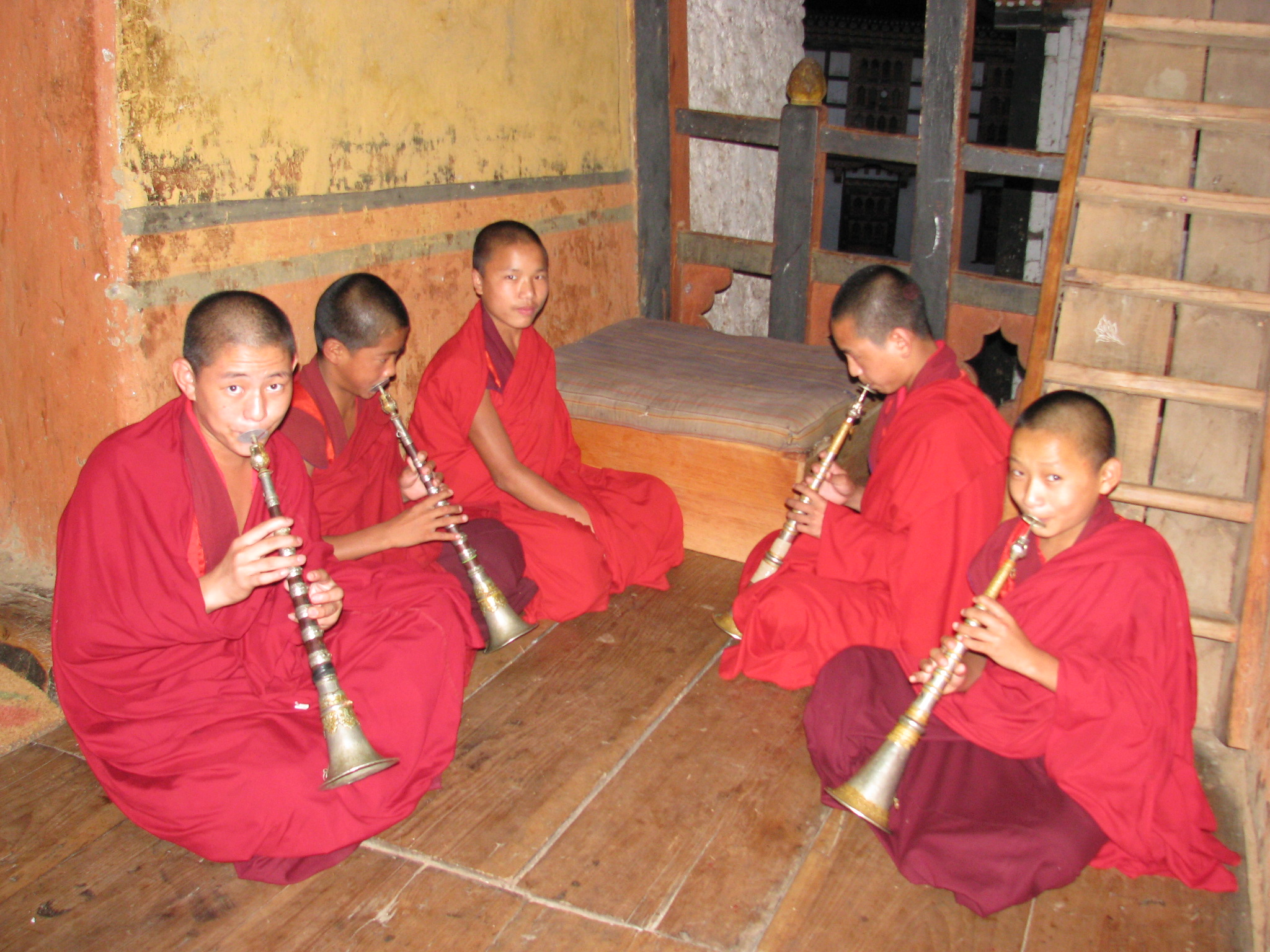
Musician monks

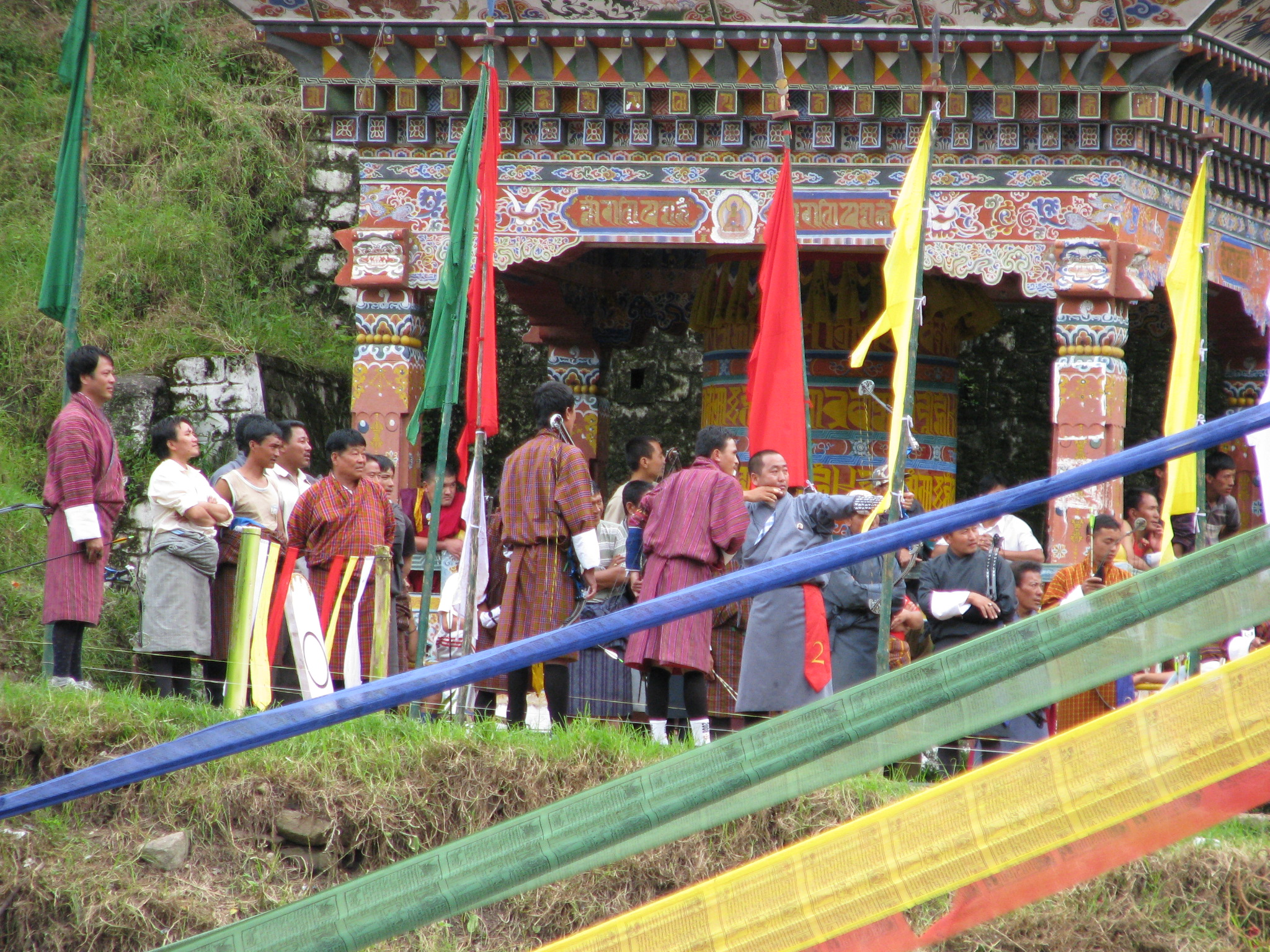
Archery tournament at Lhuentse Dzong

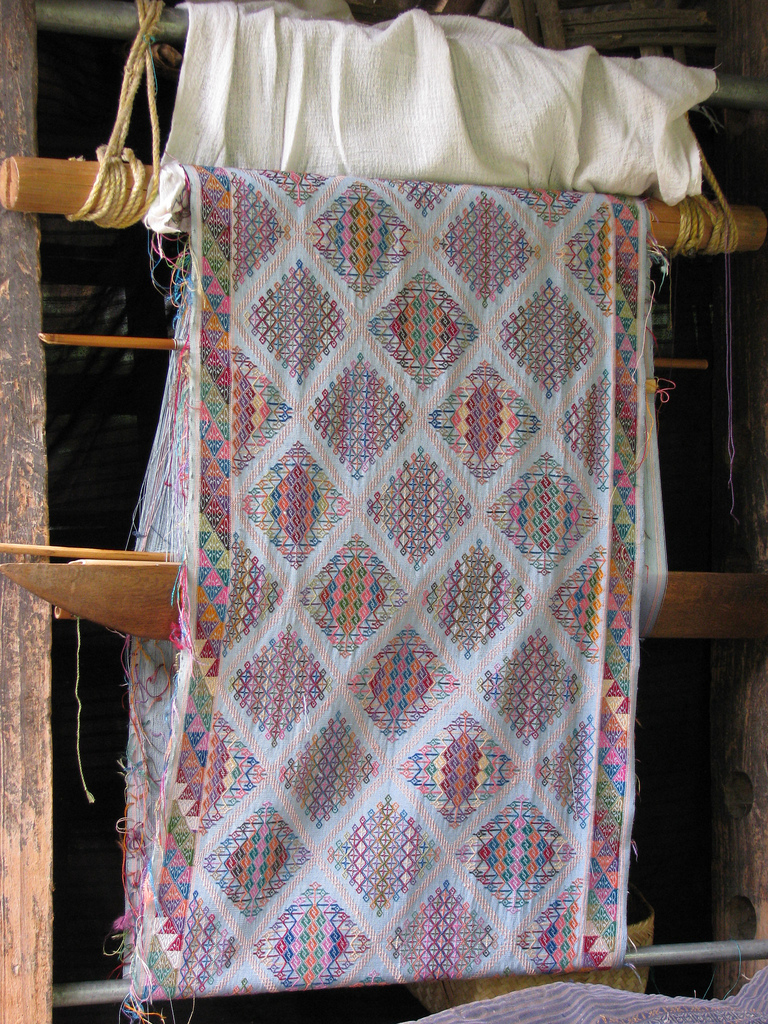
On the weaver's loom

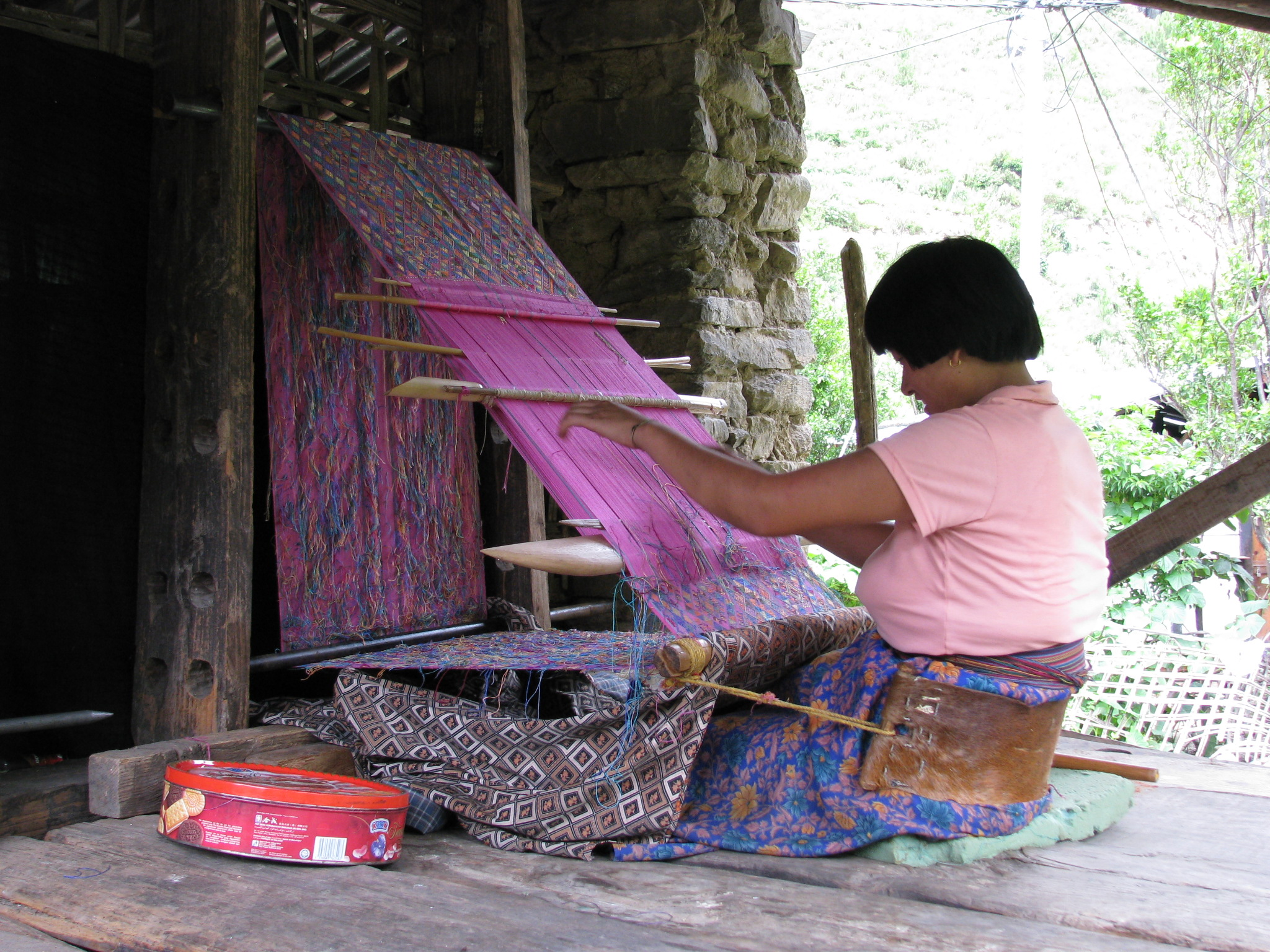
A weaver at work

== Towns and settlements in Lhuntse District ==
- Khenpa Dzong
- Lhuntse

== See also ==
- Districts of Bhutan
- Khoma
- Kurtöp language
- Kurtoed Province
