= Françoise Pommaret =

French Tibetologist

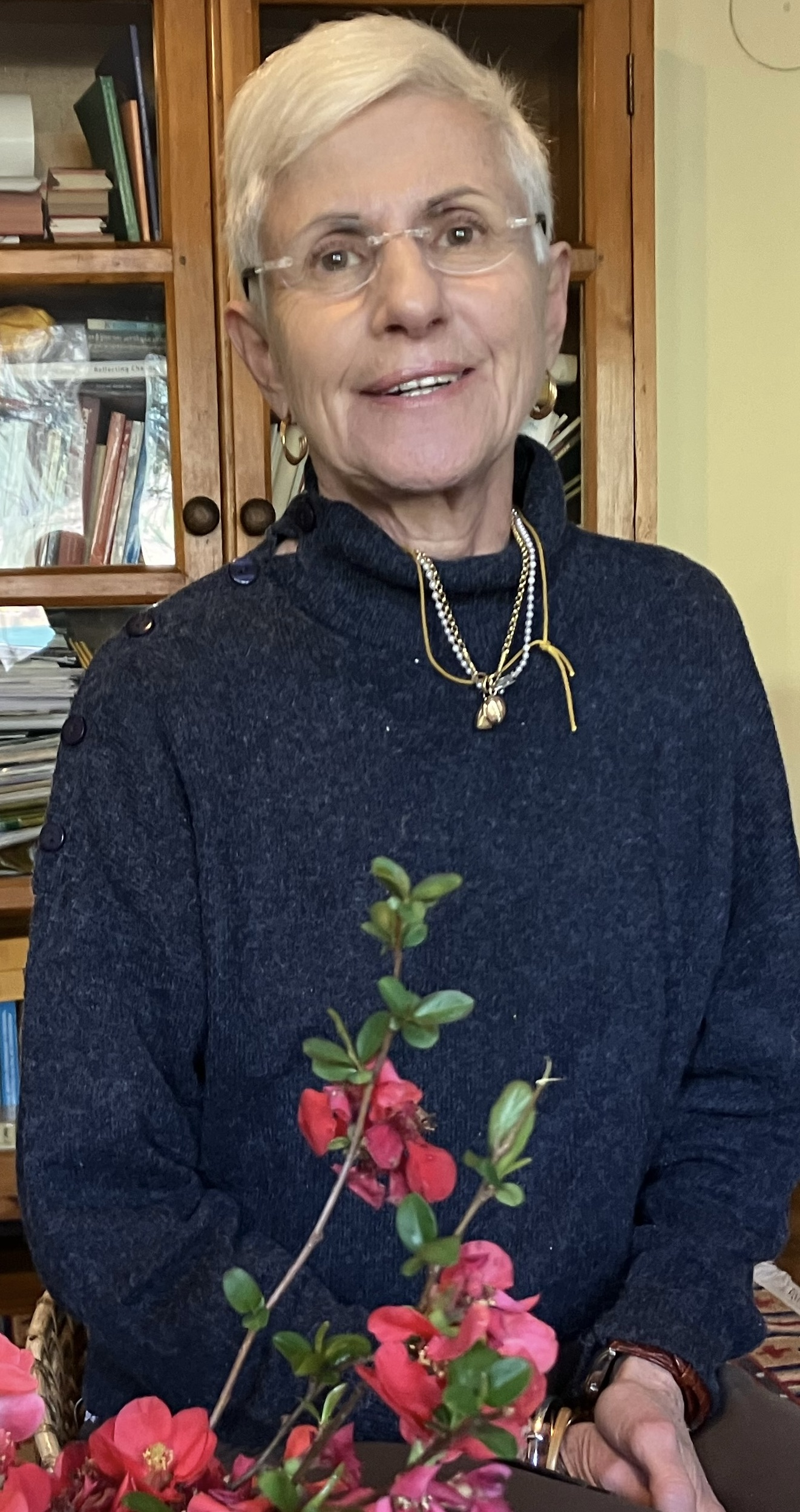
- Associate Professor Françoise Pommaret at her home in Thimphu, Bhutan, March 2023.
- Born: 1954 (age 71–72); France
- Education: Sorbonne; Institut national des langues et civilisations orientales
- Occupations: Tibetologist, Anthropologist, Author, Professor
- Scientific career
- Fields: Tibetan studies, Anthropology, International relations
- Workplaces: Royal University of Bhutan

Françoise Pommaret (born 1954) is a French ethno-historian and Tibetologist.

== Early life and education ==
Pommaret grew up in the Congo. She received her Master of Arts in the history of art and archeology from the Sorbonne University and completed her studies in Tibetan at the Institut national des langues et civilisations orientales (INALCO). Her doctoral thesis on "People who come back from the netherland in the Tibetan cultural areas" received the prix Delalande-Guérineau from the Académie des Inscriptions et Belles-Lettres.

== Career ==
She holds the position of Director of Research Emeritus at the Centre National de la Recherche Scientifique (CNRS) in Paris. Her work focuses on cultural anthropology in Bhutan and she has published extensively on different aspects of Bhutanese culture.

She has worked in Bhutan since 1981 and with the Bhutan Tourism Corporation between 1981 and 1986, after which she participated in educational and cultural projects in Bhutan. She has been a consultant for UNESCO as well as guest-curator for exhibitions. She lectures around the world on aspects of Bhutanese history and culture.

Pommaret works as Associate Professor and adviser to the College of Language and Culture Studies (CLCS), Royal University of Bhutan and worked as scientific advisor to the Bhutan Cultural Atlas.

Pommaret is also honorary consul of France in Bhutan and the president of the association of Amis du Bhoutan (friends of Bhutan, founded 1987).

== Awards and recognitions ==
For her contribution to cultural research in Bhutan, she is the recipient of the French award Légion d'honneur (2015) and the National Order of Merit (Bhutan), first class (Gold) in 2017.

== Publications ==
1982: Thimphu Tshechu Festival, Dept of Tourism, Bhoutan (sous le pseudonyme de Tashi Wangmo).

1983: Paro Tshechu Festival, Dpt of Tourism, Bhoutan (sous le pseudonyme de Tashi Wangmo).

1986: Wangdiphodrang festival, Dpt of Tourism, Bhoutan. Jampey Lhakhang festival, Dpt of Tourism, Bhoutan.

1989: Carte historique du Bhoutan (en collaboration avec le Service Géographique et le Département de l'Éducation du Bhoutan). Les revenants de l'au-delà dans le monde tibétain, Éditions du CNRS, Paris. Prix Delalande-Guérineau 1990 de l'Académie des Inscriptions et Belles-Lettres.

1997 Bhutan: Mountain-fortress of the Gods, C. Schicklgruber & F. Pommaret (eds.), Serindia, London.

1998 Les revenants de l'au-delà dans le monde tibétain, Editions du CNRS, Paris, (réed.). 1998 Bhutan: encuentro con los dioses en el Himalaya, Fundacio "La Caixa", Barcelona.

1980: "The construction of Ladakhi houses in the Indus Valley" in Tibetan studies in honour of Hugh Richardson, Aris and Philips, Warminster, 249–255.

1983: "Auspicious symbols and luminous colours: the art and architecture of Bhutan" in Asian Culture, Bulletin of the Asian Cultural Centre for UNESCO, n° 35, 30–35.

1987: "Le monastère de gTam zhing (Tamshing) au Bhoutan central" in Arts Asiatiques, tome XLII, 1987, 19-30 (en collaboration avec Y. Imaeda).

1989: "A rainbow of colours. Notes on the symbolism of colours in Bhutan", in Asian Pacific Culture, Tokyo,1989, 7-9 (en collaboration avec Mynak Rinpoche).

1990: "Note sur la situation linguistique du Bhoutan et étude préliminaire des termes de parenté" in Indo-Tibetan Studies, London, 1990, 115-127 (en collaboration avec Y. Imaeda).

1992 "Les revenants de l'au-delà ('das log ): sources littéraires et tradition vivante, une première présentation", in Tibetan Studies: Proceedings of the 5th Seminar of the International Association for Tibetan Studies, Narita 1989, Naritasan Shinshoji, 1992 vol. 2, pp. 673– 686. "Introduction to the interest and problems of Bhutanese iconography" in Buddhist Studies: Present and Future, UNESCO, Paris, 1992, 46–49.

1994 - "Les fêtes aux divinités-montagnes Phyva au Bhoutan de l'Est", in Tibetan studies: Proceedings of the 6th Seminar of the International association for Tibetan Studies Fagernes1992, The Institute for comparative research in human culture, Oslo, 1994, vol. 2, 660–669. - "Textiles of Bhutan: way of life and symbol of identity" in Bhutan: aspects of culture and development, M. Hutt & M. Aris (eds), Kiscadale Asia Research series n°5, Gartmore, 1994, 173–189. - " 'Entrance-keepers of a hidden country': Preliminary notes on the Monpa of south-central Bhutan", in Tibet Journal, Special issue: Powerful places and spaces in Tibetan religious culture (ed.) T. Huber, vol.19, n°3, 1994, New-Delhi, 46–62.

1994 "Bhutan and its neighbors" with Diana K. Myers in From the Land of the Thunder Dragon: Textile Arts of Bhutan, Serindia - Peabody Essex Museum, London-Salem, 1994 (Eds. D.K. Myers, M. Aris & S. Bean) 47–70.

1994 "The fabric of Life in Bhutan (with Diana K. Myers) in From the Land of the Thunder Dragon: Textile Arts of Bhutan, Serindia - Peabody Essex Museum, London-Salem, 1994 (Eds. D.K. Myers, M. Aris & S. Bean) 71-80.

1994 "Cut and Stitched : Textiles made by men" (with Diana K. Myers) in From the Land of the Thunder Dragon: Textile Arts of Bhutan, Serindia - Peabody Essex Museum, London-Salem, 1994 (Eds. D.K. Myers, M. Aris & S. Bean) 143–166.

1996 "On local and mountain deities in Bhutan", in Reflections of the Mountain: Essays on the history and social meaning of the mountain cult in Tibet and the Himalaya, A.M. Blondeau & E. Steinkellner (eds), Österreichische Akademie der Wissenschaften, Wien, 1996, 39–56.

1997 - "Notes on the Stylistic & Historical connections between Bhutan & Southern Tibet", in Tibetan Art: Towards a definition of style (Jane Casey Singer & Philip Denwood, eds.), London, Laurence King publishing, 1997, 210–220. - "Le pilier/mégalithe de Nabji: un lieu surdéterminé du Bhoutan central" in Les Habitants du Toit du Monde : Hommage à Alexander W. Macdonald, Samten Karmay & Philippe Sagant (eds.), Société d'Ethnologie, Nanterre, 1997, 391–418. - "Ethnic Mosaic: the Peoples of Bhutan", in Bhutan: Mountain-fortress of the Gods, C. Schicklgruber & F. Pommaret (eds.), Serindia, London, 1997, 43–59. - "The Birth of a nation", in Bhutan: Mountain-fortress of the Gods, C. Schicklgruber & F. Pommaret (eds.), Serindia, London, 1997, 179–208. - "The Way to the throne", in Bhutan: Mountain-fortress of the Gods, C. Schicklgruber & F. Pommaret (eds.), Serindia, London, 1997, 209- 235.

1998 - "Maîtres des trésors" (gTer bdag) : Divinités locales et médiums au Bhoutan", in Tibetan Mountain Deities, their cults and representations, Proceedings of the 8th IATS conference Graz, A.M. Blondeau (ed.), Österreichische Akademie der Wissenschaften, Wien, vol.6, 1998, 79–98.

- "Bhutan: una presentacion", Bhutan: encuentro con los dioses en el Himalaya, Fundacio "La Caixa", Barcelona, 1998, 17–31.

- "Un repaso historico", Bhutan: encuentro con los dioses en el Himalaya, Fundacio "La Caixa", Barcelona, 1998, 33-49

- "El Arte de Bhutan", Bhutan: encuentro con los dioses en el Himalaya, Fundacio "La Caixa", Barcelona, 1998, 67–87.

1999 - "Traditional Values, new trends", Bhutan: a fortress at the edge of time ?, Selected Papers of the Bhutan Seminar 1998, Vienna: VIDC-Austrian Development Cooperation, 1999, 13–26.

- "The Mon pa revisited: in search of Mon", in Sacred Spaces and Powerful Places in Tibetan culture, Toni Huber (ed.), Dharamsala: Tibetan Library of Works and Archives, 1999 : 52–73.

- "Notes sur le négoce entre le Bhoutan, le Bengale et l'Assam", in Journal Asiatique, 1999, 287.1, 285–303.

2000 - "Rouge est le Sang : Le Bétel au Bhoutan", Opiums: les plantes du plaisir et de la convivialité en Asie, P. Le Failler & A. Hubert (eds), l'Harmattan, Paris 2000, 25–38.

- "Ancient Trade Partners: Bhutan, Cooch Bihar and Assam (17th to 19th centuries)", in Journal of Bhutan Studies, vol. 2 n°1, Center for Bhutan Studies, Thimphu, summer 2000, 30-53 (traduction révisée et augmentée de l'article paru dans le Journal Asiatique 1999).

"Recent Bhutanese scholarship in History and Anthropology", in Journal of Bhutan Studies: Special issue on the Bhutan panel of the European South Asian Modern Studies Conference Edinburgh University 2000, Centre for Bhutan studies, Thimphu, vol.2 n° 2, Winter 2000, 139 -163.

2001 - "Bhutanese students' discovery of fieldwork: culture shock and identity", in The Pandita and the Siddha. Tibetan Studies in Honour of E. Gene Smith, R. Prats & D. Jackson (eds.), 2001, en CD rom. A paraître aussi sous forme de livre, Amnye Machen Publications, Dharamsala.

"Bhoutan : une fortresse au bord du temps ? valeurs traditionnelles et orientations nouvelles" in Ruptures ou mutations au tournant du XXIe siècle. Changements de géographie mentale ? Rita Régnier ed.), l'Harmattan Collection Eurasie n°10, Paris, 2001, 91–107.

2002 "La danse des 'Huit Catégories de Dieux et Démons' au Bhoutan", in Katia Buffetrille & H. Diemberger (eds.), Territory and Identity in Tibet and the Himalayas, Tibetan Studies in honour of Anne-Marie Blondeau, Proceedings of the 9th IATS, Leyden, Brill, Leiden 2002, 159–178.

"Weaving hidden threads: Some ethno-historical clues on the artistic affinities between Eastern Bhutan and Arunachal Pradesh", The Tibet Journal, E. Lo Bue (ed.), vol.XXVII n°1&2, Spring & Summer 2002, Dharamsala, 177–196.

2003 "Etres soumis, Etres protecteurs : Padmasambhava et les Huit Catégories de Dieux et Démons au Bhoutan", in Revue d'Études Tibétaines n°2, Revue électronique de l'UMR 8047, CNRS, Paris, Avril 2003, 40–66. En ligne sur www.digitalhimalaya.com

"Historical and religious relations between Lhodrak (Southern Tibet) and Bumthang (Bhutan) from the 18th to the early 20th century: Preliminary data", in Tibet and her neighbours. Proceedings of the History of Tibet Conference St Andrews University 2001, A. McKay (ed.), Ed. Hansjörg Mayer, London, 91–106.

"Buddhist monasteries in Tibet" in P. Pichard and F. Lagirarde (eds.), The Buddhist Monastery. A cross -cultural legacy. EFEO (Ecole Française d'Extrême-Orient) Paris, 2003, 283–304.

2004 "The fascinating life of Lama Changchub Tsöngru (1817-1856) according to his biography" in K. Ura & S. Kinga (eds.), The Spider and the Piglet. Proceedings of the 1st International seminar on Bhutanese Studies 2003, Thimphu: Centre for Bhutan Studies, 73–89.

"Yul and Yul lha: the territory and its deity in Bhutan", in Bulletin of Tibetology, Gangtok: Namgyal Institute of Tibetology, vol 40 (1) May 2004. Vol 40 no 1, 39–67.

"Rituels non-bouddhiques de Kheng 'Bu li (Bhoutan)", Proceedings of the 8th IATS seminar Bloomington 1998, in Revue d'Études Tibétaines (RET) n°6, Octobre 2004, 60–77.

2006 "La dernière frontière himalayenne: Evangélistes et tentative de colonisation des âmes", in Religion et politique en Asie, J. Lagerwey (ed.), Les Indes Savantes, Paris, 2006, 133–156.

"Dances in Bhutan. A traditional medium of information", Journal of Bhutan Studies, vol.14 summer 2006, 26–35. Available online at www.bhutanstudies.org.bt

2007 "Estate and deities: A ritual from central Bhutan. The bskang gso of O rgyan chos gling" in J. Ardussi & F. Pommaret (eds), Bhutan. Traditions and changes. Proceedings of the XIth IATS Oxford 2003, Brill, Leiden, 2007. 135–158. Recovering identity : Students' fieldwork in Bhutan", in Ramon N. Prats (ed.), The Pandita and the Siddha, Tibetan Studies in Honour of E. Gene Smith, Amnye Machen Institute, Dharamsala, 2007, 210–217. Reprint "Dances in Bhutan. A traditional medium of information", in Media & public culture. Proceedings of the 2nd International Seminar on Bhutan studies CBS, Thimphu, 2007, 31–39.

2008 - Preface. "Holding the name high", in Revue d'Études Tibétaines — numéro 14 — Octobre 2008 TIBETAN STUDIES IN HONOR OF SAMTEN KARMAY, Part I — Historical, Cultural and Linguistic Studies Edited by Françoise Pommaret and Jean-Luc Achard, iii-v. http://www.digitalhimalaya.com/collections/journals/ret/index.php?selection=13

- "The Messed Up Books"(Pecha trok wa la). A personal recollection of Samten G. Karmay and the O rgyan chos gling catalogue (Bhutan), in Revue d'Études Tibétaines — numéro 14 — Octobre 2008 TIBETAN STUDIES IN HONOR OF SAMTEN KARMAY, Part I — Historical, Cultural and Linguistic Studies Edited by Françoise Pommaret and Jean-Luc Achard, 7–12. http://www.digitalhimalaya.com/collections/journals/ret/index.php?selection=13

"Protectors of Bhutan. The role of Guru Rinpoche and the Eight Categories of Gods and Demons (lHa srin sde brgyad)", in John Ardussi & Sonam Tobgay (eds.), Written Treasures of Bhutan. Mirror of the past and bridge to the future. Proceedings of the First international Conference on the rich scriptural heritage of Bhutan, National Library of Bhutan, Thimphu, 2008, 305–340.

2009 - "Bon and chos, community rituals in Bhutan", in Antonio Terrone & Sarah Jacoby (eds.) Buddhism Beyond the Monastery, Proceedings of the Xth IATS Oxford 2003, Brill. Leiden, 2009, 111–144.

3- Wide audience books

-1984: Bhoutan. Un royaume de l'Himalaya. Genève. Olizane. (en collaboration avec G. Van Strydonck et Y. Imaeda) (existe également en anglais, italien et japonais). - 1988: History of Bhutan, a teachers' handbook, Dpt of Education, Thimphu. - 1989: Bhutan, a kingdom of the Eastern Himalayas, 2ème édition, London-Boulder . - 1990: Bhutan, a handbook, Genève-Hong-Kong-London. - 1991: The History of Bhutan class 8, Dpt of Education, Thimphu, Bhutan. - 1993: Bhutan, a pocket guidebook, Apa publications, Singapore. - 1994 A History of Bhutan class 9–10, Dpt of Education, Thimphu, Bhutan (en collaboration).

-1997 A History of Bhutan, coursebook for class X, Education Division, Thimphu (en collaboration). - 1997: Bhoutan, Eds Olizane, Genève (réed.).

- 2002:

- Bhoutan, Eds Olizane, Genève (ed. révisée et augmentée).
- Le Tibet : Une civilisation blessée, coll. « Découvertes Gallimard » (nº 427), série Histoire. Paris: Éditions Gallimard, 2002.
  - US edition – Tibet: An Enduring Civilization, "Abrams Discoveries" series. New York: Harry N. Abrams, 2003.
  - UK edition – Tibet: Turning the Wheel of Life, 'New Horizons' series. London: Thames & Hudson, 2003.
  - JP edition – Chibetto, "Chi no Saihakken" series (no.112). Tokyo: Sogensha, 2003.
  - RO edition – Tibetul: O civilizație rănită, "Colecțiile Cotidianul Enciclopedica" (Seria a III-a, volumul II). Editura Univers, 2007.

2003 Bhutan guidebook, Odyssey publications (revised ed.), Hong-Kong-London, 2003.

Bhutan, Eds Temmen (revised ed.), Bremen, 2003.

2005

- Le Bhoutan : Au plus secret de l'Himalaya, collection « Découvertes Gallimard » (nº 469), série Culture et société. Paris: Éditions Gallimard.

2006 Bhutan. Himalayan Mountain Kingdom. Odyssey Guidebooks, Hong-Kong-Leicester-New York (revised and expanded edition).

2007 Bhutan. Himalayan Mountain Kingdom. Odyssey Guidebooks, Hong-Kong-Leicester-New York (7th revised and expanded edition). Bhoutan, Guides Olizane, Genève, (4e édition revue et corrigée). Bhutan, Eds Temmen, Bremen (4e édition revue et corrigée)

2008 Bhutan, Eds Wydawnictwo M" Publishing House Kraków, Pologne (1e édition) Bhutan, (1e édition) eds. Windows on the World Publishing Co, Bangkok, Thailande

2009 2007 Bhutan. Himalayan Mountain Kingdom. Odyssey Guidebooks, Hong-Kong-Leicester-New York (8th revised and expanded edition)

2021 Divine Messengers: The Untold Story of Bhutan’s Female Shamans, coll. Francoise Pommaret, Shambhala.

4) Wide audience Articles

1980: "Fêtes du monde tibétain", in Fêtes du monde en Asie, Paris, pp. 90–96 (en collaboration avec Y.Imaeda).

1981: "The religious culture of Bhutan and Tourism", in Background Presentation :Workshop on development planning and tourism in Bhutan, Thimphu, 1–10.

1987 : "Le Bhoutan: forteresse bouddhique de l'Himalaya", in Atlas Air France, janvier 1987, 64–80. (en collaboration avec Y. Imaeda et G. Van Strydonck).

1988: - "Bhutan" in Apa Guide South Asia, Singapour. - "Les textiles du Bhoutan" in Bulletin de l'Association des Amis de l'Orient, Paris. - "Récits de retour" in Revenant de la Mort, Paris (édition d'art).

1991 - "An excursion to Bhutan" in Calcutta City Guide, Apa Insight guide, Singapore, 233-239 - Notes on a collection of kiras purchased in Bhutan in The Society for Asian Art Newsletter, San Francisco, vol.30 n°2 p. 7, winter 1990-1991 and vol.30 n°3 p. 6 spring 1991 - Programme Bhoutan du Festival d'Automne, Paris

1992 "Bhoutan: le pays du dragon paisible" in Atlas Air France, Août 1992, 113- 128

1994 "Bhoutan", in Le Figaro-Magazine, 12 March 1994, 80–92. "Bhutan" in India Handbook 1995, London, 1994, 1287–1304.

1996 "Bhutan", in Tibet Handbook, Footprint Handbooks, London, 698–745.

1997 "Returning from hell", Religions of Tibet in Practice, D. Lopez (ed). Princeton University Press, 499–510.

"Avant-propos" Lhasa : Terre du divin, F. Pommaret (ed) Editions Olizane, Genève,. 11–18.

"The Art of Bhutan" in The Dictionary of Art, Macmillan Publications, London, 912–916.

"Bhoutan, éternel et magique" Amateur d'art, Point de Vue n° 2572, Novembre 97, 38–40.

- 1998 "Ces monastères où la vie bat son plein", Geo, Janvier 1998, 12–23.

"Le Bhoutan aujourd'hui", Bhoutan entre Inde et Tibet, catalogue de l'exposition Bhoutan, Centre Culturel de l'Abbaye de Daoulas, Daoulas, 1998, 16–19.

1999 "Bhutan", in Tibet Handbook, (Gyurme Dorje ed.), Footprint Handbooks, Bath, 1999, 825–866. Participation à Bhutan Civics, coursebook for class IX-X, CAPSS, Education Division, Thimphu.

2000 "Le Bhoutan: la diversité culturelle d'un petit pays", Partenaire, n°162 Helvetas, Zürich, Novembre 2000, 6-9 (ed. en français) "The Cultural diversity of Bhutan", Partnership : Bhutan, Helvetas, Zürich, n°162 Nov.2000, 1-4 (ed. en anglais)

2001 "Bhutan: a kingdom of the Himalayas". In Collectif. The living religious & cultural traditions of Bhutan. catalogue, Dept of Culture India, the National Commission for Cultural Affairs, Bhutan. New-Delhi 2001. 1–11.

2002 "Remembering Michael Aris: his role in Bhutanese studies and a personal tribute", in Tibetan Studies III. Impressions of Bhutan and Tibetan Art, Proceedings of the 9th IATS, Leyden, J. Ardussi & H. Blezer (eds.), Brill, Leiden 2002, 31–35.

"Le Bhoutan: défi ou miracle himalayen", in M. Ricard et D.Föllmi (eds), Himalaya bouddhiste, La Martinière, Paris, 2002, 104–106.

"Introduction et notes", Le voyage de Samuel Turner au Bhoutan et au Tibet, traduction française de 1800, Eds. Findakly, Suilly La Tour, 2002.

Notices d'objets dans Rituels tibétains: visions secrètes du 5e Dalai Lama, Catalogue de l'exposition du Musée Guimet (6 novembre 2002- 26 février 2003), RMN, Paris, 2002 (auteurs N. Bazin, A. Heller, S. Karmay, P. Cornu, L. Upansky, F. Pommaret).

2003 Introduction, Lhasa in the 17th century, the capital of the Dalai-Lamas, traduction révisée et augmentée en anglais de l'ouvrage publié en français 1997, F. Pommaret (ed.), Tibetan Studies Series, Brill, Leiden- Boston, ix-xvi.

"The tradition of betel and areca in Bhutan", Journal of Bhutan Studies, vol.8 summer 2003, 12–28.

2004 "Himalaya: la colonisation des âmes" in Cahiers de Médiologie 17 "Missions", Paris : Fayard, 140–147.

"Le Bhoutan et la recherche en sciences humaines", Editorial Réseau Asie www.reseau-asie.com Août 2004.

"Notice de masques de squelettes", La danse de la mort (ouvrage collectif) Suilly La Tour : Ed. Findakly.

"Bhutan: A kingdom of the Eastern Himalayas 1974-1982", interactive CD-rom produced by the National Library of Bhutan. Bilingue: français-anglais. Photos Guy van Strydonck, textes Françoise Pommaret.

"Bhutan Archery Federation. Revitalizing Tradition" Prince Claus Awards. The Positive Results of asylum and Migration, The Netherlands, The Hague, 43–45.

2005 "Tibetan religions. History of study", in The Encyclopedia of Religion, Second Edition, 14, Thomson Gale, Macmillan. 9187–9192. "Worship and devotional life: Buddhist Devotional life in Tibet, in The Encyclopedia of Religion, Second Edition, 14, Thomson Gale, Macmillan. 9839-9842. "Nécessaire de chiqueur", Cent ans d'ethnographie sur la colline de Saint Nicolas (1904–2004), ( M.O. Gonseth, J. Hainard et R. Kaehr, Musée d'Ethnographie de Neuchâtel, Neuchâtel, 2005, 278–281. - "Danses pour un temps futur" Cité Musiques La revue de la Cité de la Musique, n°49 septembre-decembre 2005, 17. - Himalaya, Notes de programme dans le cadre du cycle la vie et la mort, Cité de la Musique Paris, Octobre 2005.

"Bhoutan: danses pour un temps futur", pp. 22–23. "Chants traditionnels Zhungdra", pp. 25–26. "Sonneries de trompes", p. 28. "Le Cham, rituels et danses masquées", pp. 30–32. "Chants traditionnels Zhungdra, Boedra et Gurma", pp. 34–35.

2006 "Bhoutan. La chanson de Laya", Montagnes, Juillet 2006, 66–71. "The Treasures houses of Bhutan" in Bhutan, Department of Tourism, Thimphu, 2006, 38–43. "The dance of the drums from Drametse", Bhutan Now, November 2006, 20–25.

2007 "Bhoutan, la belle vallée des gens de Laya", Animan, Août- Septembre 2007, p. 27-33. "Palaces of Bhutan" in Bhutan, Department of Tourism, Thimphu, 2007, 32–36. "Monpas. Les gardiens du Pays caché" Grands Reportages, Décembre 2007, 84–88. "Bhutan. Im Tal der Laya", Terra, Oktober/November/Dezember 2007, 62–73.

2008 "The Dung and Shelngo families: A glimpse of Bhutan's early history" in Pek Dorji (ed.) Bhutan. Centenary Issue. Thimphu: Tourism Council of Bhutan, 86-93

5) Co-editor of Books

1997 - Lhasa: Terre du divin, Editions Olizane, Genève. - Bhutan: Mountain-fortress of the Gods, Serindia- Museum für Völkerkunde, London-Wien (en collaboration avec C. Schicklgruber) ( également édition en allemand)

1998 Bhoutan; entre Inde et Tibet, catalogue de l'exposition Bhoutan, Centre Culturel de l'Abbaye de Daoulas, Daoulas. Bhutan: Encuentro con los dioses en el Himalaya, Fundacio "La Caixa", Barcelona, 1999 (ed. avec C. Schicklgruber).

2003 Lhasa in the 17th century, the capital of the Dalai-Lamas, traduction révisée et augmentée en anglais de l'ouvrage publié en français 1997, Brill, Leiden.

2007 J. Ardussi & F. Pommaret (eds), Bhutan. Traditions and changes. Proceedings of the XIth IATS Oxford 2003, Brill, Leiden.

2008 Revue d'Études Tibétaines — numéro 14 — Octobre 2008 numero 15 Novembre 2008 TIBETAN STUDIES IN HONOR OF SAMTEN KARMAY Edited by Françoise Pommaret and Jean-Luc Achard www.digitalhimalaya.com
