= Lhuntse Dzong =

Fortress in Lhuntse, Bhutan

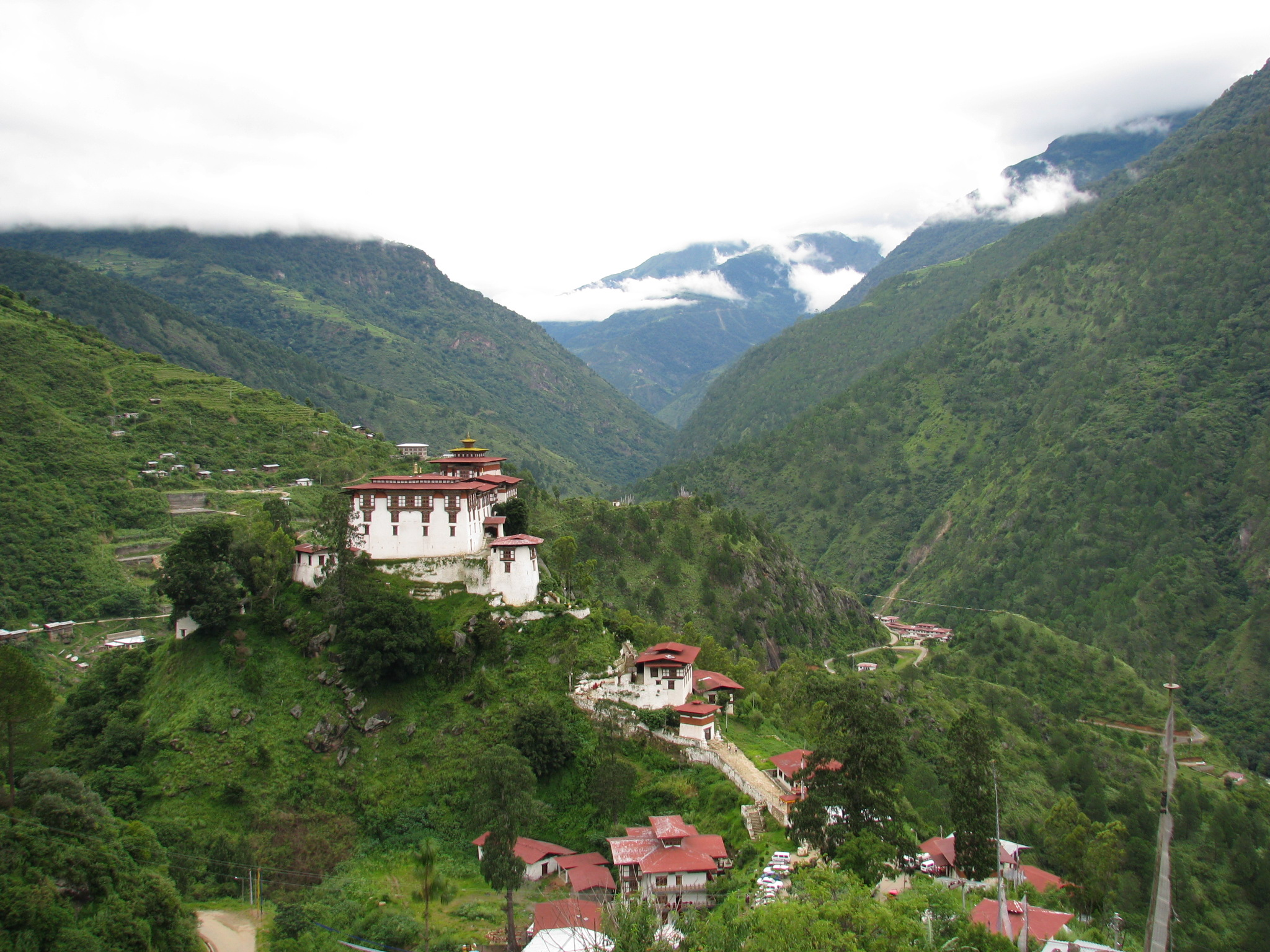
- Panoramic view of Lhuntse Dzong

- Location within Bhutan

Religion
- Affiliation: Tibetan Buddhism
- Sect: Nyingma
- Deity: Padmasambhava

Location
- Location: Lhuentse District, Bhutan
- Country: Bhutan
- Interactive map of Lhuntse Dzong
- Coordinates: 27°39′54″N 91°11′12″E

Architecture
- Style: Bhutanese dzong
- Founder: Kunga Wanpo (1543). Built by Chogyal Minjur Tenpa (1654)
- Established: 1543; 483 years ago

Lhuentse Dzong is a dzong and Buddhist monastery in Lhuentse District in eastern Bhutan. It lies on the eastern side of the Kuri Chhu and is perched on a spur at the end of a narrow valley.

The Dzong was initially known as Kurtoed in the then-isolated Lhuentse District. It is the ancestral home of the House of Wangchuck (Dasho Jigme Namgyal was born there in 1825).

While its geographic coordinates are in eastern Bhutan, its cultural roots are central Bhutanese. This was because before road traffic connected it to Mongar, the approach was through a trade route crossing Rodang Pass.

== Topography ==
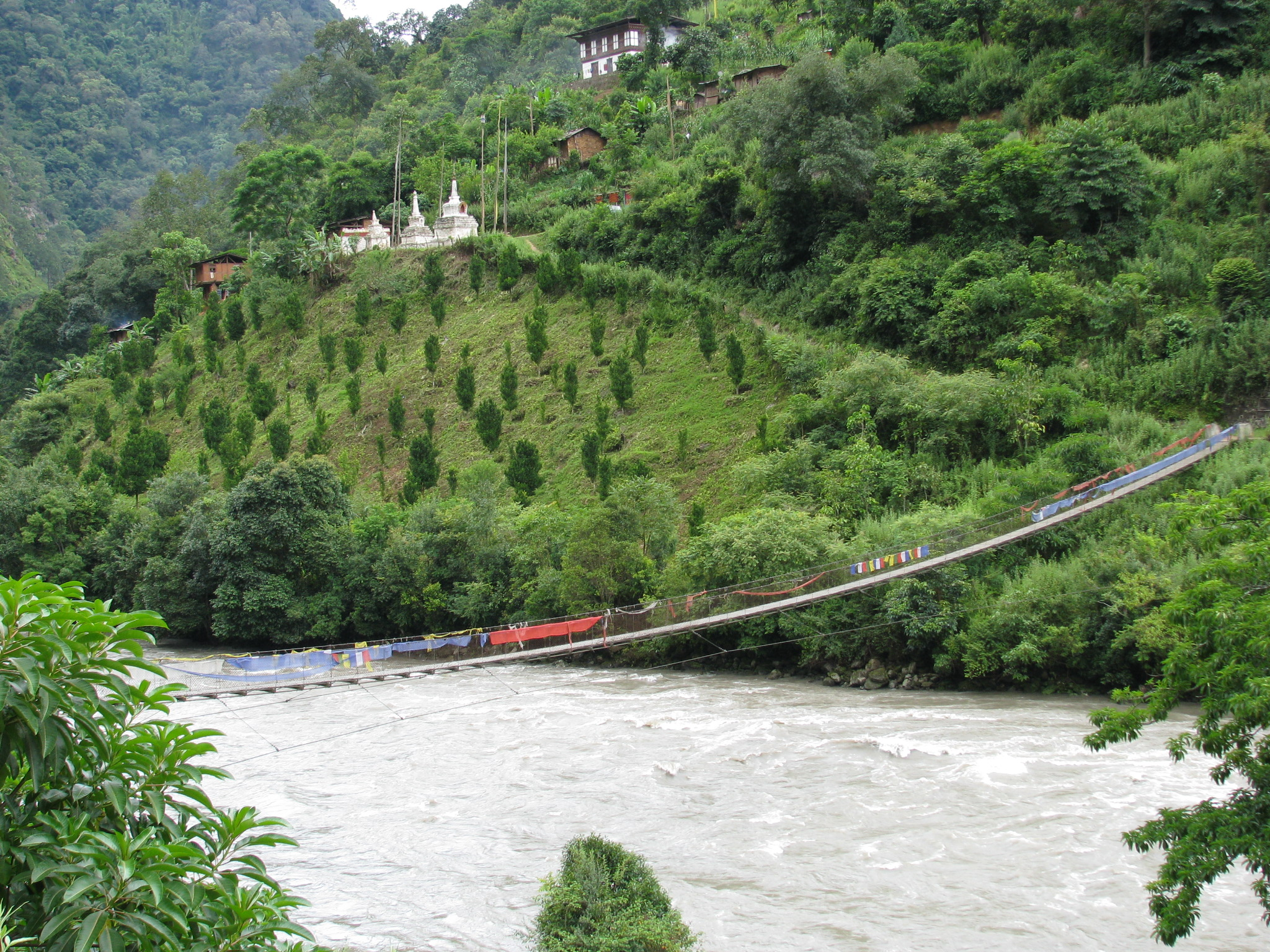
Suspension bridge across the Kuri Chhu river on the way to Chortens and the Dzong

The Dzong is located in the Kuri Chhu valley, which is part of the Lhuentse district. The Kuri Chhu is the major river that has formed the scenic valley with high peaks and steep hills. Kuri Chhu is a tributary of the Manas River system, which is the largest river of Bhutan and a major tributary of the Brahmaputra River that drains most of Eastern Bhutan.

The road from Mongar to Lheuntse Dzong is a 3 hours drive over a distance of 74 kilometres (46 mi) and 63 kilometres (39 mi) from its junction at Gangola. The approach to this Dzong is over a flag-stone-paved path over the steep cliffs.

== History ==
According to one legend, Khedrup Kuenga Wangpo, son of Tertön Pema Lingpa was assigned to find a ridge resembling the trunk of an elephant. He found one opposite Baeyul Khenpajong and meditated there. This location came to be known as Kurtoed Lhuentse Phodrang.

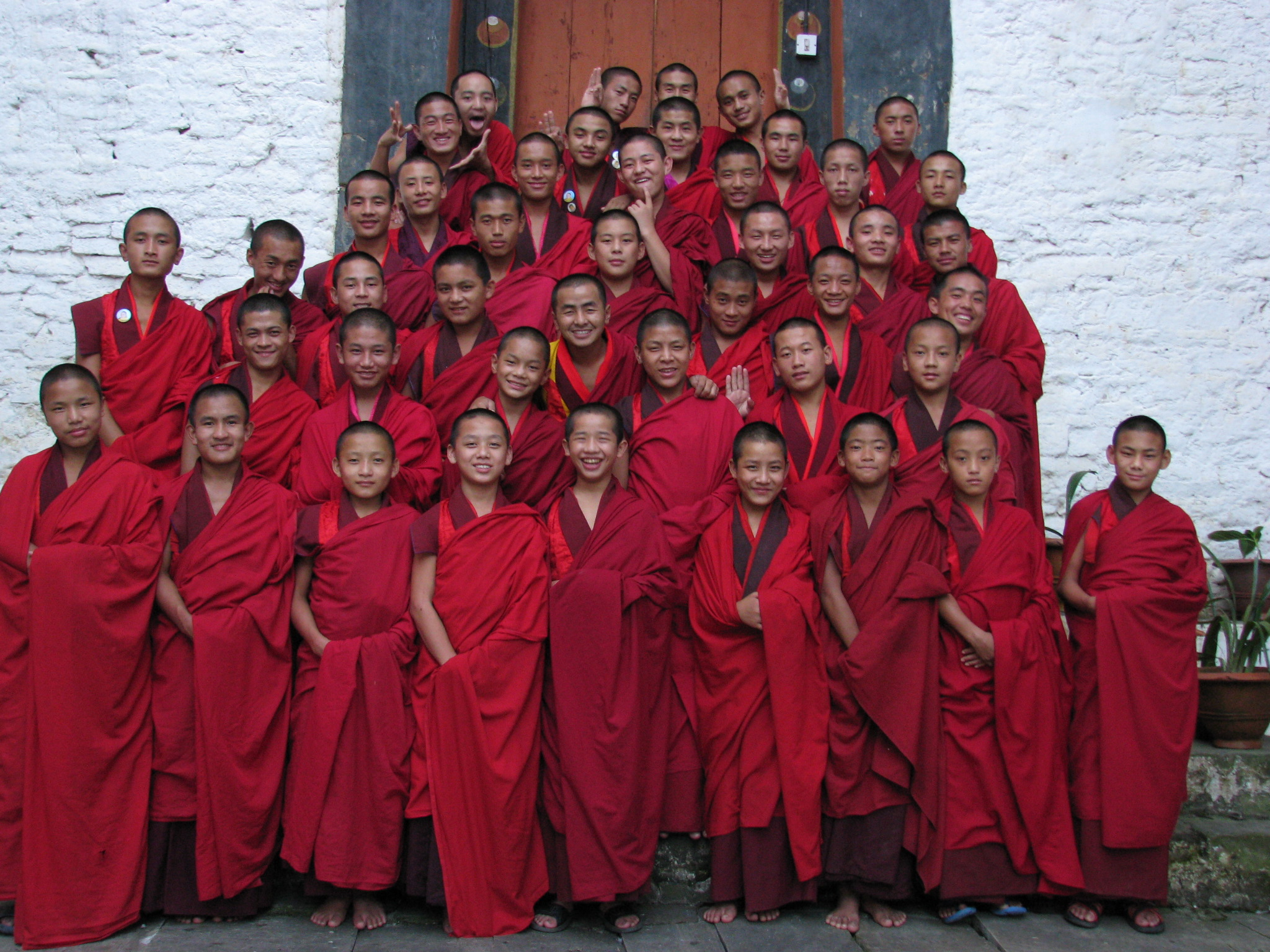
An assembly of student monks

The monastery was originally established by Pema Lingpa's son Kuenga Wanpo in 1543, although it wasn't until 1654 that the Trongsa penlop (governor), Minjur Tenpa, built a formal dzong here after winning a battle and named it Lhuentse Rinchentse. The dzong was later restored in 1962 and again between 1972 and 1974. The historic importance of Lhuentse Dzongkhag is on account of its established link as the ancestral home of the Wangchuck Dynasty. Lhuentse town is the administrative capital of Lhuentse District, besides the Lhuentse Dzong. At present 100 monks reside here.

== Architecture ==
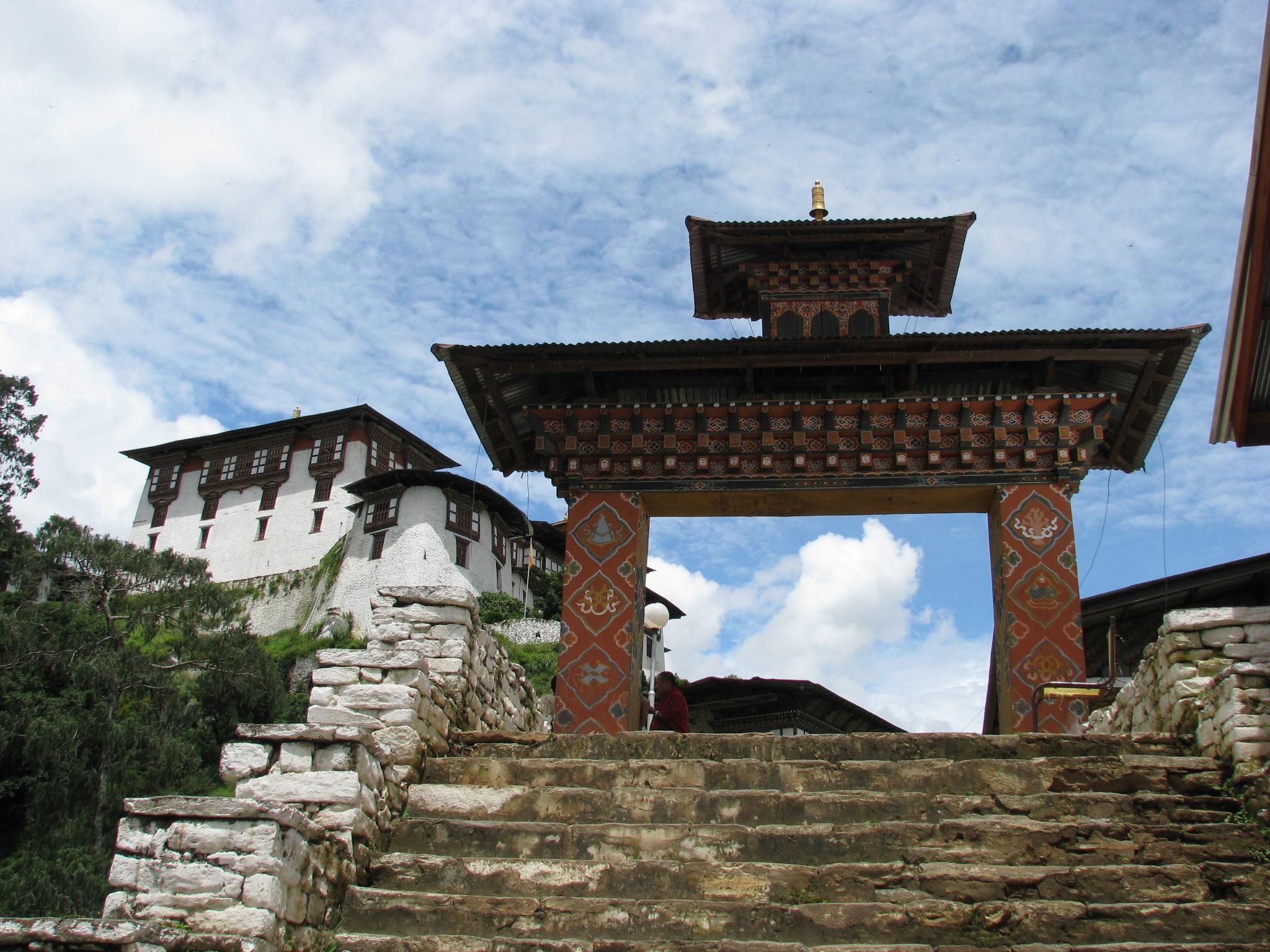
Entrance gate to the dzong

The dzong contains five temples, three of which are in the central tower and are dedicated to Padmasambhava. The dzong also contains a Gonkhang, which is dedicated to Mahākāla, and a temple dedicated to Amitāyus, the Buddha of Infinite Life. The ground floor also has a temple dedicated to Avalokiteśvara. The Kunre, the assembly hall for the monks, is located on the upper floor.

2009 earthquake damage

The dzong has suffered serious damage during an earthquake measuring 6.1 on the Richter magnitude scale that hit eastern Bhutan on Monday, 21 September 2009. Many other monasteries in the region also suffered serious damage.

== Other attractions ==
Khoma village, which is an hour walk from the main road to Lhuentse Dzong is famous for its intricate woven cloth made of silk called Kishuthara.

Other well known pilgrimage sites of Padmasambhava i Lhuentse Dzongkhag are Singye Dzong, the beyul Khenpajong (Wylie: mkhan pa ljongs) and Phunying Pass. Singye Dzong was founded by Yeshe Tsogyal and visited by Padmasambhava on his second visit to Bhutan, which is a three-day trek from Khoma.

=== Weaving ===
Weaving is a common handicraft practised in households here and the handlooms produced are very famous. This household industry is dominated by women folk who weave different types of textiles with intricate designs. The unique weaving activities involve embroidery, basket-making and kishuthara (brocade dress). Textile products of Lhuentse are stated to be the best in the country.
