= Trongsa =

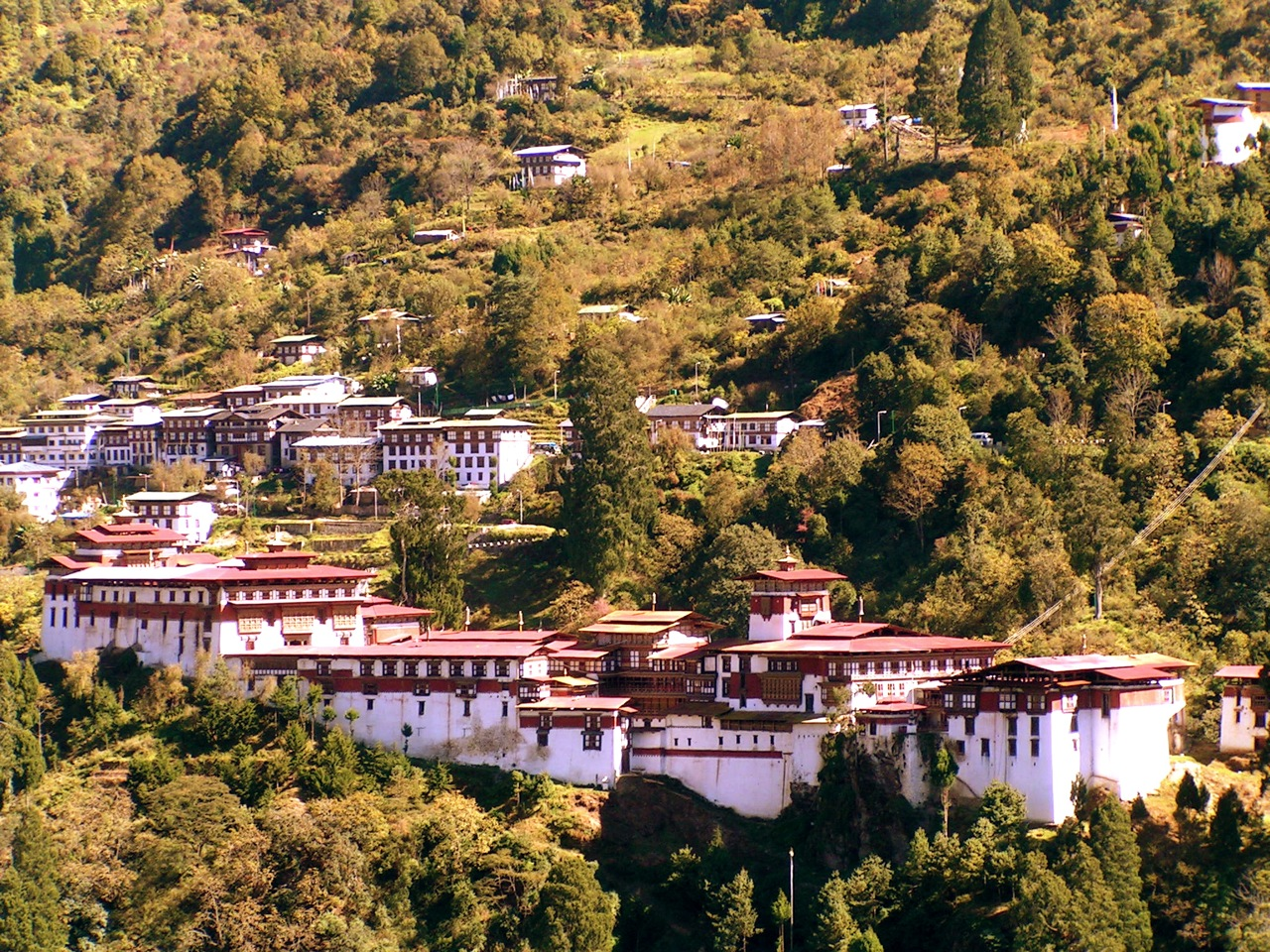
- Trongsa

- Location in Bhutan
- Coordinates: 27°31′N 90°30′E
- Country: Bhutan
- District: Trongsa District
- Time zone: UTC+6 (BTT)

Trongsa, previously Tongsa (Dzongkha: ཀྲོང་གསར་, Wylie: krong gsar), is a Thromde or town, and the capital of Trongsa District in central Bhutan. The name means "new village" in Dzongkha. The first temple was built in 1543 by the Drukpa lama Ngagi Wangchuck, who was the great-grandfather of Ngawang Namgyal, Zhabdrung Rinpoche, the unifier of Bhutan.

== Trongsa Dzong ==
Chökhor Raptentse Dzong at Trongsa which was built in 1644, used to be the seat of power of the Wangchuck dynasty before it became rulers of Bhutan in 1907. Traditionally the King of Bhutan first becomes the Trongsa Penlop (governor) before being named Crown Prince and eventually King. Built on a mountain spur high above the gorges of the Mangde Chhu, the dzong controlled east–west trade for centuries. The only road connecting eastern and western Bhutan (the precursor to the modern Lateral Road), passed through the courtyard of the dzong. At the command of the penlop the massive doors could be shut, dividing the country in two.

Higher yet on the mountainside is a watchtower, called "Ta Dzong"(watch tower), built to guard the dzong from enemies but now housing a museum and a chapel dedicated to Jigme Namgyal who was Trongsa Penlop from 1853 to 1870.

Early establishment of Trongsa Dzong.

As per the prophecy ལུང་བསྟན། of lha dang lama, In 1543 the tutor [yong-zinཡོངས་འཛིན] of kuenkhen Pema karpo ཀུན་མཁྱེན་པདྨ་དཀར་པོ། visited yoelingའོད་གླིང་། village to the north བྱང་ཕྱོགས། of current day Trongsa dzong, where yoeling temple ལྷ་ཁང་།ོ is located. In his clear spiritual vision, he saw a sparkling light emerging at night from a cliff in the middle of a forest. Later that day, when he went to the site, he saw the bagha བྷ་ག of dorji phamo and the soul lake བླ་མཚོ། of pelden Lhamo དཔལ་ལྡན་ལྷ་མོ།[Mahakali] as well as the footprints of her riding horse འཆིབ་རྟ along the waist of the cliff. Yongzin Rinpoche then built a hermitage at the particular site and meditated in the area, where he saw Pelden Lhamo in person. In that event, he realized it to be a prophecy for the place to have a Majestic Dzong, from which the reign of the Pelden Drukpa would flourish as the rays of the Sun.

The valley of Trongsa also known as Mang-Dey.

Trongsa is also known as Mang-deg which later became Mang-dey, with a change in the spelling and pronunciation of the second word. The history behind who, why and when the name was given runs back to the time when Buddhist scholar Kuenkhen Longchen Rabjam visited Trongsa around 1357 and conferred kachoe བཀའ་ཆོས། spiritual teaching at the place called Sherabling. During that time the people of Trongsa [devotees] offered plenty of druna འབྲུ་སྣ། [grain] as offering. In an enchanting way, Kuenkhen Rinpoche said, "since you all offered me plenty of grain, the place will be called 'Mang-Deg'" མང་སྡེག- mang meaning plenty and deg meaning offered. Thus the name of the place was derived from Kuenkhen Rinpoche's statement, and was known as Mang-deg, which later changed to mag-dey as mentioned before, with the change of time.

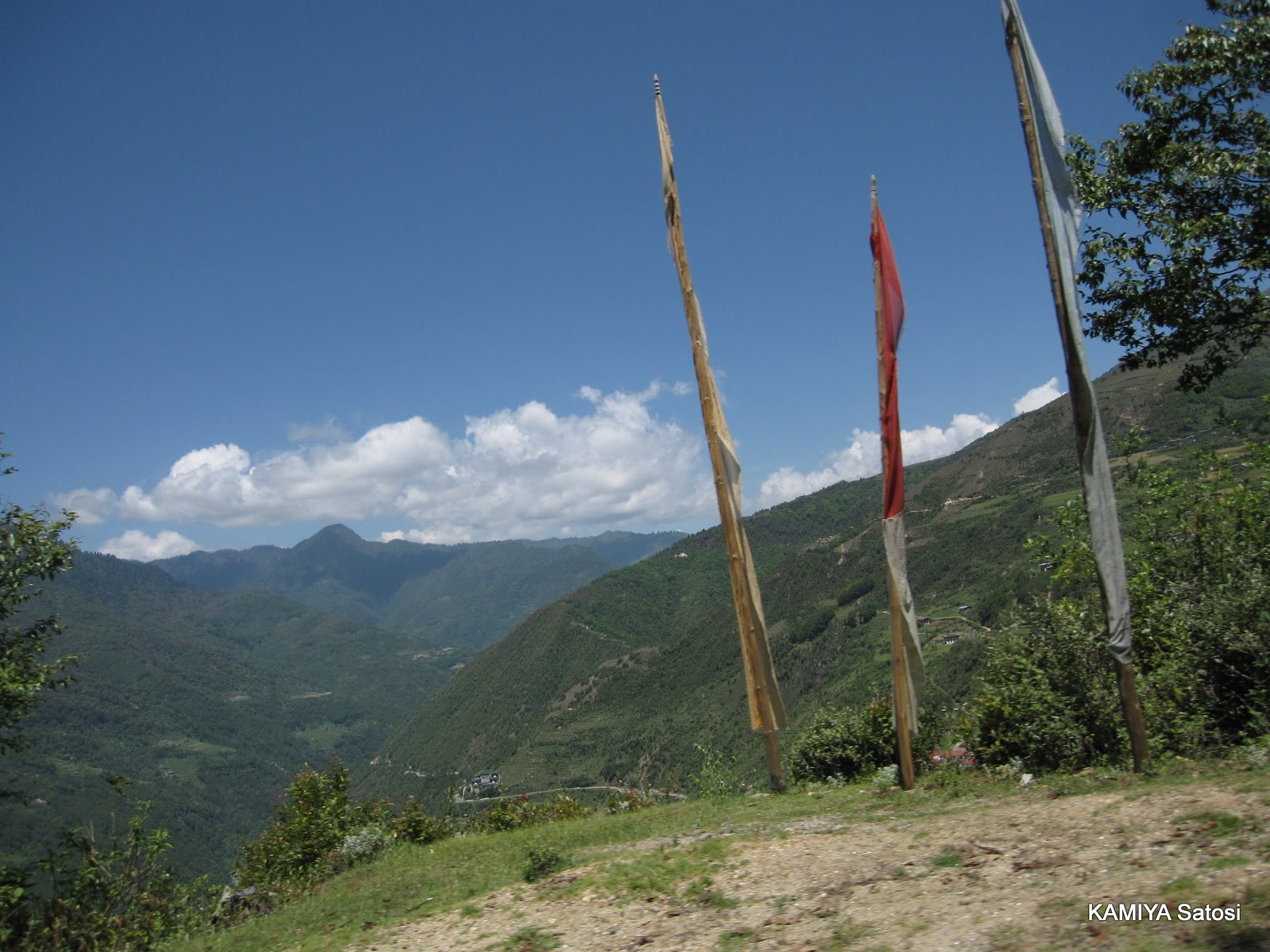
Highway to Sarpang just east of the town

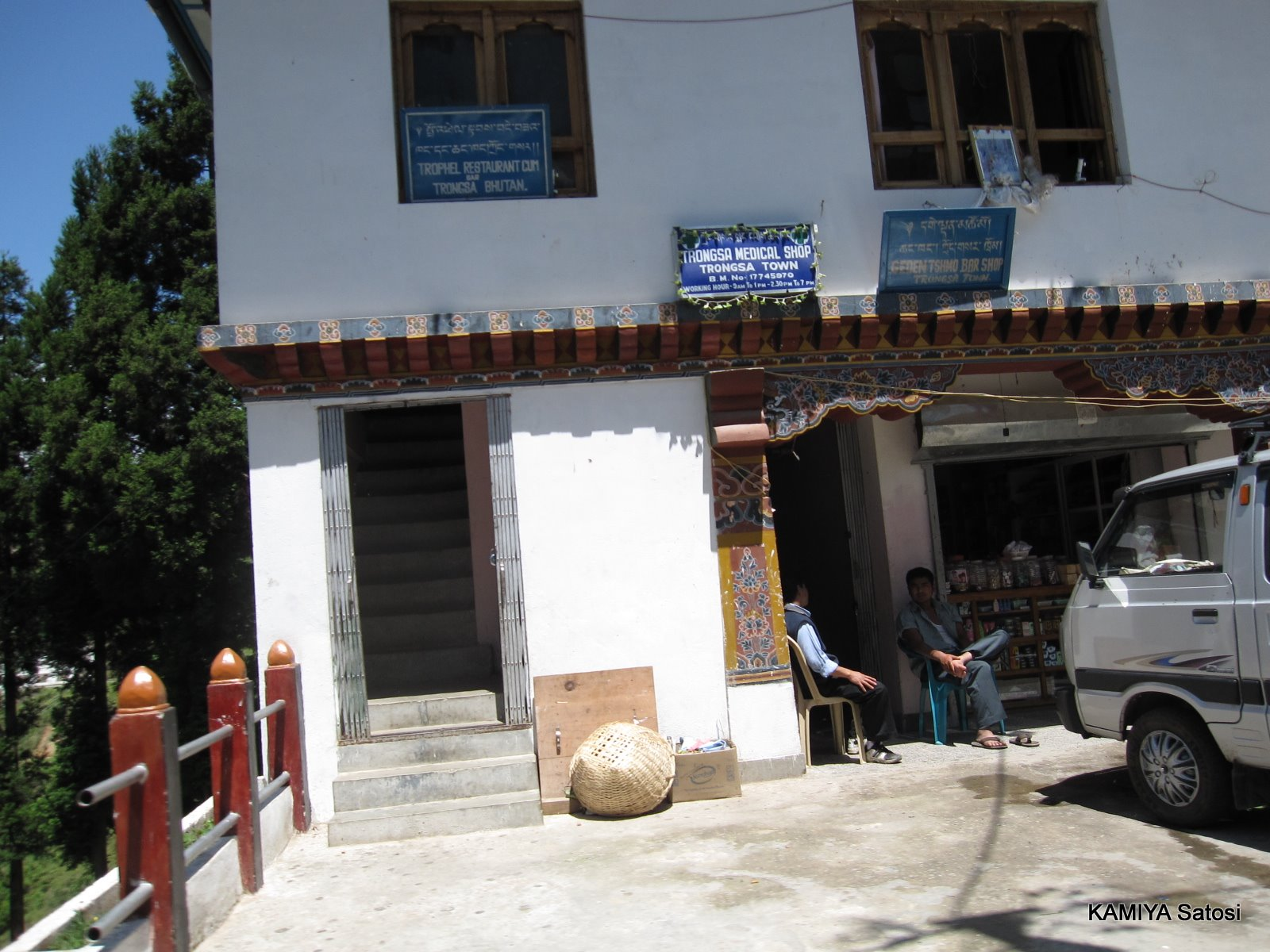
Trongsa town medical centre

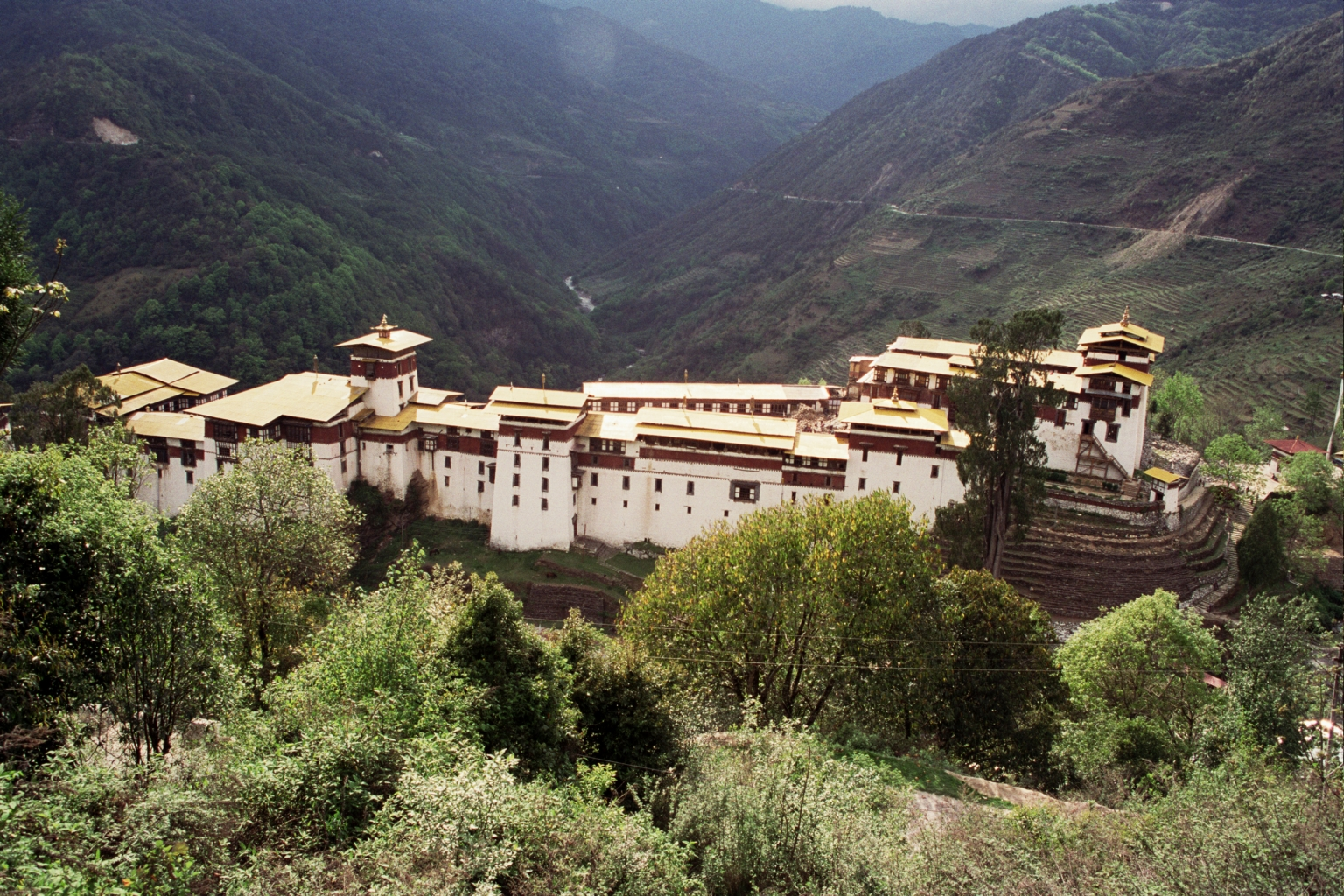
Trongsa Dzong from above to the west of the town

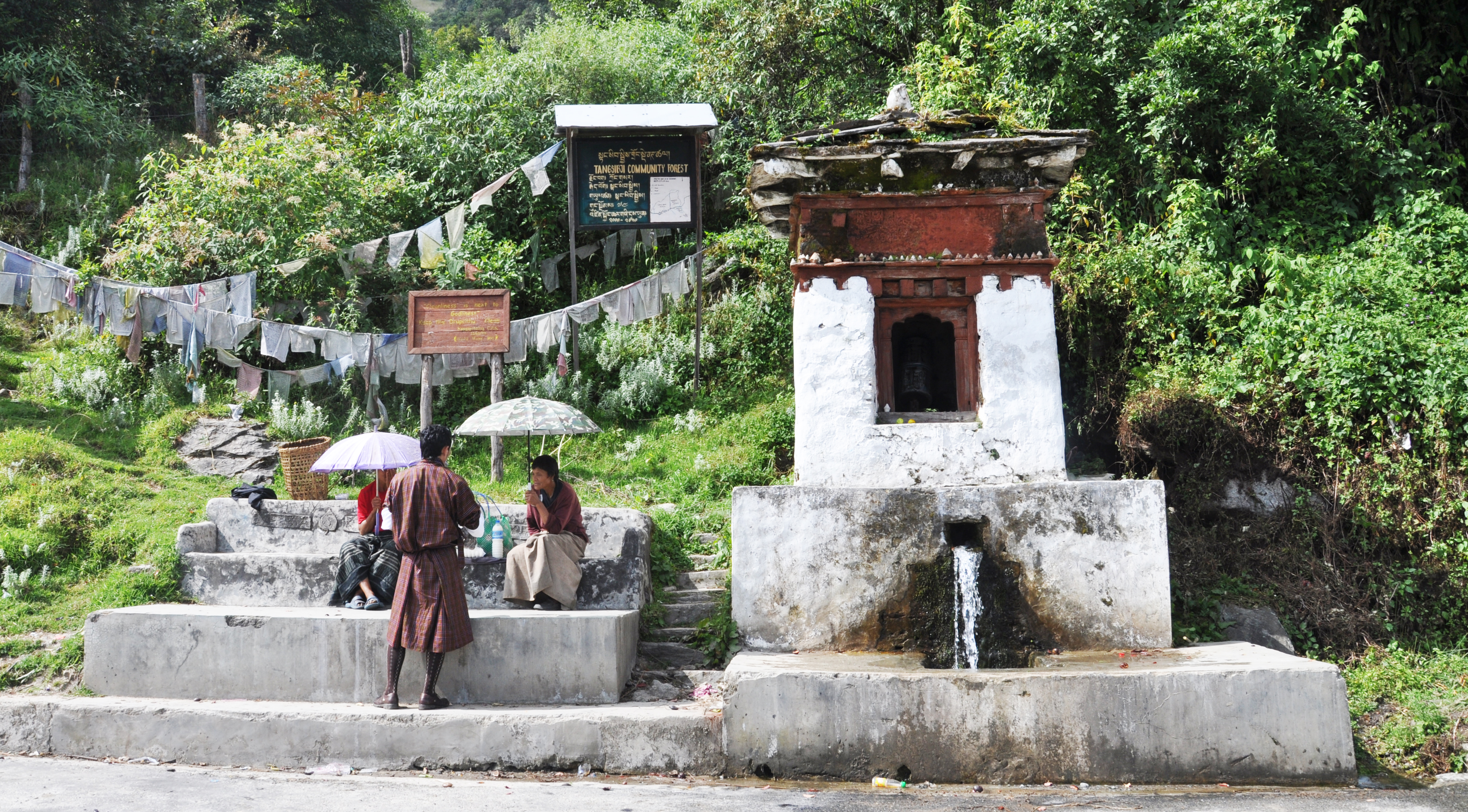
Holy water spring -Trongsa- Bhutan

== Climate ==
Climate data for Trongsa, elevation 2,120 m (6,960 ft), (1996–2017 normals, extremes 2003–2017)
Month	Jan	Feb	Mar	Apr	May	Jun	Jul	Aug	Sep	Oct	Nov	Dec	Year
Record high °C (°F)	21.5 (70.7)	22.0 (71.6)	28.0 (82.4)	27.0 (80.6)	28.0 (82.4)	31.0 (87.8)	31.0 (87.8)	31.0 (87.8)	30.0 (86.0)	28.0 (82.4)	24.0 (75.2)	23.0 (73.4)	31.0 (87.8)
Mean daily maximum °C (°F)	15.2 (59.4)	16.9 (62.4)	19.7 (67.5)	21.4 (70.5)	22.3 (72.1)	23.4 (74.1)	24.1 (75.4)	24.7 (76.5)	23.7 (74.7)	21.6 (70.9)	18.6 (65.5)	16.5 (61.7)	20.7 (69.2)
Daily mean °C (°F)	9.3 (48.7)	10.9 (51.6)	14.0 (57.2)	16.3 (61.3)	17.7 (63.9)	19.8 (67.6)	20.6 (69.1)	20.8 (69.4)	19.8 (67.6)	16.7 (62.1)	13.1 (55.6)	10.8 (51.4)	15.8 (60.5)
Mean daily minimum °C (°F)	3.4 (38.1)	4.8 (40.6)	8.2 (46.8)	11.2 (52.2)	13.0 (55.4)	16.1 (61.0)	17.1 (62.8)	16.9 (62.4)	15.8 (60.4)	11.7 (53.1)	7.6 (45.7)	5.0 (41.0)	10.9 (51.6)
Record low °C (°F)	−4.0 (24.8)	−3.0 (26.6)	0.5 (32.9)	3.0 (37.4)	6.0 (42.8)	9.0 (48.2)	11.0 (51.8)	11.5 (52.7)	9.0 (48.2)	3.5 (38.3)	0.5 (32.9)	−2.5 (27.5)	−4.0 (24.8)
Average rainfall mm (inches)	9.5 (0.37)	15.3 (0.60)	52.2 (2.06)	104.8 (4.13)	152.3 (6.00)	194.9 (7.67)	257.6 (10.14)	235.6 (9.28)	151.7 (5.97)	73.9 (2.91)	11.9 (0.47)	6.5 (0.26)	1,266.2 (49.86)
Average relative humidity (%)	76.5	76.9	76.9	78.7	80.8	86.1	86.0	84.5	86.2	81.5	77.2	76.8	80.7
Source: National Center for Hydrology and Meteorology

== See also ==
- Trongsa Dzong
- Penlop of Trongsa
- Trongsa Province
- Bhutan Cultural Atlas
- Tshangkha Shaydra.
