= Zhongar Dzong =

Coordinates: 27.2936°N 91.1337°E

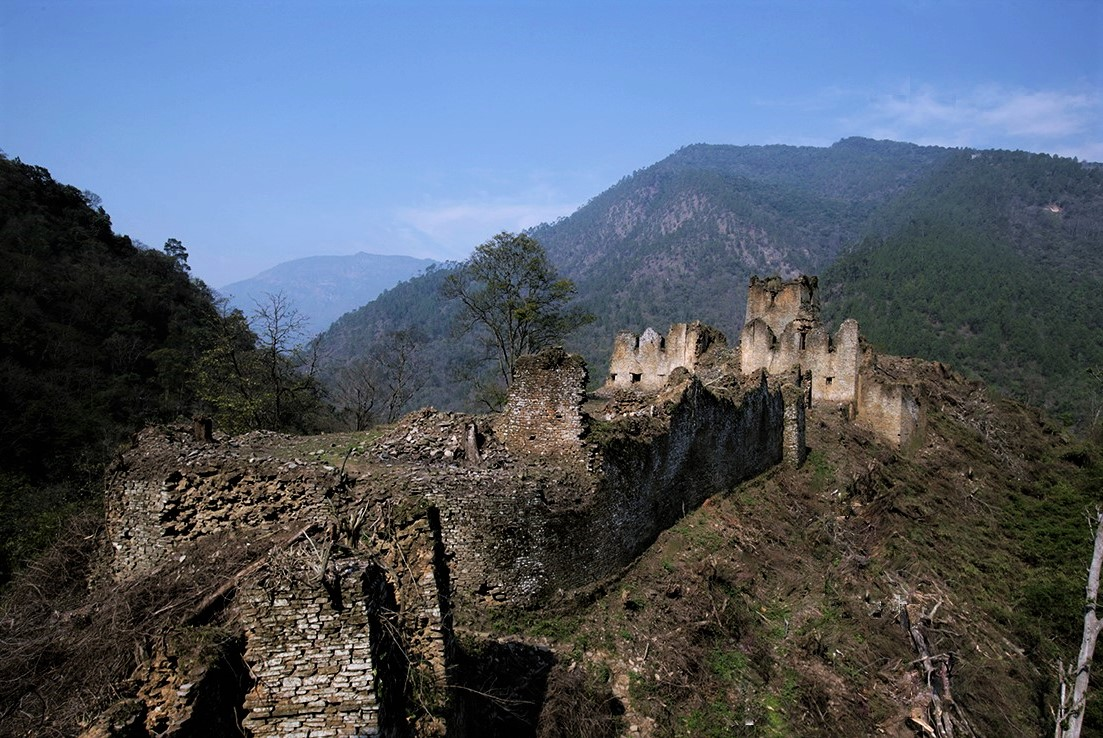
- Interactive map of Zhongar Dzong
- Country: Bhutan
- District: Mongar District
- Structure: Dzong
- Established: 17th Century

Zhongar Dzong is a large medieval ruin overlooking the valley between Lingmethang Town and Thidangbi Village in the Mongar District of Eastern Bhutan. Constructed in the 17th century from white stone mined from the nearby Kuri Chhu river, it once stretched over 4 acres of land and was one of the largest fortresses in the country. Because of its size and construction material, the dzong came to be known as Zhongkar "white bowl" (zhong-bowl, kar-white).

In the late 18th century, the dzong was damaged by a disastrous fire, and then further destroyed by a large earthquake.
