= Gyalpozhing =

- Location in Bhutan
- Coordinates: 27°11′N 91°10′E
- Country: Bhutan
- District: Mongar District

Population (2005)
  - Total: 2,291
- Time zone: UTC+6 (BTT)

Gyalpozhing or Gyelpozhing is a town in Mongar District in southeastern-central Bhutan. It is located to the west of Mongar and east of Lingmethang.

It is located on the base of Kuri Chhu.

Its population was 2,291 at the 2005 census.
