= Mountain Hazelnuts =

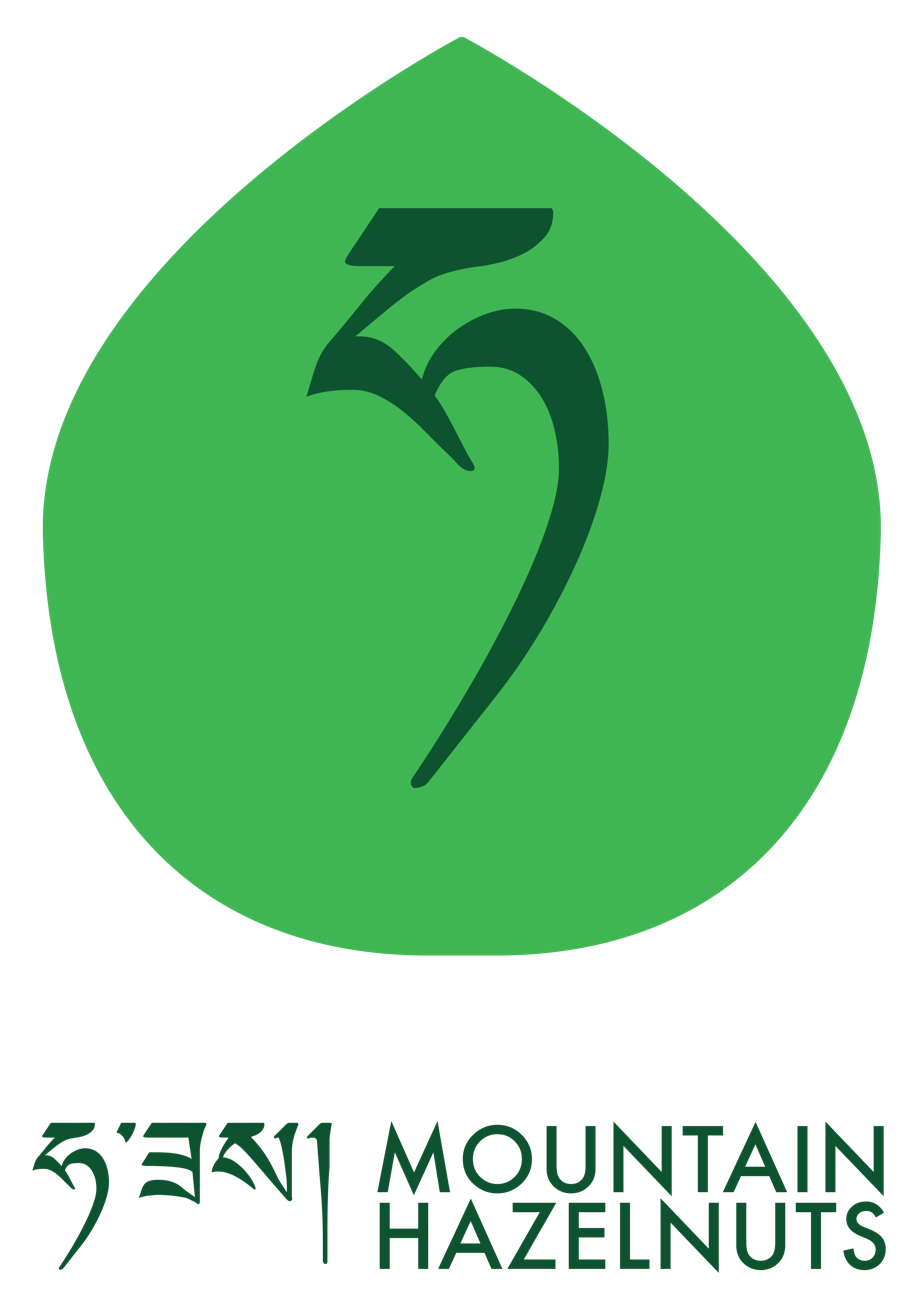
- Industry: Agroforestry; Agribusiness; Sustainable Agriculture
- Founded: 2009
- Founder: Daniel Spitzer; Teresa Law
- Headquarters: Lingmethang; Thimphu, Bhutan
- Products: Hazelnuts
- Website: MountainHazelnuts.com

Mountain Hazelnuts ('MH') is a social enterprise partnering with over 12,000 farmer households and community groups to plant 10 million hazelnut trees across the Himalayan Kingdom of Bhutan. MH is Bhutan's largest private sector employer, and endeavors to create shared value for rural mountain communities, shareholders, and the natural environment.

According to a May 2010 article in Forbes, the Company "represents the first major foreign direct investment in Bhutan’s history."

The Company provides young hazelnut trees, inputs, and technical assistance to rural smallholder farmers. Once the trees mature, the Company purchases hazelnuts harvested from their partner growers, which are then processed for export to premium international markets.

== Partners ==
In 2015, the International Finance Corporation (IFC), Asian Development Bank (ADB), and The Global Agriculture and Food Security Program (GAFSP) joined the venture to offer a blended financing package – combining equity and non-traditional debt.

In 2018, MH secured US$3 million in debt financing from Ceniarth.

In 2019, MH secured a US$9 million long-term financing agreement with the United Nations-affiliated Land Degradation Neutrality Fund (LDN), managed by Mirova/Natixis.
