= Bhutanese wine =

Wine making in Bhutan

The production of wine in Bhutan is reported to have first been attempted in the 1990s, with the introduction of an experimental vineyard at Paro (2,300 metres (7,500 ft)) near Thimphu, the capital of Bhutan. Australian wine company, Taltarni, is believed to have provided technical help, but it is not known whether any wine was successfully produced.

== Timeline ==
On April 2, 2019, the US-based Bhutan Wine Company, in partnership with Bhutanese collaborators, planted the first fine wine vineyard in Bhutan: the Yusipang Vineyard. The first vine in the ground was Merlot.

On April 4, 2019, the Bhutan Wine Company planted a second small vineyard: the Bajo Vineyard. Varietals included Merlot, Cabernet, Cabernet Franc, Syrah, Pinot Noir, Chardonnay, Sauvignon Blanc, Malbec, and Petit Manseng. All vines came from Sunridge Nurseries in California.

April 8–10, 2019, the Bhutan Wine Company planted the Kingdom's third and fourth vineyards in Paro and Lingmethang.

As of May 11, 2019, an additional 2 acres had been cleared and planted at these initial vineyard sites.

As of May 2025, there are currently nine vineyards comprising 200 acres in Bhutan, at altitudes ranging from 500 feet to over 9000 feet. Black varieties planted are Cabernet Sauvignon, Cabernet Franc, Syrah, Malbec, Merlot, Pinot Noir, Sangiovese, Grenache and Tempranillo. White varieties planted are Chardonnay, Sauvignon Blanc, Chenin Blanc, Riesling, Petit Manseng, Vidal and Traminette.

In April 2025, the auction house Bonhams hosted the sale of the historic First Barrel bottles, including some special large format bottles. The flagship lot was a special Himalayan 7.57 liter bottle, specially commemorated to honor Gangkhar Puensum, which is the highest unclimbed mountain in the world, located in Bhutan and is 7,570 meters tall. The Himalayan bottle sold for a record $18,750.

== See also ==
- Agriculture in Bhutan
- Winemaking
