= Lingmethang =

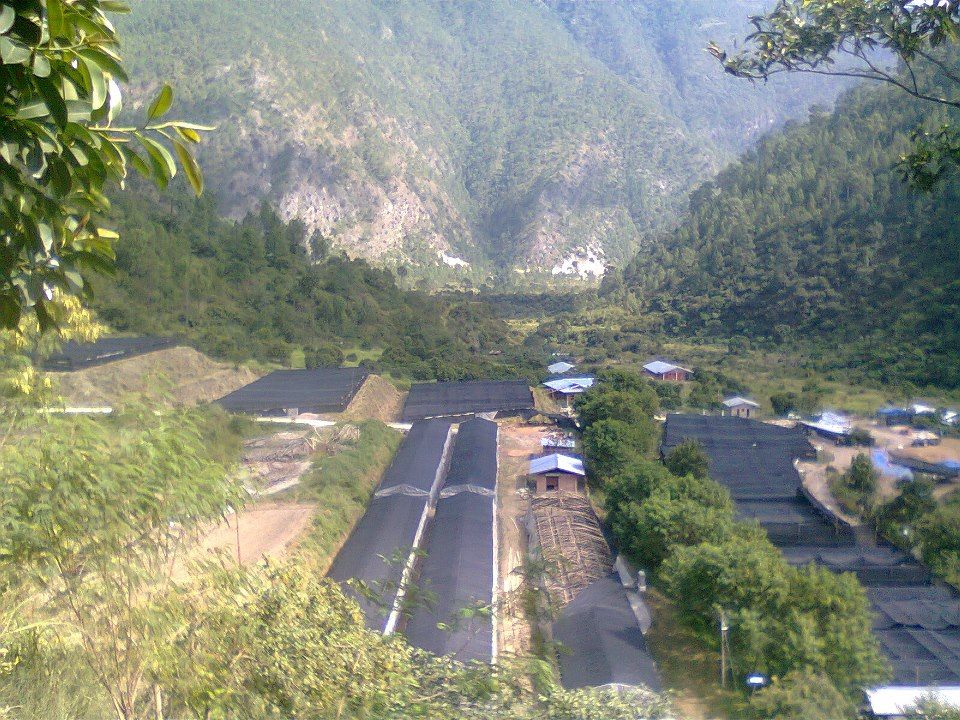

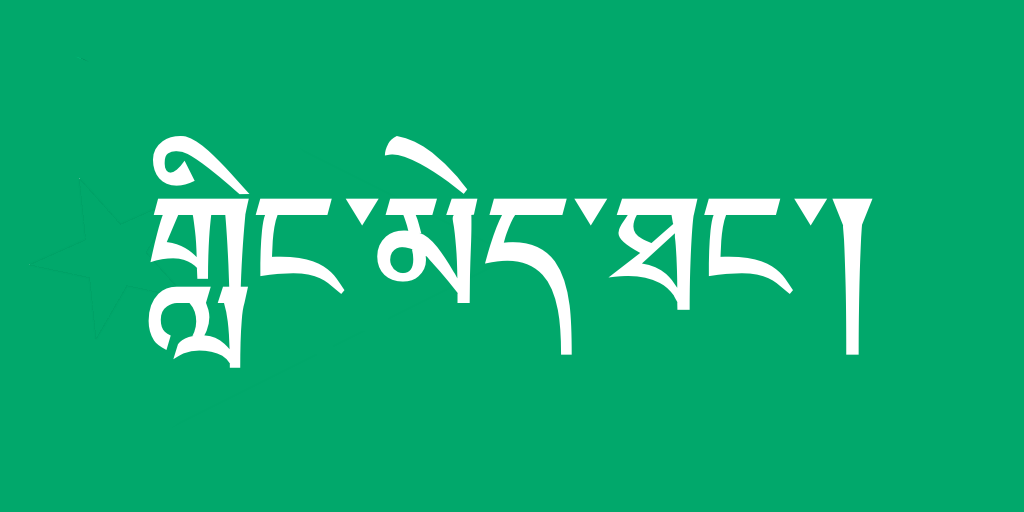
- Flag

- Location in Bhutan
- Coordinates: 27°15′37″N 91°10′35″E
- Country: Bhutan
- District: Mongar District

Area
  - Total: 32 ha (80 acres)
- Highest elevation: 660 m (2,170 ft)
- Lowest elevation: 620 m (2,030 ft)

Lingmethang is a small town under Salling Geog in Mongar district, in the eastern part of Bhutan. It is located off of the Thimphu-Trashigang highway, to the west of Mongar City and, 7 km north of the town of Gyalpozhing. The town lies in a lush valley just west of the Kuri Chhu river, covering approximately 80 acres at an average elevation of 650 m. The population is approximately 1,190 people.

Lingmethang has the local Leadership office including the office of the Saling Gup, a Basic Health Unit established by the Ministry of Health, Lingmethang Primary School established by the Ministry of Education, Agriculture, Livestock and Forestry Extension Service Centre, Agriculture Research & Development Sub-Centre, and Regional Pig & Poultry Breeding Centre established by the Ministry of Agriculture & Forests, Bhutan Agro Industries Ltd., Department of Road Regional Office and Regional Office of Construction Development Company Ltd. established under the Ministry of Works and Human Settlements.

- In 2010, the Early Learning Centre in Lingmethang opened
- In 2013, a local farmers market established
- In 2017, the Bhutan National Bank opened a branch office providing customer service

Zhongar Dzong overlooks the valley between Lingmethang Town and Thidangbi Village in Mongar District.
