= Yagang Lhakhang =

Temple in Bhutan

Coordinates: 27.2640°N 91.2292°E

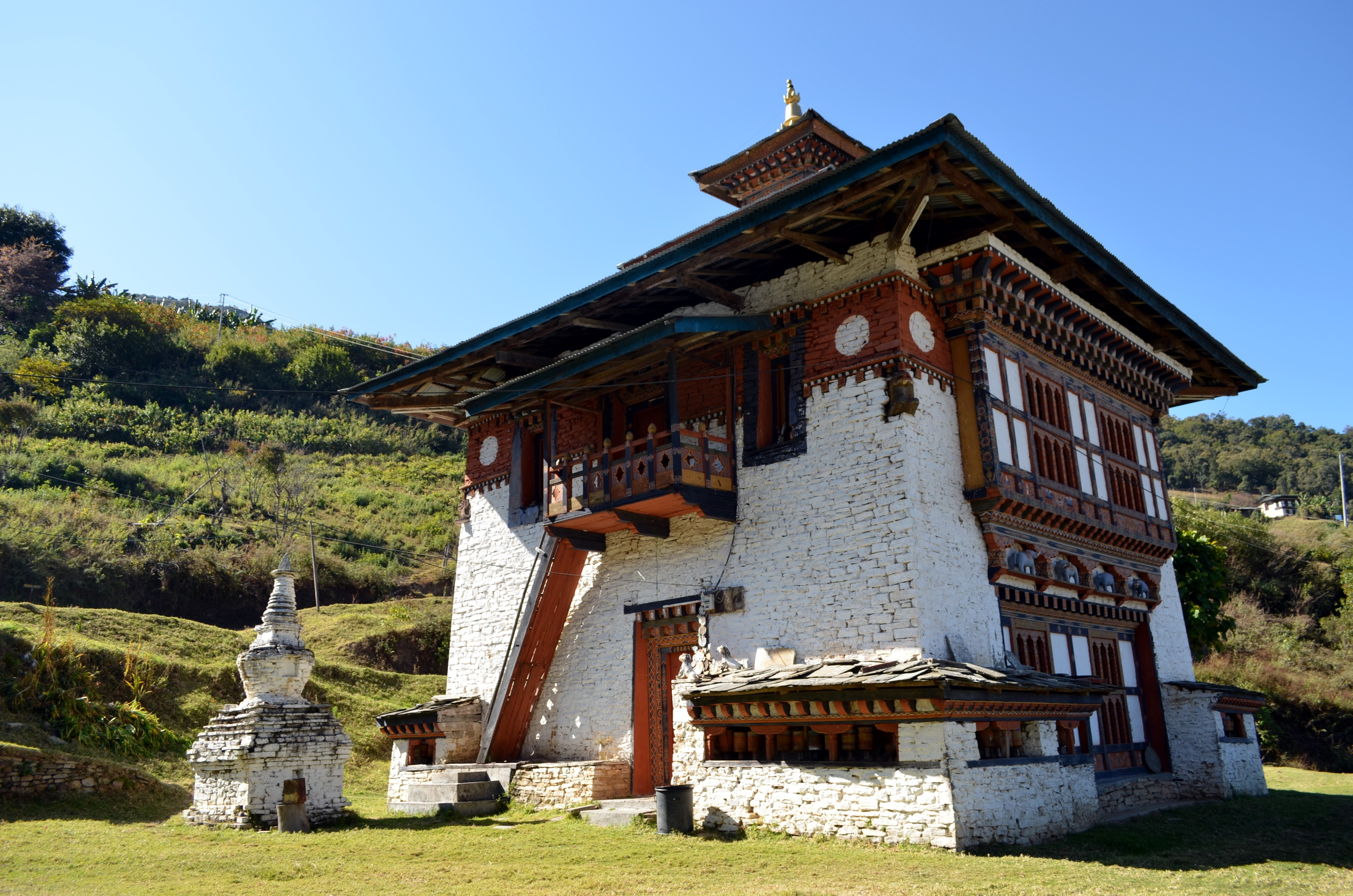
Yagang Lhakhang

The Yagang Lhakhang is a Buddhist temple, located in a village on the outskirts of Mongar in eastern Bhutan. It was built in the 16th century by Sangdag, the youngest son of Pema Lingpa, a famous tertön.

The temple is known for its collection of religious treasures, masks, musical instruments, armour, ancient weapons, and xylograph blocks used for printing prayer flags and texts. The religious treasures include a statue of Gautama Buddha discovered by Pema Lingpa in Mebartso, Bumthang and a kīla made by Pema Lingpa himself. At this Lhakhang an annual three-day tshechu or ritual and Cham dance festival is held on the 8th, 9th and 10th of the fifth month of the Bhutanese lunar calendar. This festival is one of the oldest held in eastern Bhutan.
