= Chogyal Minjur Tempa =

Bhutanese king (1613–1680)

Druk Desi
- In office 1667–1680
- Nominated by: Ngawang Namgyal, the 1st Zhabdrung Rinpoche
- Preceded by: La Ngyenpa Tenzin Drukdra
- Succeeded by: Gyalsey Tenzin Rabgye

Trongsa Penlop
- In office 1647–?

Personal details
- Born: Damchho Lhendrub; 1613 Min-Chhud, Tibet
- Died: 1680 (aged 66–67)

The Third Desi Chogyal Minjur Tempa (Dzongkha: སྡེ་སྲིད་ཁྲི་རབས་གསུམ་པ་ཆོས་རྒྱ་མི་འགྱུར་བསྟན་པ born Damchho Lhendrub in 1613) was the third Druk Desi, the secular head of Bhutan, and previously the first penlop (governor) of Trongsa (Trongsab). His tenure as penlop was notable for the building of a watchtower and the unification of eight Eastern Districts into the Sharchog Khorlo Tsibgye.

== Background ==
Chogyal Minjur Tempa was born in 1613 in Min-Chhud, Tibet, as Damchho Lhendrub. He became a monk at an early age. He was appointed as Umzey (Chant Master) before he was appointed as the first Penlop of Trongsa by Ngawang Namgyal in 1647. As a Penlop of Trongsa, he was sent to Sharchog Khorlo Tsibgye to fight against the lords of Eastern Bhutan, which he was successful. He built many dzongs of Lhuentse, Trashigang, Jakar, and Zhemgang, and built Ta Dzong in Trongsa. Later in the year 1667, he was appointed as the 3rd Druk Desi by Ngawang Namgyal.
