= Penlop of Trongsa =

Bhutanese royal title

Incumbent
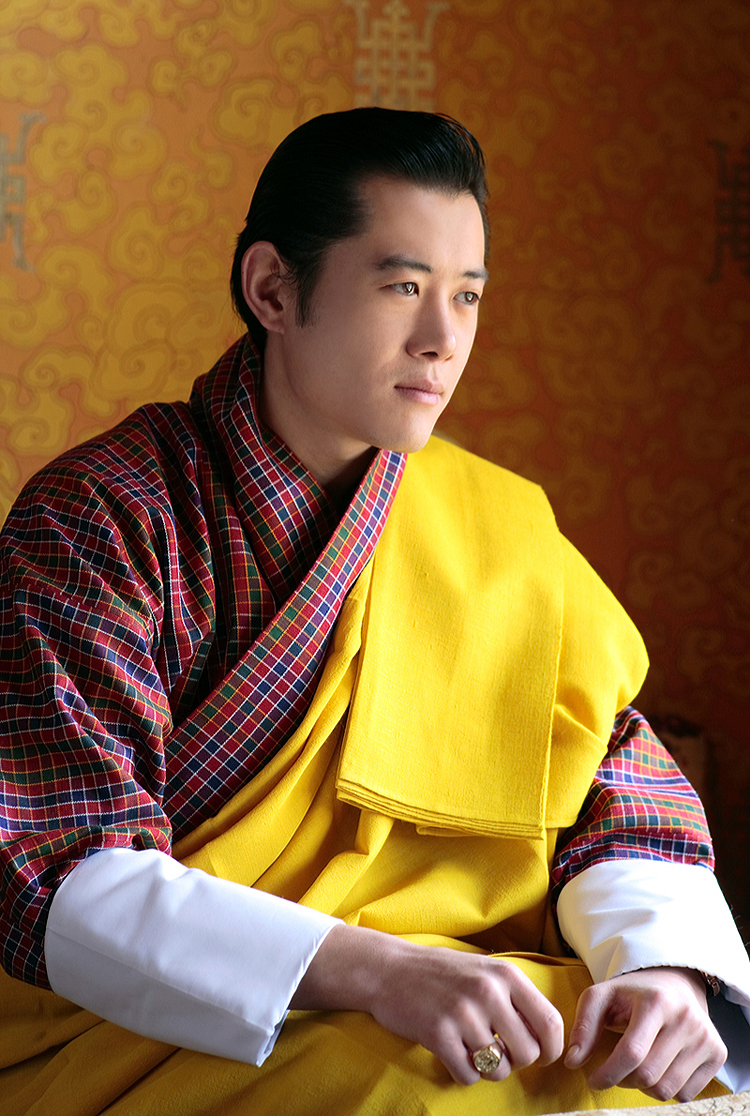
- Jigme Khesar Namgyel Wangchuck
- Since 31 October 2004

Details
- Style: His Highness
- First monarch: Chogyal Minjur Tempa
- Formed: 1647

The Penlop of Trongsa (Dzongkha: ཀྲོང་གསར་དཔོན་སློབ་; Wylie: Krong-gsar dpon-slob), also called Chhoetse Penlop (Dzongkha: ཆོས་རྩེ་དཔོན་སློབ་; Wylie: Chos-rtse dpon-slob; also spelled "Chötse"), (Note: The spelling of this title varies widely in sources because transliterations of Tibetan script and transcriptions of Tibetan phonology differ. Penlop may be spelled "pönlop" or "ponlop". Trongsa may appear as "Tongsa" or even "(b)Krongsa". Chotse may alternatively appear as "Chhotse", "Ch(h)oetse" or "Ch(h)ötse". Any combination of these variations may also contain additional hyphens or differing capitalization.) is a Dzongkha title meaning "Governor of the Province of Trongsa (Chhoetse)". It is now generally given to the heir apparent of the Kingdom of Bhutan, but historically was an important title, for the governor of Trongsa and the surrounding area, and was the route by which the House of Wangchuck came to the throne.

The most recent holder of the title was King Jigme Khesar Namgyel Wangchuck, who was then a prince (Dzongkha: dasho, gyalsey). The current heir apparent is Prince Jigme Namgyel Wangchuck, because the title is reserved for the officially designated heir apparent, and is subject to change by the reigning king. Also, the reigning Druk Gyalpo may retain the office or award it to another person after coronation. The proper reference style is His Royal Highness Trongsa (Chhoetse) Penlop.

Penlop is a title roughly translating to "Provincial Governor" or the European title "Duke". The crown prince holds the title "Penlop of Trongsa", or "Trongsa Penlop", which is the title held by the House of Wangchuck before its ascendancy to the throne. Originally, there were Penlops for each of the nine provinces of Bhutan, but they were consolidated under the control of the 12th Penlop of Trongsa Ugyen Wangchuck when he became the first Druk Gyalpo.

== History ==
Trongsa Penlops
| Number | Name | Dates |
|---|---|---|
| 1 | Tongsab Chogyal Minjur Tenpa | 1646–?? |
| 2 | Tongsab Sherub Lhendup (Namlungpa) | (fl. 1667) |
| 3 | Tongsab Zhidhar (Druk Dhendup) | (fl. 1715) |
| 4 | Tongsab Dorji Namgyel (Druk Phuntsho) (Note: Dorji Namgyel was also the 14th Druk Desi 1763–1765) | ? |
| 5 | Tongsab Sonam Drugyel (Pekar) (Note: Sonam Drugyel was also the 31th Druk Desi 1815–1819) | (fl. 1770) |
| 6 | Tongsab Jangchhub Gyeltshen | ? |
| 7 | Tongsab Konchhog Tenzin | ? |
| 8 | Tongsab Ugyen Phuntsho | ? |
| 9 | Tongsab Tshoki Dorji | ?–1853 |
| 10 | Tongsab Samdrup Jigme Namgyal (Note: Jigme Namgyal was also the 51st Druk Desi (Deb Raja) of Bhutan 1870–1873) | 1853–1870 |
| 11 | Tongsab Dungkar Gyeltshen (Note: Paternal grandfather of First Queen Tsundue Pema Lhamo) | 1870–1882 |
| 12 | Gongsar Ugyen Wangchuck | 1882–1907 |
| 13 | Gyalsey Jigme Wangchuck | 1923–?? |
| 14 | Gyalsey Jigme Dorji Wangchuck | 1946–?? |
| 15 | Gyalsey Jigme Singye Wangchuck | 1972–?? |
| 16 | Gyalsey Jigme Khesar Namgyel Wangchuck | 2004–present |
Notes:

Under Bhutan's early theocratic dual system of government, decreasingly effective central government control resulted in the de facto disintegration of the office of Zhabdrung Rinpoche after the death of Ngawang Namgyal in 1651. Under this system, the Zhabdrung reigned over the temporal Druk Desi and religious Je Khenpo. Two successor Zhabdrungs – the son (1651) and stepbrother (1680) of Ngawang Namgyal – were effectively controlled by the Druk Desi and Je Khenpo until power was further splintered through the innovation of multiple Zhabdrung incarnations, reflecting speech, mind, and body. Increasingly secular regional lords (penlops and dzongpens) competed for power amid a backdrop of civil war over the Zhabdrung and invasions from Tibet and the Mongol Empire.

The penlops of Trongsa and Paro, and the dzongpens of Punakha, Thimphu, and Wangdue Phodrang were particularly notable figures in the competition for regional dominance. During this period, there were a total of nine provinces and eight penlops vying for power.

Chogyal Minjur Tenpa (1613–1680; r. 1667–1680) was the first Penlop of Trongsa, appointed by Ngawang Namgyal. He was born Damchho Lhundrub in Min-Chhud, Tibet, and led a monastic life from childhood. Before his appointment at Trongsa, he held the appointed post of Umzey (Chant Master). A trusted follower of the Zhabdrung, Minjur Tenpa was sent to subdue kings of Bumthang, Lhuntse, Trashigang, Zhemgang, and other lords from Trongsa Dzong. After doing so, the Tongsa divided his control in the east among eight regions (Shachho Khorlo Tsegay), overseen by Dungpas and Kutshabs (civil servants). He went on to build Jakar, Lhuntse, Trashigang, and Zhemgang Dzongs.

Within this political landscape, the House of Wangchuck originated in the Bumthang region of central Bhutan. The family belongs to the descendants of Dungkar Choji of the Nyö clan, and is descended from Pema Lingpa, a Bhutanese Nyingma saint. The Nyö clan emerged as a local aristocracy supplanting many older aristocratic families of Tibetan origin that sided with Tibet during invasions of Bhutan. In doing so, the clan came to occupy the de facto hereditary position of Penlop of Trongsa since Jigme Namgyal (appointed from among his family), as well as significant national and local government positions.

While the Penlop of Trongsa controlled central and eastern Bhutan, the rival Penlop of Paro controlled western Bhutan. Dzongpens controlled areas surrounding their respective dzongs. Eastern dzongpens were generally under the control of the Penlop of Trongsa, who was officially endowed with the power to appoint them in 1853. The Penlop of Paro, unlike Trongsa, was an office appointed by the Druk Desi's central govertunment. Because western regions controlled by the Penlop of Paro contained lucrative trade routes, it became the object of competition among aristocratic families.

Although Bhutan generally enjoyed favorable relations with both Tibet and the British Raj through the 19th century, extension of British power at Bhutan's borders as well as Tibetan incursions in British Sikkim defined politically opposed pro-Tibet and pro-Britain forces. This period of intense rivalry between and within western and central Bhutan, coupled with external forces from Tibet and especially the British Empire, provided the conditions for the ascendancy of the Penlop of Trongsa.

After the Bhutan War with Britain (1864–65) as well as substantial territorial losses (Cooch Behar 1835; Assam Dooars 1841), armed conflict turned inward. In 1870, amid the continuing civil wars, Penlop Jigme Namgyal of Trongsa ascended to the office of Druk Desi. In 1879, he appointed his 17-year-old son Ugyen Wangchuck as Penlop of Paro. Jigme Namgyal reigned through his death 1881, punctuated by periods of retirement during which he retained effective control of the country.

The pro-Britain Penlop Ugyen Wangchuck ultimately prevailed against the pro-Tibet and anti-Britain Penlop of Paro after a series of civil wars and rebellions between 1882 and 1885. After his father's death in 1881, Ugyen Wangchuck entered a feud over the post of Penlop of Trongsa. In 1882, at the age of 20, he marched on Bumthang and Trongsa, winning the post of Penlop of Trongsa in addition to Paro. In 1885, Ugyen Wangchuck intervened in a conflict between the Dzongpens of Punakha and Thimphu, sacking both sides and seizing Simtokha Dzong. From this time forward, the office of Druk Desi became purely ceremonial.

== Legal status ==
Under Article 2 of the Constitution of Bhutan, actual succession depends on the King without regard to who is the titular Trongsa or Chhoetse Penlop: the title is not a part of the Constitutional succession framework. Thus, if there are "shortcomings in the elder prince, it is the sacred duty of the King to select and proclaim the most capable prince or princess as heir to the Throne."

== See also ==
- Penlop
- Druk Gyalpo
- List of rulers of Bhutan
- House of Wangchuck
