= Bhutan Cultural Atlas =

The Bhutan Cultural Atlas (འབྲུག་གི་ལམ་སྲོལ་ས་ཁྲ།) is a web based cultural mapping initiative sponsored by the Royal University of Bhutan - College of Language and Culture Studies, the UNESCO World Heritage Centre and the Oriental Cultural Heritage Sites Protection Alliance (OCHSPA, France), aimed at helping to preserve Bhutan's intangible and tangible cultural assets.
