= Mongar =

Place in Mongar District, Bhutan

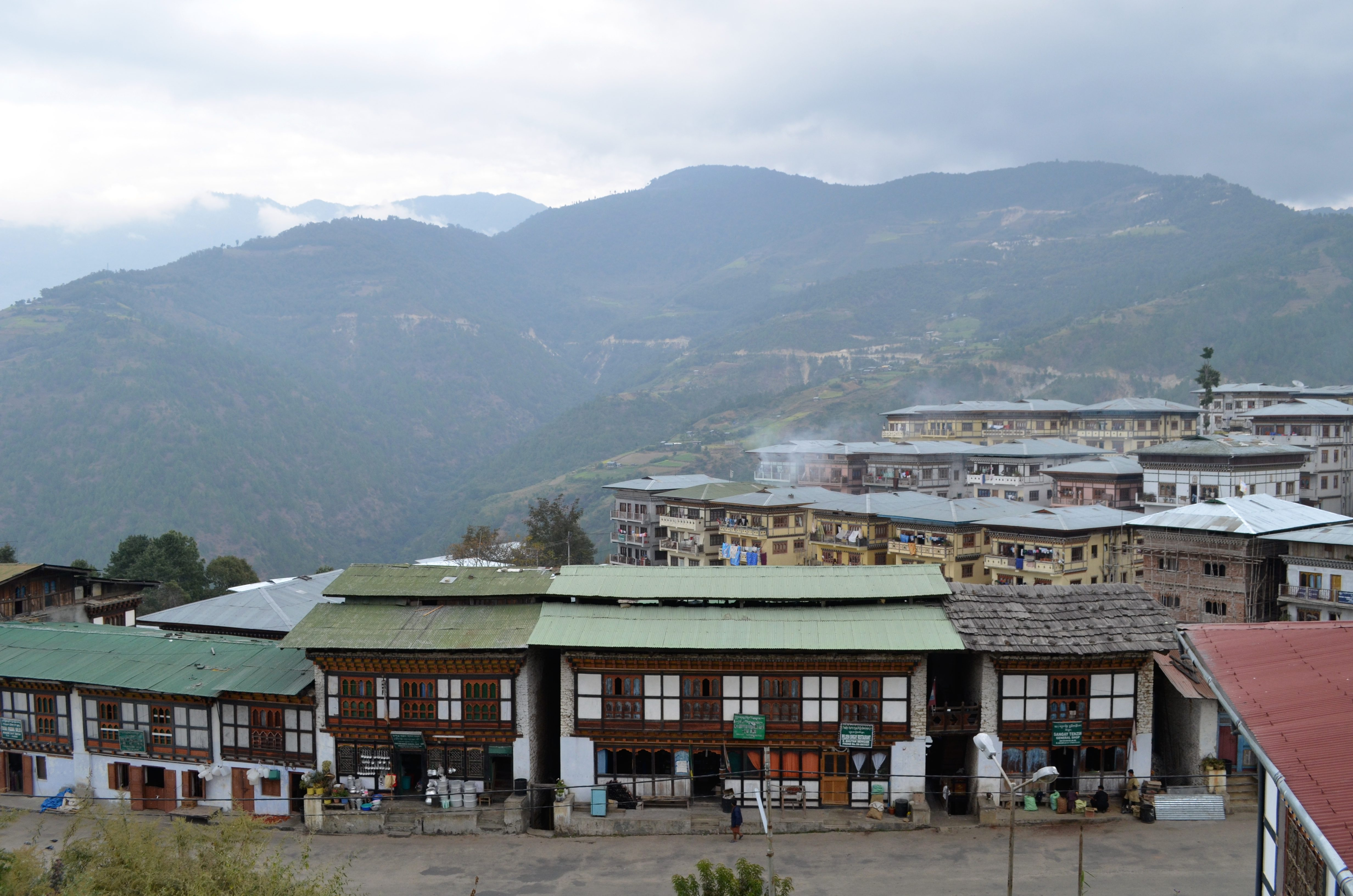
View of Mongar town

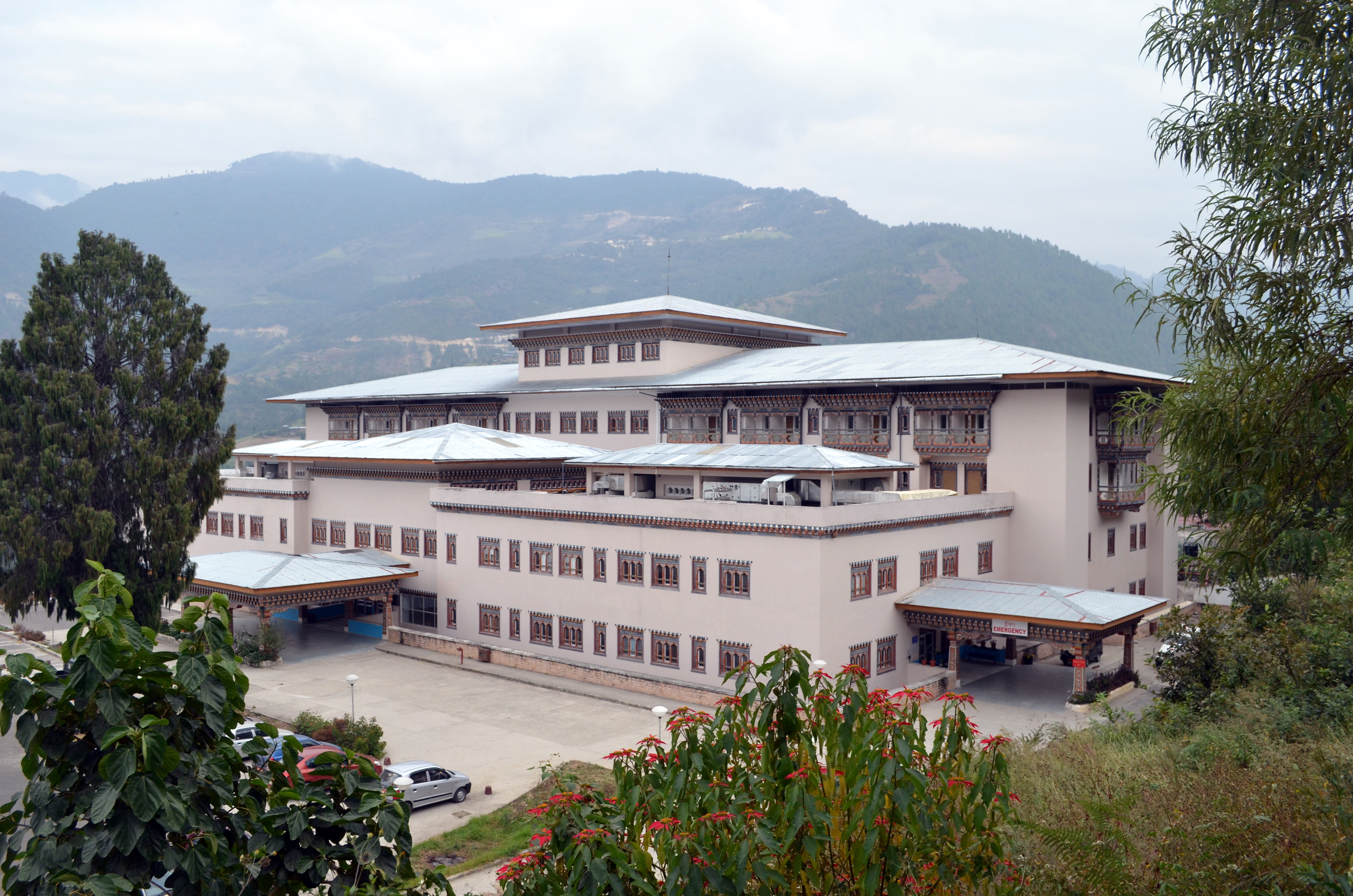
Regional Referral Hospital, Mongar

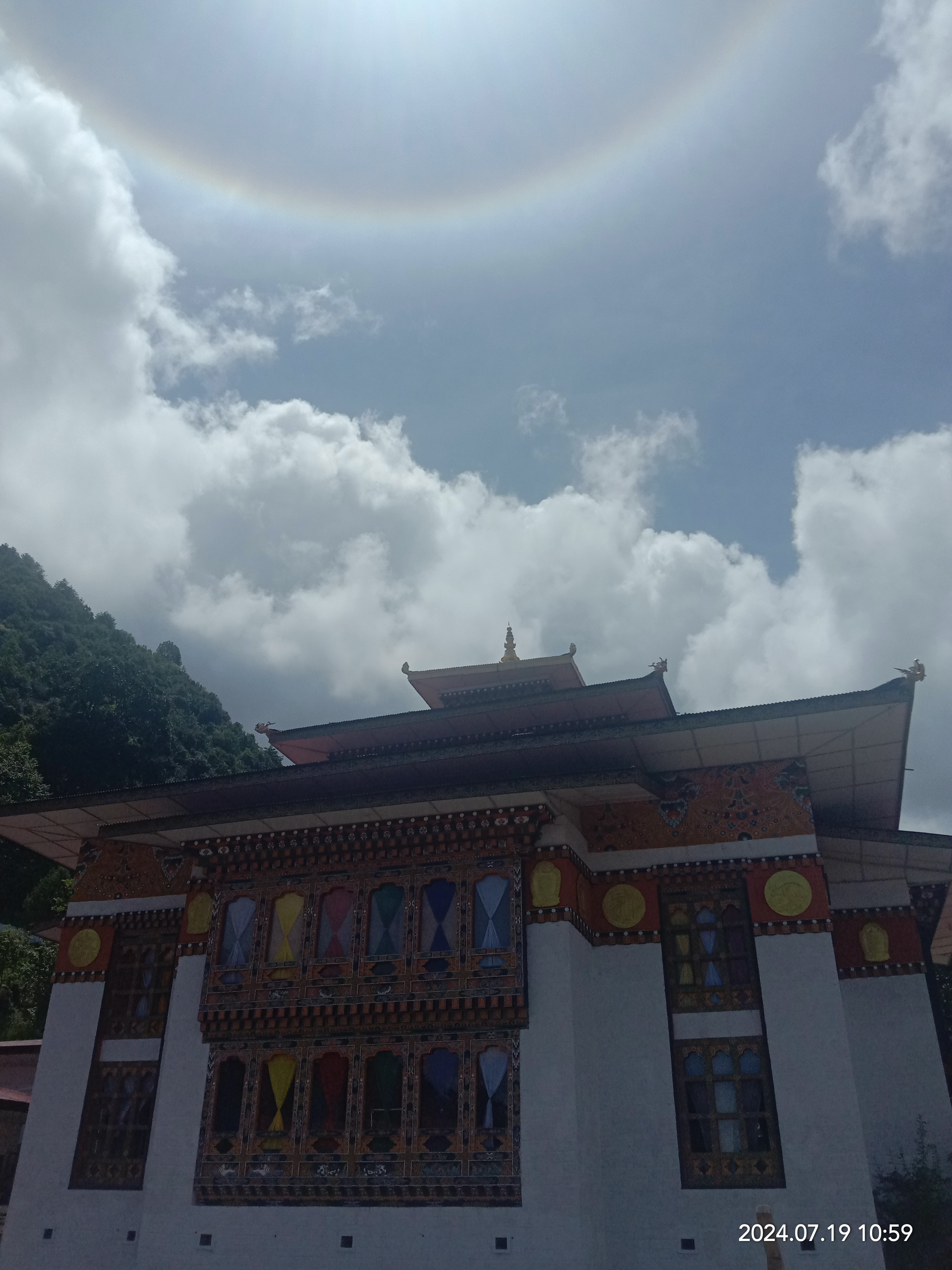
rainbow at Losel Yangchenling Nunnery

Mongar (Dzongkha: མོང་སྒར) is a town and the seat of Mongar District in eastern Bhutan. The population of Mongar Dzongkhag in 2022 was estimated at 36,383, comprising 17,498 males and 18,886 females. It included 10,084 residing in urban centres of Mongar, Gyalpoizhing, Lingmithang, Kidheykhar, Drametse and Yadi towns. The rural population of 7 Gewogs was 6,299. Mongar is on the road from Thimphu to Trashigang. It is one of the oldest educational hubs of the country. It has a regional hospital and a good standard hotel, among other facilities. The important Yagang Lhakhang monastery is on the outskirts of the town. The post code for Mongar post office is 43001. The ruins of Zhongar Dzong are located on the outskirts of Mongar. The Dzong has been in ruins since 1889.

== Pilgrimage གནས་སྐོར། ==
Entering Mongar district is a door to a multi-destination pilgrimage site brimming in Buddhist devotees. Thousands of devotees across the country visit the site for the purpose of pilgrimage and sightseeing holy places.

=== Sacred Aja Ney and Aja-Ugyen Draphu-Sheridzong Trail ===
The renowned Aja Ney་(ཨ་རྒྱ་གནས།) is located at an altitude of more than 3,500 meters under Sherimuhung Gewog. The most sacred are the 100 imprints of the sacred syllable “Ah” on the rock-cave left by Guru Rinpoche. The Nye also has a medicinal spring which the locals believe can cure 18 diseases, besides a nearby pool called Awa Chhu (now known as Uma Chuu). It is said to remove defilements in a person. It takes a minimum of three days to complete a pilgrimage to all the sacred sites.

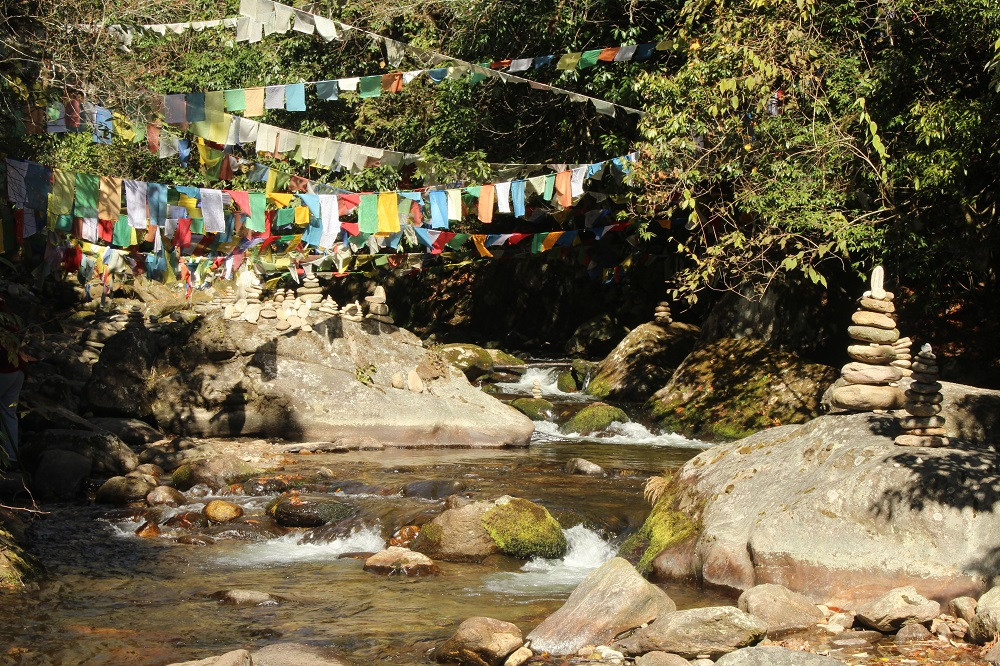
Mesmerizing Aja Ney

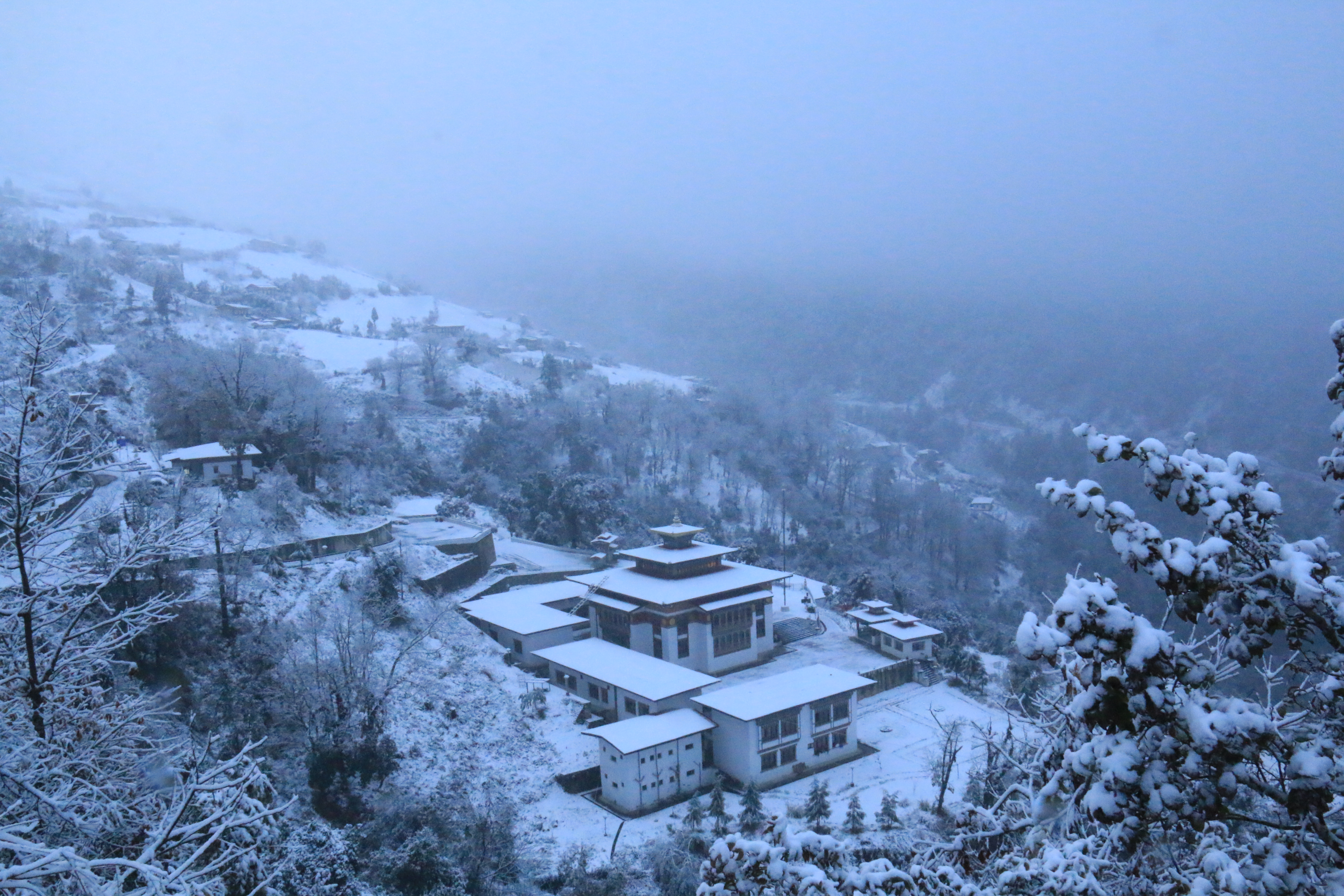
First snowfall at Losel Yangchenling Nunnery in 2022.

== Losel Yangchenling Nunnery ==
Losel Yangchenling Nunnery (བློ་གསལ་དབྱངས་ཅན་གླིང་བཙུན་མའི་བཤད་གྲྭ།) started construction in 2011, costing Nu 65 million, with the nuns taking up residence in 2016. Its new three-storey hostel houses more than 90 nuns.

More than 40 nuns from Losel Yangchenling Nunnery went to Thimphu in order to recite Droelma Bum at the National Memorial Chorten. It took 10 days and concluded on 10th day of the lunar calendar, the Saga Dawa, which is considered significant according to Buddhism. It was held mainly to pay tribute to His Majesty the Fifth King for his benevolent dedication to the Bhutanese people during the Covid-19 Pandemic.

== Climate ==
Mongar features a dry-winter humid subtropical climate (Köppen Cwa).

Climate data for Mongar, elevation 1,600 m (5,200 ft), (1996–2017 normals)
Month	Jan	Feb	Mar	Apr	May	Jun	Jul	Aug	Sep	Oct	Nov	Dec	Year
Record high °C (°F)	22.0 (71.6)	25.5 (77.9)	30.0 (86.0)	30.0 (86.0)	34.0 (93.2)	33.0 (91.4)	33.0 (91.4)	34.0 (93.2)	32.0 (89.6)	31.5 (88.7)	27.0 (80.6)	22.5 (72.5)	34.0 (93.2)
Mean daily maximum °C (°F)	16.7 (62.1)	19.1 (66.4)	21.9 (71.4)	23.6 (74.5)	25.5 (77.9)	26.6 (79.9)	26.7 (80.1)	27.3 (81.1)	26.4 (79.5)	24.4 (75.9)	20.8 (69.4)	17.8 (64.0)	23.1 (73.5)
Daily mean °C (°F)	11.3 (52.3)	13.3 (55.9)	16.3 (61.3)	18.4 (65.1)	20.4 (68.7)	22.1 (71.8)	22.4 (72.3)	22.7 (72.9)	21.8 (71.2)	19.1 (66.4)	15.4 (59.7)	12.5 (54.5)	18.0 (64.3)
Mean daily minimum °C (°F)	5.8 (42.4)	7.5 (45.5)	10.6 (51.1)	13.1 (55.6)	15.2 (59.4)	17.6 (63.7)	18.1 (64.6)	18.1 (64.6)	17.1 (62.8)	13.7 (56.7)	10.0 (50.0)	7.2 (45.0)	12.8 (55.1)
Record low °C (°F)	−1.0 (30.2)	−1.0 (30.2)	5.0 (41.0)	7.0 (44.6)	11.0 (51.8)	13.0 (55.4)	14.0 (57.2)	15.0 (59.0)	13.0 (55.4)	8.0 (46.4)	4.0 (39.2)	2.0 (35.6)	−1.0 (30.2)
Average rainfall mm (inches)	6.0 (0.24)	11.3 (0.44)	36.3 (1.43)	82.7 (3.26)	93.1 (3.67)	132.7 (5.22)	196.0 (7.72)	161.2 (6.35)	113.0 (4.45)	75.9 (2.99)	3.5 (0.14)	2.7 (0.11)	914.4 (36.02)
Average rainy days	0.9	1.6	5.4	9.0	9.7	13.1	16.8	14.4	10.4	4.4	0.9	0.8	87.4
Average relative humidity (%)	70.1	71.4	70.6	74.9	77.2	83.5	86.1	84.5	84.3	75.6	70.0	69.6	76.5
Source 1: National Center for Hydrology and Meteorology
Source 2: World Meteorological Organization (rainy days 1996–2018)
