= Jangdung =

Village in Bhutan

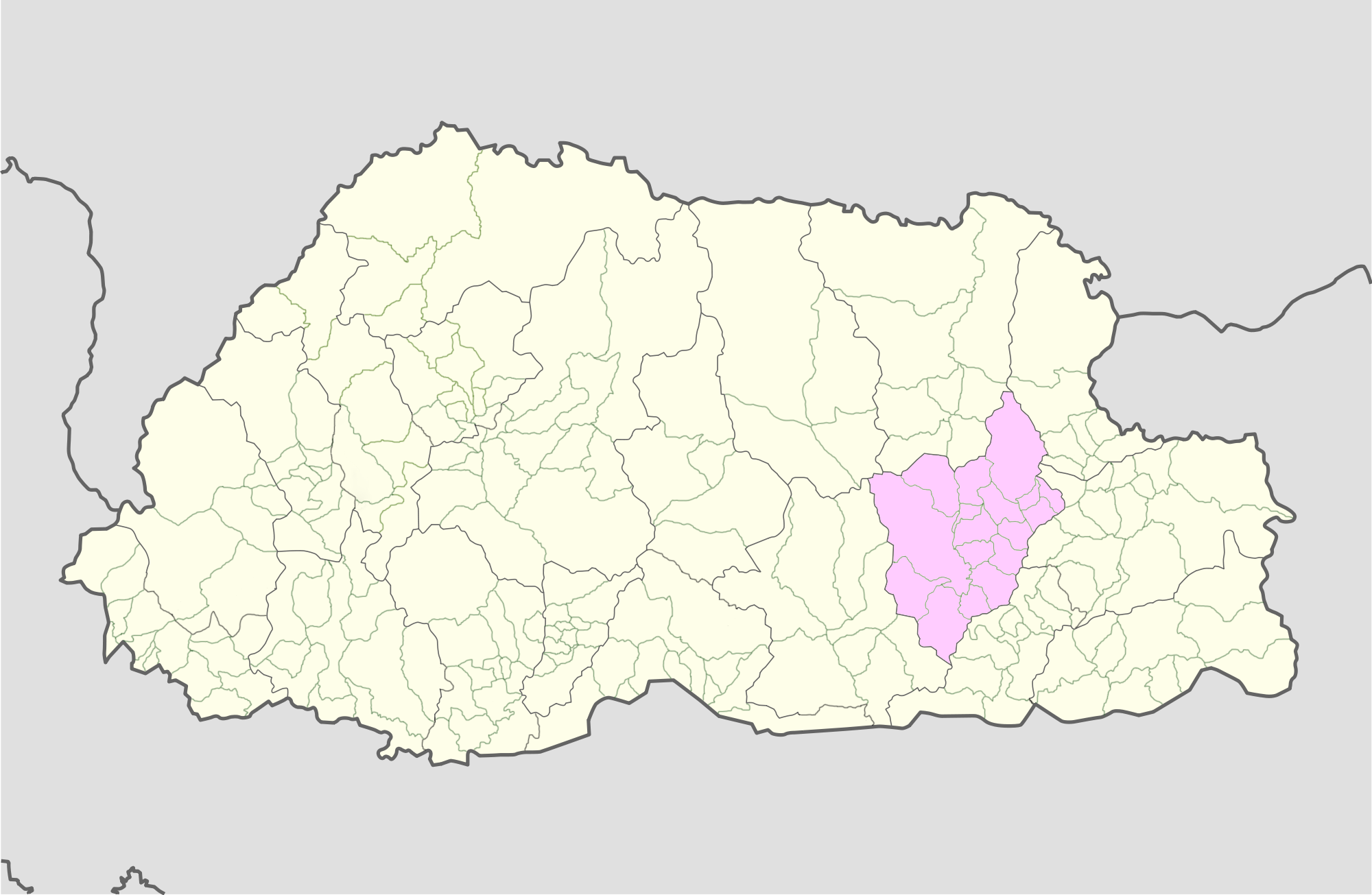
- Country: Bhutan
- District: Mongar District

Jangdung is a small agricultural village under Saling Gewog, in the eastern part of Bhutan. The village is one of multiple small hubs for private and community forestry in Mongar District, and is home to a nursery that supplies saplings across the region. The climate provides an ideal environment for growing tropical fruits such as avocados, mangos, dragon-fruits, passion-fruits, etc.
