= Tashi Dorji (royal) =

Member of the Bhutanese royal family

Ashi Tashi Chodzom Dorji (born 29 August 1923) is a member of the Bhutanese royal family.

== Biography ==
Ashi Tashi Dorji, sister of the Queen Grandmother and grand-aunt to the current King, was born in Bhutan House in Kalimpong on 29 August 1923, the daughter of Gongzim Sonam Tobgye Dorji and Sikkim Princess Choying Wangmo Dorji. In 1952, she was sent by the Third King, His Majesty Jigme Dorji Wangchuck to eastern Bhutan to help the people who were being harshly taxed by local rulers, empowering her to give Kidu (land) to the Zaps and Tayps (landless classes). This became known as Ashi Tashi Thram and stopped the mass exodus of Bhutanese from the east to India. During her stay in Trashigang she met many people with leprosy and spent most of her evenings administering penicillin. She wrote to the king that Trashigang needed a leprosy hospital. In 1954, she recruited soldiers for the king and helped establish an army training camp.

In 1962, Tashi represented her brother Jigme Palden Dorji, the Prime Minister of Bhutan, at the 14th meeting of the Consultative Committee of the Colombo Plan, held in Melbourne, Australia. Bhutan was not one of the 17-member nations, but Australian Prime Minister Sir Robert Menzies had invited Lyonchen Jigme to attend as an observer. Just as the official delegation was preparing to make the trip, the Sino-Indian War erupted. Lyonchen Jigme couldn't leave, so he deputised his sister to lead an all-women delegation that included his wife, Tessla Dorji, and his secretary Ms Benita Dunne. Tashi Dorji attended all the events and asked that Bhutan be allowed to join. Colombo's protocol meant Bhutan should wait two years, but Tashi Dorji impressed the leaders with her speech and Bhutan was invited to join straight away. It was the first international organisation Bhutan joined.

== Honours ==
On 11 July 2018 Ashi Tashi Dorji was the first Bhutanese national to be made an honorary Officer of the Order of Australia, in recognition of establishing strong ties between the two countries.

== Ancestry ==
Ancestors of Tashi Dorji (royal)

16. Pala Gyeltshen
8. Sherpa Puchung, Dzongpon
17. a Lady from Tsento, Paro
4. Raja Ugyen Dorji
9. Tsherim, a Lady from Tsento, Paro
2. Raja Sonam Tobgye Dorji
1. Tashi Dorji
24. Tenzing Namgyal, 6th Maharaja of Sikkim
12. Tsugphud Namgyal, 7th Maharaja of Sikkim
25. Anyo Karwang
6. Sir Thutob Namgyal, 9th Maharaja of Sikkim
13. Maharani Menchi
3. Rani Mayum Chonying Wangmo Dorji
14. Shiafe Uthok, of the Lhading House of Lhasa
7. Yeshay Dolma
