= Sonam Topgay Dorji =

Prime Minister of Bhutan

- སྲོང་འགྲེ་སྟོབས་རྒྱས་རྡོ་རྗེ།

2nd Prime Minister of Bhutan (Chief Minister)
- In office 1917–1952
- Monarchs: Ugyen Wangchuck; Jigme Wangchuck
- Preceded by: Ugyen Dorji
- Succeeded by: Jigme Palden Dorji

Personal details
- Born: 1896 Kalimpong, Bengal Presidency, British India
- Died: 1953 (aged 56–57) Bhutan House, Kalimpong, India
- Relatives: Dorji family, including Jigme Palden Dorji (son) and Tsering Yangzom (daughter-in-law)
- Occupation: Politician, Administrator

Sir Raja Sonam Topgay Dorji CIE (Dzongkha: བསོད་ནམས་སྟོབས་རྒྱས་རྡོ་རྗེ་; Wylie: bsod-nams stobs-rgyas rdo-rje; 1896–1953), also called Tobgay, was a member of the Dorji family and Bhutanese politician who served between 1917 and 1952 in the Royal Government under the First and Second Kings of Bhutan. During this period, Topgay Dorji officially held the posts of Gongzim (Chief Minister), Deb Zimpon (Chief Secretary), and Trade Agent to the Government of Bhutan. As such, Topgay Dorji was responsible for fostering Anglo-Bhutanese relations, and later, Bhutan–India relations. Topgay's ties with the west and modernist political factions contributed significantly to the modern political landscape and modernization of Bhutan.

Topgay Dorji inherited his positions from his father, Kazi Ugyen Dorji, who was instrumental in advising Ugyen Wangchuck before and after he became the First King of Bhutan. Topgay Dorji lived, worked, and died at Bhutan House, the Dorji's estate in Kalimpong, India, the traditional administrative center of southern Bhutan.

== Family ==
Topgay was the son of Gongzim Ugyen Dorji, adviser to Gongsar Ugyen Wangchuck both before and after the rise of the latter to the throne. Gongzim Ugyen Dorji had advised the future First King to mediate between the British and Tibet, and later to allow the large-scale induction of Nepalis into Bhutan establishing friendly ties with British India.

His paternal aunt was Ayi Thubten Wangmo.

Topgay Raja married Princess Mayum Choying Wangmo, the youngest daughter of the Sikkimese Chogyal, at Bhutan House on April 5, 1918. Together they had three sons and two daughters.

His eldest son was Jigme Palden Dorji, born in 1919. He went on to become Governor of Haa in 1924, and then to succeed his father as the first Prime Minister of Bhutan. Jigme Palden Dorji was assassinated amid a political struggle between modernist pro-Dorji and monarchist pro-Wangchuck factions. Topgay's second son was named Ugyen, born in 1933. Ugyen was recognized as a renowned lama at Bhutan House as a young boy. This lama was a strong influence in Tibet and Mongolia. He was thereafter called Ugyen Rimpoche, or Boedhay Rimpoche. The youngest son was Lhendup "Lenny" Dorji, born October 6, 1935. Lhendup served briefly as Acting Prime Minister in 1964. That year, he went into voluntary exile in Nepal and later settled at Kalimpong.

Topgay's elder daughter Ashi Tashi Dorji served as the Gyaltshab (King's Representative / Regent) of Eastern Bhutan. In 1964, she accompanied Lhendup into voluntary exile, though she returned to Bhutan in 1972. On October 5, 1951, Topgay's younger daughter Ashi Kesang Choden Dorji married the Third King Jigme Dorji Wangchuck, creating a new bond so prominent as to cause some discontent among other Bhutanese families. Topgay is thus an ancestor of the current Fifth King Jigme Khesar Namgyel Wangchuck.

== Life ==
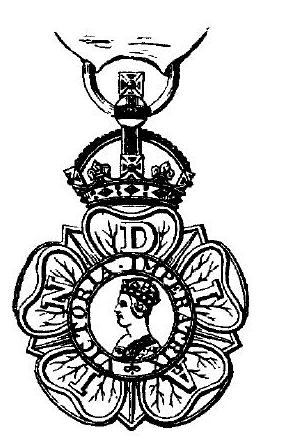
Insignia of the Order of the Indian Empire.

In 1917, Topgay assumed his father's positions as Gongzim (Chief Minister) and Trade Agent to the Government of Bhutan, however he functioned to a large extent as prime minister, foreign minister, and ambassador to India. Topgay, though young at around 21 years of age, thus became the First King Ugyen Wangchuck's closest adviser. Administering from Bhutan House, Sonam Topgay Dorji was also Governor of Haa, directly abutting the estate, between 1917 and 1924.

Through his position as trade intermediary, Topgay and the Dorji family amassed wealth reputedly greater than that of the royal family. He and his family also supported Western education of Bhutanese youths, paving the way for later educational reforms under the Third King.

On April 23, 1948, Topgay Dorji headed the Bhutanese delegation to recently independent India, meeting Prime Minister Jawaharlal Nehru. Topgay and Nehru established Bhutan–India relations, prompted by a growing security concern over Communist China. Bilateral negotiations lasted through August 8, 1949, culminating in the Indo-Bhutan Treaty, replacing the defunct Treaty of Punakha. Under the new agreement, India returned the land around Deothang, subject of part of the 1865 Anglo-Bhutanese War.

Throughout his career, Raja Sonam Topgay Dorji garnered several foreign honors. In 1917, he was granted the titles of Rai Bahadur and Raja by King George V. In 1918, he was made Deputy Minister (Kashag officer of the fourth rank) by the Thirteenth Dalai Lama of Tibet. Topgay was further created a Companion of the Order of the Indian Empire (CIE) on June 8, 1944.

== Death ==
Topgay Dorji died at Bhutan House in September 1953, due to his diabetes which had worsened over time.

== See also ==
- Dorji family
- History of Bhutan
- Politics of Bhutan
