= Paljor Dorji =

Bhutanese environmentalist and diplomat

Dasho Paljor Dorji
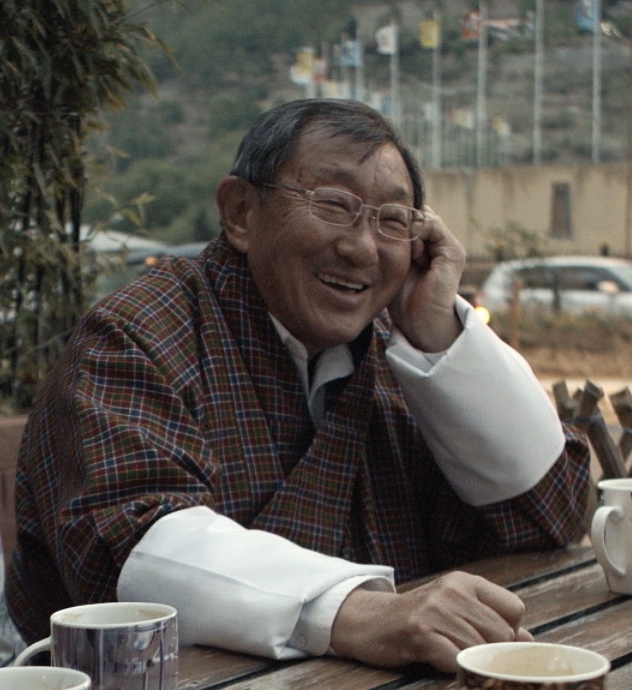

1st Chief Justice of the High Court of Bhutan
- In office 1974 – 1987 (Acting: 1974 – 1985)
- Monarch: Jigme Singye Wangchuck
- Preceded by: None, Office established
- Succeeded by: Sangay Penjore

Personal details
- Born: 24 August 1943 (age 83) Bhutan House, Kalimpong, India
- Children: 4
- Parents: Jigme Palden Dorji (father); Tsering Yangzom (mother)
- Relatives: Jigme Singye Wangchuck (cousin)
- Occupation: Diplomat; judge; environmentalist
- Known for: Founding Bhutan's first non-governmental organization, Conservation of black-neck cranes in Bhutan.

Dasho Paljor Jigme Dorji (Dzongkha: དཔལ་འབྱོར་འཇིགས་མེད་རྡོ་རྗེ), commonly known as Dasho Benji, is a Bhutanese environmentalist, judge and diplomat.

== Career ==
=== Environmentalism ===
Often referred to as Bhutan's "Godfather of Conservation", he established Bhutan's first non-governmental organization, the Royal Society for the Protection of Nature in 1987 to conserve the country's black-necked crane population and to preserve the country's biodiversity in general.

He was also involved in the drafting of "The Middle Path" the country's first National Environmental Strategy which was published in 1998. He also served as an advisor to numerous conservation and environmental organizations in Bhutan including the National Environment Commission. Dorji was also conferred the Jigme Singye Wangchuck Outstanding Environmental Stewardship Award for Policy Leadership. The Bhutan Ornithological Society as well as the Bhutan Ecological Society was founded by himself with him serving as founding president of the two organizations.

In 2018, he was named as one of the "Nature's Heroes" by the Royal Society for the Protection of Nature.

=== In the government ===
Dorji has served in the government of Bhutan as early as 1969. He served as an advisor to the former king of Bhutan, Jigme Singye Wangchuck

As judge he served as Magistrate of Paro District from 1969 to 1972, as High Court Judge from 1972 to 1974. Jigme Palden Dorji appointed him as the first Chief Justice of Bhutan's High Court serving from 1974 to 1987 (acting capacity from 1974 until 1985). He was succeeded by Lyonpo Sangay Penjore who was appointed by the king in 1987.

He was also Deputy Minister for Social Services from 1988 to 1991, and Deputy Minister to the National Environment Commission 1994 to 1997.

=== As Diplomat ===
As a diplomat, Paljor Dorji served as Ambassador to the United Nations and European capitals from 1991 to 1994. However, a lot is yet to be known

== Filmography ==
Paljor Dorji featured in the 2016 film Power of the River: Expedition to the Heart of Water in Bhutan an adventure documentary by American director Greg Hamilton which tackles about the issues on setting up dams in Bhutan's rivers.

== Personal life ==
Paljor Dorji is the son of Bhutan's first prime minister, Jigme Palden Dorji, and his Tibetan wife, Tsering Yangzom. Tobgye Dorji is his brother, a former diplomat who became a hotelier in Paro. A member of the royal family, Paljor Dorji is a cousin of Bhutan's fourth king, Jigme Singye Wangchuck. His mother was Ashi Tsering Yangzom, daughter of Tibetan aristocrat and official Tsarong.

He is also credited for bringing the sport of basketball in Bhutan having learned the sport in from Canadian Jesuits in a boarding school in Darjeeling, India. He also introduced the sport to the royal family having taught the sport to King Jigme Singye Wangchuck when the monarch was still a teenager.
