= Treaty of Punakha =

1910 treaty between Bhutan and British India

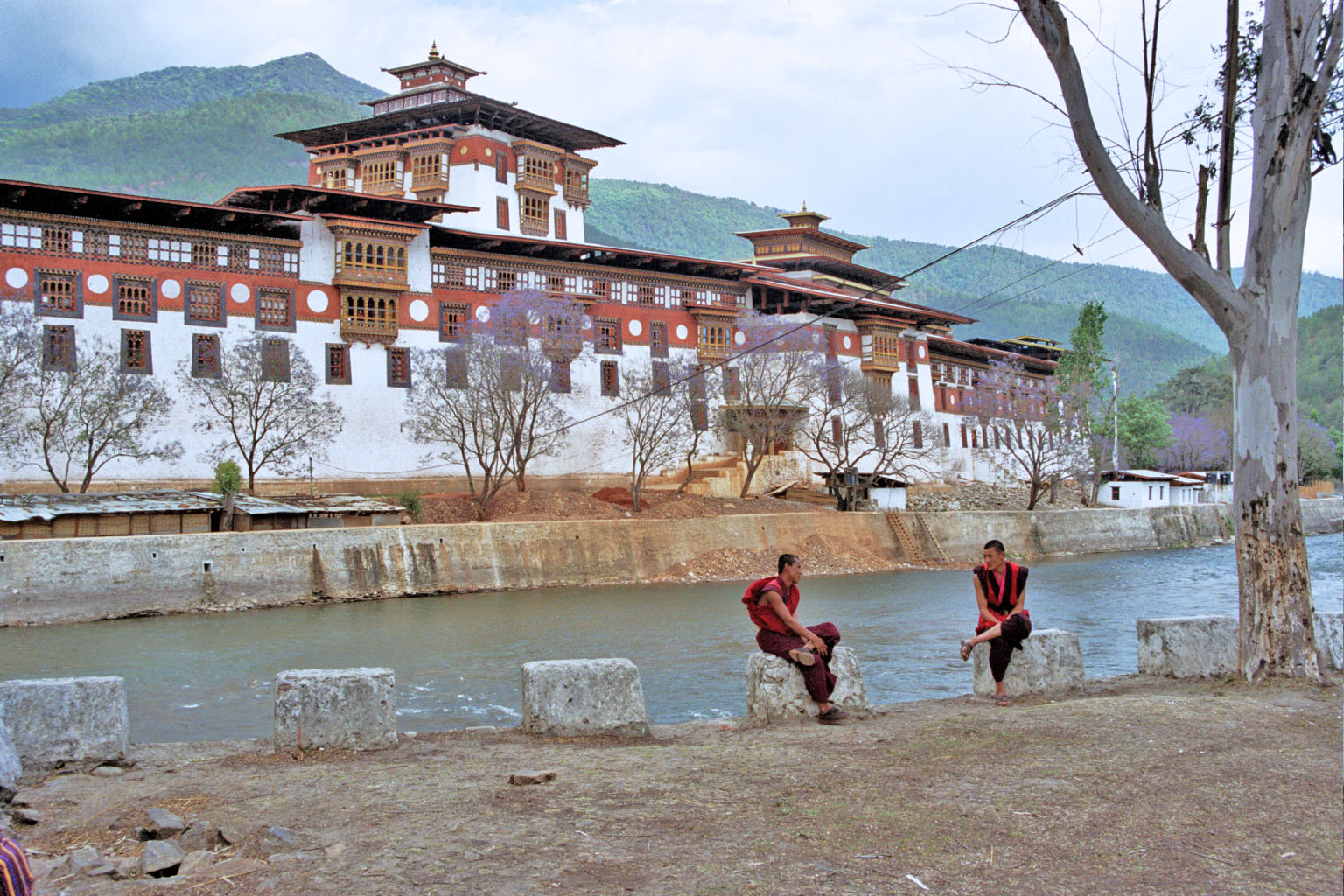
- Punakha Dzong, where the Treaty of Punakha was enacted
- Signed: 8 January 1910; 116 years ago
- Location: Punakha Dzong
- Effective: 10 January 1910
- Condition: Ratification by British India
- Expiration: 1947
- Signatories: Sikkim Political Officer Charles Alfred Bell; Bhutanese King Ugyen Wangchuck and his ministers
- Parties: British India; Kingdom of Bhutan
- Ratifiers: Viceroy and Governor-General Sir Gilbert John Elliot-Murray-Kynynmound (British India)
- Language: English

The Treaty of Punakha was an agreement signed on 8 January 1910, at Punakha Dzong between the recently consolidated Kingdom of Bhutan and British India. The Treaty of Punakha is not a stand-alone document, but represents a modification of the Treaty of Sinchula of 1865, the prior working agreement between Bhutan and British India. As such, the Treaty of Punakha is an amendment whose text incorporates all other aspects of the Treaty of Sinchula by reference.

Under the Treaty of Punakha, Britain guaranteed Bhutan's independence, granted Bhutanese Royal Government an increased stipend, and took control of Bhutanese foreign relations. Although this treaty began the practice of delegating Bhutanese foreign relations to another suzerain, the treaty also affirmed Bhutanese independence as one of the few Asian kingdoms never conquered by a regional or colonial power.

== Background and enactment ==
For five months, between 1864 and 1865, Bhutan and British India engaged in the Duar War, which Bhutan lost. As a result, Bhutan lost part of its sovereign territory, accompanied by forced cession of formerly occupied territories. Under the terms of the Treaty of Sinchula, signed on 11 November 1865, Bhutan ceded territories in the Assam Duars and Bengal Duars, as well as the eighty-three square kilometer territory of Dewangiri in southeastern Bhutan, in return for an annual subsidy of 50,000 rupees.

By the turn of the century, continuing geopolitical developments raised the question of a new treaty. Ugyen Wangchuck had consolidated power as Penlop of Trongsa and was unanimously elected monarch by government and religious cadres just two years earlier, in December 1907.

The Treaty of Punakha was enacted on 8 January 1910, at the signing at Punakha by Sikkim Political Officer Charles Alfred Bell and the first Druk Gyalpo (King of Bhutan) Maharaja Ugyen Wangchuck.

== Aftermath and abrogation ==
The Treaty of Punakha created a precedent for treaty modification and foreign suzerainty, and affirmed the practice of foreign subsidy to the Royal Government. The payments and lands subject to the Treaty of Punakha were accompanied by several contemporary and later agreements, some of which ultimately undid the Punakha amendments.

The Treaty of Punakha accompanied other contemporary agreements that had the effect of sharing profits from elephant hunting inequitably in Britain's favor; assigning land in Motithang (Thimphu Province) and a hill station between Chukha and Thimphu to the British; and assigning a portion of British Kalimpong to Bhutan, which later became Bhutan House owned by the Dorji family. The land around the Kalimpong estate had previously been ceded from Bhutan to British India at the conclusion the Bhutan War and as a condition of the Treaty of Sinchula in 1865. Kazi Ugyen Dorji of the Dorji family settled the land and took advantage of the lucrative trade routes through Kalimpong, and by 1898 assumed the roles of Trade Agent and mediator between the British Empire and Tibet.

On 8 August 1949, Bhutan's independence was recognised by India. On 23 April 1948, Sonam Topgay Dorji, also of the Dorji family, headed the Bhutanese delegation to recently independent India, meeting Prime Minister Jawaharlal Nehru. Topgay and Nehru established Bhutan–India relations, prompted by a growing security concern over Communist China. Bilateral negotiations lasted through 8 August 1949, culminating in the Indo-Bhutan Treaty. Under this agreement, India returned the land around Deothang, subject of part of the 1865 Anglo-Bhutanese War.

In February 2007, the Fifth King Jigme Khesar Namgyal Wangchuck signed a new treaty of friendship with India, replacing the treaty of 1949.

== Text of the treaty ==
Below is the full text of the Treaty of Punakha.

Whereas it is desirable to amend Articles IV. and VIII. of the Treaty concluded at Sinchula on the 11th day of November, 1865, corresponding with the Bhutia year Sing Lang, 24th day of the 9th month, between the British Government and the Government of Bhutan, the undermentioned amendments are agreed to on the one part by Mr. C. A. Bell, Political Officer in Sikkim, in virtue of full powers to that effect vested in him by the Right Honourable Sir Gilbert John Elliot-Murray-Kynynmound, P.C., G.M.S.I., G.M.I.E., G.C.M.G., Earl of Minto, Viceroy and Governor-General of India in council, and on the other part by His Highness Sir Ugyen Wangchuck, K.C.I.E., Maharaja of Bhutan.

The following addition has been made to Article IV. of the Sinchula Treaty of 1865.

"The British Government has increased the annual allowance to the Government of Bhutan from fifty thousand rupees (Rs. 50,000) to one hundred thousand rupees (Rs. 100,000) with effect from the 10th January, 1910."

Article VIII. of the Sinchula Treaty of 1865 has been revised and the revised Article runs as follows: –

"The British Government undertakes to exercise no interference in the internal administration of Bhutan. On its part, the Bhutanese Government agrees to be guided by the advice of the British Government in regard to its external relations. In the event of disputes with or causes of complaint against the Maharajas of Sikkim and Cooch Behar, such matters will be referred for arbitration to the British Government which will settle them in such manner as justice may require, and insist upon the observance of its decision by the Maharajas named."

Done in quadruplicate at Punakha, Bhutan, this eighth day of January in the year of our Lord one thousand nine hundred and ten, corresponding with the Bhutia date, the 27th day of the 11th month of the Earth-Bird (Sa-ja) year.

C. A. Bell, Political officer in Sikkim.

Eighth January, nineteen hundred and ten
(8 January 1910).

(seal)
Seal of Political officer in Sikkim.

Seal of Dharma Raja. [seal]

Seal of His Highness the Maharaja of Bhutan. (seal)

Seal of Tatsang Lamas. (seal)
Seal of Tongsa Penlop. (seal)
Seal of Paro Penlop. (seal)
Seal of Zhung Dronyer. (seal)
Seal of Timbu Jongpen. (seal)
Seal of Punaka Jongpen. (seal)
Seal of Wangdu Potang Jongpen. (seal)
Seal of Taka Penlop. (seal)
Seal of Deb Zimpon. (seal)

MINTO,
Viceroy and Governor-General of India.

This treaty was ratified by the Viceroy and Governor-General of India in Council at Fort William, on the twenty-fourth day of March, A.D. one thousand nine hundred and ten (24 March 1910).

S. H. BUTLER,
Secretary to the Government of India,
Foreign Department. (Note: The term "Bhutia", which appears in this text, does not refer to the modern Bhutia, but to the Bhutanese.)

— Treaty of Punakha

== See also ==
- Foreign relations of Bhutan
- History of Bhutan
- Treaty of Sinchula
- Unequal treaties
