= History of Bhutan =

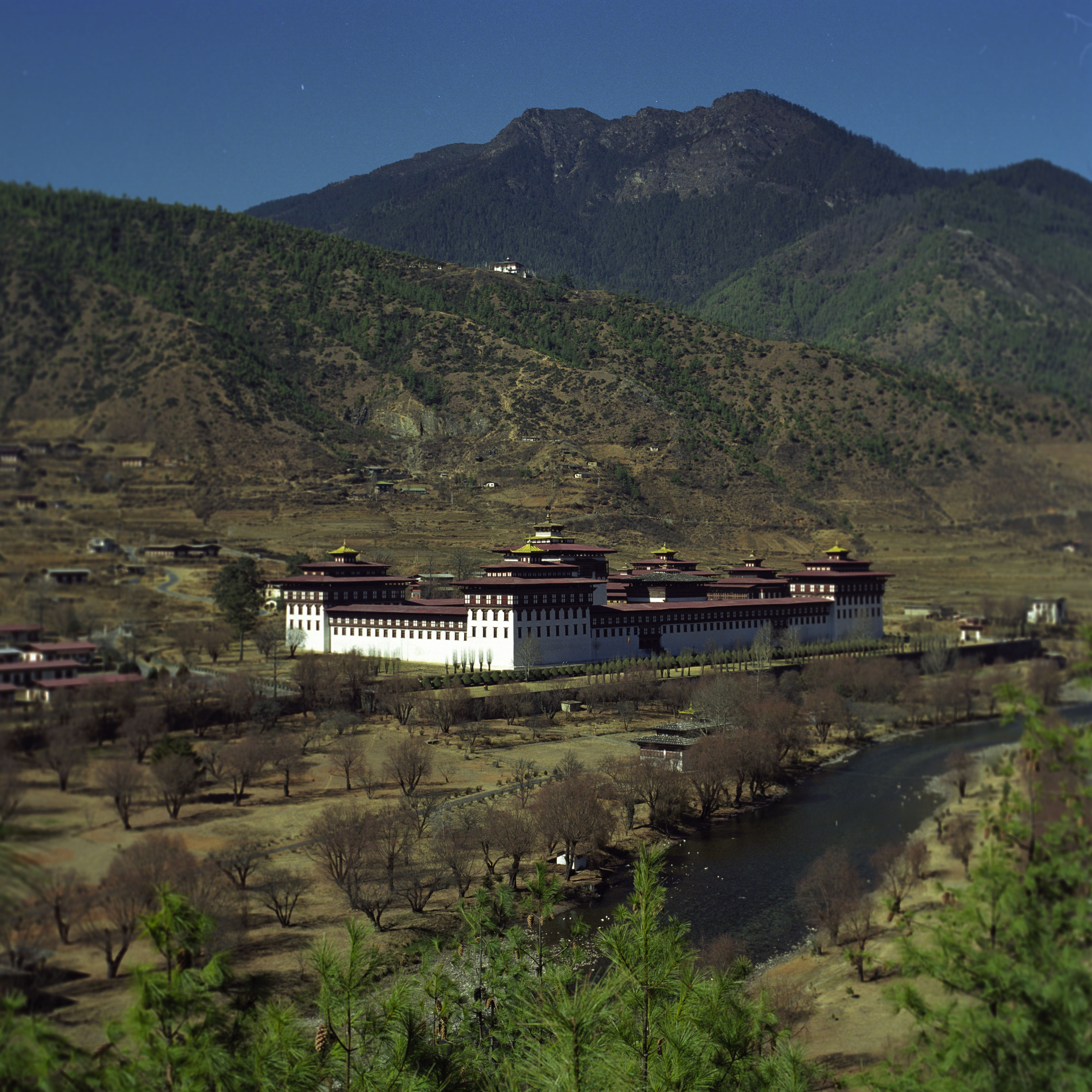
View of Tashichoedzong, Thimphu. The 17th-century fortress-monastery on the northern edge of the city, has been the seat of Bhutan's government since 1952.

Bhutan's early history is steeped in mythology and remains obscure. Some of the structures provide evidence that the region has been settled as early as 2000 BC. In the 12th century, the Drukpa Kagyupa school was established and remains the dominant form of Buddhism in Bhutan today. The country's political history is intimately tied to its religious history and relations among the various monastic schools and monasteries.

Since at least the tenth century, no outside power has ever occupied or governed Bhutan (notwithstanding occasional nominal tributary status).

The consolidation of Bhutan occurred in 1616 when Ngawang Namgyal, a lama from western Tibet known as the Zhabdrung Rinpoche, defeated three Tibetan invasions, subjugated rival religious schools, codified the Tsa Yig, an intricate and comprehensive system of law, and established himself as ruler over a system of ecclesiastical and civil administrators. After his death, infighting and civil war eroded the power of the Zhabdrung for the next 200 years. In 1885, Ugyen Wangchuck was able to consolidate power, and began cultivating closer ties with the British in the subcontinent.

In December 1907, Ugyen Wangchuck (Bhutan:འབྲུག་རྒྱལ་དང་པ་ཨོ་རྒྱན་དབང་ཕྱུག) was enthroned as the first hereditary king of Bhutan. In 1910, King Ugyen and the British signed the Treaty of Punakha which provided that British India would not interfere in the internal affairs of Bhutan if the country accepted external advice in its external relations. When Ugyen Wangchuck died in 1926, his son Jigme Wangchuck became the second king, and when India gained independence in 1947, the new Indian Government recognized Bhutan as an independent country. In 1949, India and Bhutan signed the Treaty of Peace and Friendship, which provided that India would not interfere in Bhutan's internal affairs, but would guide its foreign policy. Succeeded in 1952 by his son Jigme Dorji Wangchuck, Bhutan began to slowly emerge from its isolation and began a program of planned development. The National Assembly of Bhutan, the Royal Bhutanese Army, and the Royal Court of Justice were established, along with a new code of law. Bhutan became a member of the United Nations in 1971.

In 1972, Jigme Singye Wangchuck ascended the throne at age 16. He emphasized modern education, decentralization of governance, the development of hydroelectricity and tourism and improvements in rural developments. He was perhaps best known internationally for his overarching development philosophy of "gross national happiness." It recognizes that there are many dimensions to development and that economic goals alone are not sufficient. Satisfied with Bhutan's transitioning democratization process, he abdicated in December 2006 rather than wait until the promulgation of the new constitution in 2008. His son, Jigme Khesar Namgyel Wangchuck, became King upon his abdication.

== Origins and early settlement, 600–1600 ==
A state of Lhomon (literally, southern darkness) or Monyul (dark land, a reference to the Monpa, one of the Tibeto-Burman peoples of Bhutan), that was then beyond the pale of Buddhist teachings. Monyul is thought to have existed between about 1000 BC and AD 600. The names Lhomon Tsendenjong (southern Mon sandalwood country) and Lhomon Khazhi (southern Mon country of four approaches), found in ancient Bhutanese and Tibetan chronicles, may also have credence and have been used by some Bhutanese scholars when referring to their homeland. Variations of the Sanskrit words Bhota-ant (end of Bhot) or Bhu-uttan (meaning highlands) have been suggested by historians as origins of the name Bhutan, which came into common foreign use in the late 19th century and is used in Bhutan only in English-language official correspondence. The traditional name of the country since the 17th century has been Drukyul—country of the Drukpa, the Dragon people, or the Land of the Thunder Dragon, a reference to the country's dominant Buddhist sect.

Some scholars believe that during the early historical period the inhabitants were fierce mountain aborigines, the Monpa, who were of neither the Tibetan or Mongol stock that later overran northern Bhutan. The people of Monyul practiced a shamanistic religion, which emphasized worship of nature and the existence of good and evil spirits. During the latter part of this period, historical legends relate that the mighty king of Monyul invaded a southern region known as the Duars, subduing the regions of modern Assam, West Bengal, and Bihar in India.

=== Arrival of Buddhism ===
Buddhism was possibly first introduced to Bhutan as early as the 2nd century AD. Tibetan Buddhism was first introduced to Bhutan in the 7th century. Tibetan king Songtsän Gampo (reigned 627–649), a Buddhist convert, constructed 108 Buddhist temples in the Himalayan region, including a few temples at Bumthang in central Bhutan, Haa, Lhuentse and at Kyichu (near Paro) in the Paro Valley. Buddhism was propagated in earnest in 746 under King Sindhu Rāja (also Künjom; Sendha Gyab; Jakar Gyalpo), an exiled Indian king who had established a government in Bumthang at Jakar Gutho Palace.

Buddhism replaced but did not eliminate the Bon religious practices that had also been prevalent in Tibet until the late 6th century. Instead, Buddhism absorbed Bon and its believers. As the country developed in its many fertile valleys, Buddhism matured and became a unifying element. It was Buddhist literature and chronicles that began the recorded history of Bhutan.

In 810AD, a Buddhist saint, Padmasambhava (known in Bhutan as Guru Rinpoche and sometimes referred to as the Second Buddha), came to Bhutan from Nepal at the invitation of King Sindhu Rāja. After reportedly subduing eight classes of gods and demons and converting the king, Guru Rimpoche moved on to Tibet. Upon his return from Tibet, he oversaw the construction of new monasteries in the Paro Valley and set up his headquarters in Bumthang. According to tradition, he founded the Nyingmapa sect—also known as the "old sect" or Red Hat sect—of Mahayana Buddhism, which became for a time the dominant religion of Bhutan. Guru Rimpoche plays a great historical and religious role as the national patron saint who revealed the tantras—manuals describing forms of devotion to natural energy—to Bhutan. Following the guru's sojourn, Indian influence played a temporary role until increasing Tibetan migrations brought new cultural and religious contributions.

There was no central government during this period. Instead, small independent monarchies began to develop by the early 9th century. Each was ruled by a deb (king), some of whom claimed divine origins. The kingdom of Bumthang was the most prominent among these small entities. At the same time, Tibetan Buddhist monks (lam in Dzongkha, Bhutan's official national language) had firmly rooted their religion and culture in Bhutan, and members of joint Tibetan-Mongol military expeditions settled in fertile valleys. By the 11th century, all of Bhutan was occupied by Tibetan-Mongol military forces.

=== Sectarian rivalry ===
By the 10th century, Bhutan's political development was heavily influenced by its religious history. Following a period in which Buddhism was in decline in Tibet in the 11th century, contention among a number of subsects emerged. The Yuan dynasty overlords of Tibet and Bhutan patronized a sequence of subsects until their own political decline in the 14th century. By that time, the Gelugpa or Yellow Hat school had, after a period of anarchy in Tibet, become a powerful force resulting in the flight to Bhutan of numerous monks of various minor opposing sects. Among these monks was the founder of the Lhapa subsect of the Kargyupa school, to whom is attributed the introduction of strategically built dzong. Although the Lhapa subsect had been successfully challenged in the 12th century by another Kargyupa subsect—the Drukpa—led by Tibetan monk Phajo Drugom Zhigpo, it continued to proselytize until the 17th century. The Drukpa spread throughout Bhutan and eventually became a dominant form of religious practice. Between the 12th century and the 17th century, the two Kargyupa subsects vied with one another from their respective dzong as the older form of Nyingmapa Buddhism was eclipsed.

== Theocratic government, 1616–1907 ==
=== Consolidation and defeat of Tibetan invasions, 1616–51 ===
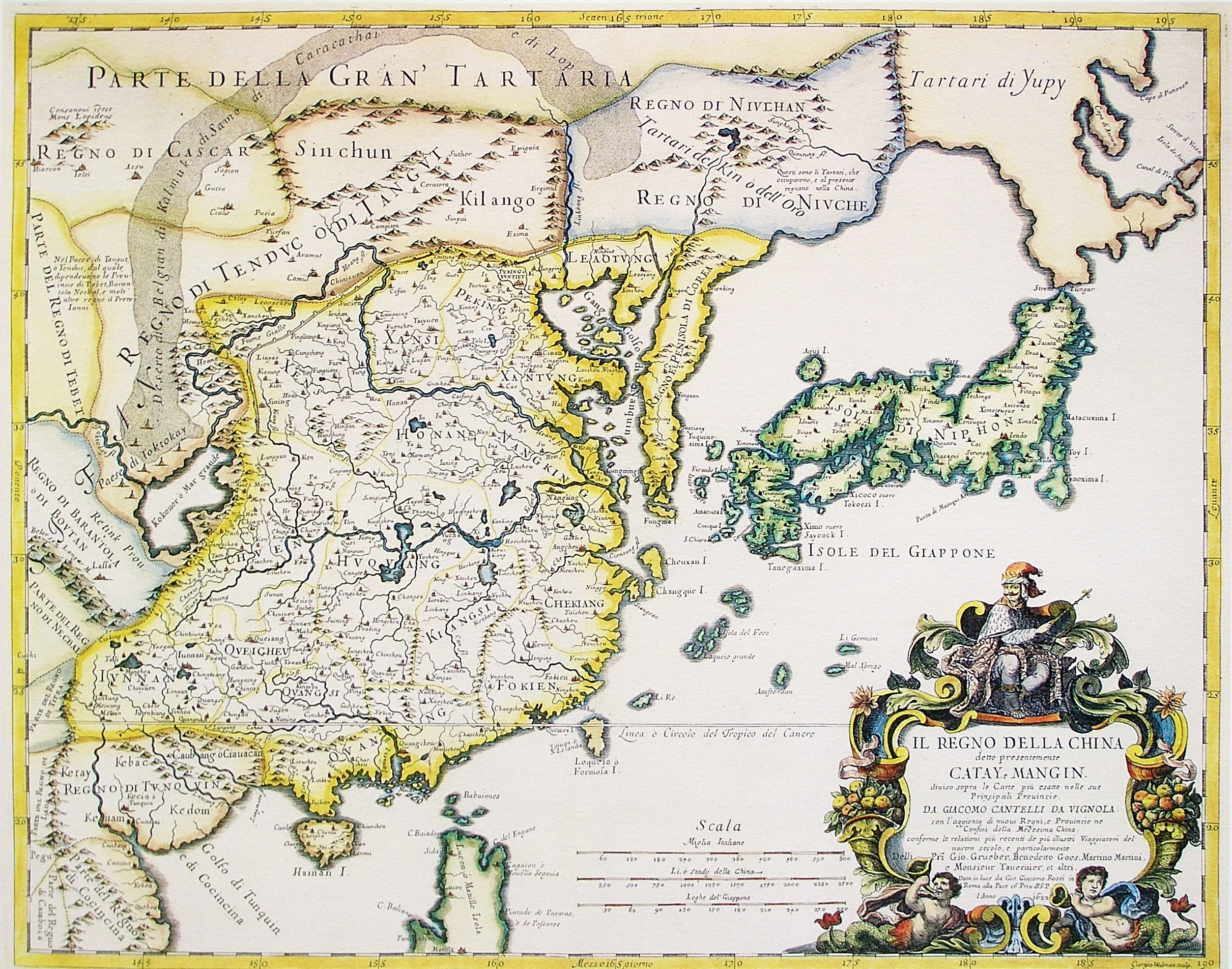
A 17th-century Italian map showing a large "Kingdom of Barantola or Boutan" bordering on Nepal and Tibet, as well as, surprisingly, Yunnan, Sichuan, and the Kingdom of Tanguts

In the 17th century, a theocratic government independent of Tibetan political influence was established, and premodern Bhutan emerged. The theocratic government was founded by an expatriate Drukpa monk, Ngawang Namgyal, who arrived in Bhutan in 1616 seeking freedom from the domination of the Gelugpa subsect led by the Dalai Lama (Ocean Lama) in Lhasa. After a series of victories over rival subsect leaders and Tibetan invaders, Ngawang Namgyal took the title Zhabdrung (At Whose Feet One Submits, or, in many Western sources, Dharma Raja), becoming the temporal and spiritual leader of Bhutan. Considered the first great historical figure of Bhutan, he united the leaders of powerful Bhutanese families in a land called Drukyul. He promulgated a code of law and built a network of impregnable forts (dzong), a system that helped bring local lords under centralized control and strengthened the country against Tibetan invasions. Many forts were extant in the late 20th century.

During the first war with Tibet, c. 1627, Portuguese Jesuits Estêvão Cacella and João Cabral were the first recorded Europeans to visit Bhutan on their way to Tibet. They met with Ngawang Namgyal, presented him with firearms, gunpowder and a telescope, and offered him their services in the war against Tibet, but the Zhabdrung declined the offer. After a stay of nearly eight months Cacella wrote a long letter from the Chagri Monastery reporting the travel. This is a rare report of the Zhabdrung remaining.

Tibetan armies invaded Bhutan around 1629, in 1631, and again in 1639, hoping to throttle Ngawang Namgyal's popularity before it spread too far. In 1634 Ngawang Namgyal defeated Karma Tenkyong's army in the Battle of Five Lamas. The invasions were thwarted, and the Drukpa subsect developed a strong presence in western and central Bhutan, leaving Ngawang Namgyal supreme. In recognition of the power he accrued, goodwill missions were sent to Bhutan from Cooch Behar in the Duars (present-day northeastern West Bengal), Nepal to the west, and Ladakh in western Tibet. The ruler of Ladakh even gave a number of villages in his kingdom to Ngawang Namgyal.

Bhutan's troubles were not over, however. In 1643, a joint Mongol-Tibetan force sought to destroy Nyingmapa refugees who had fled to Bhutan, Sikkim, and Nepal. The Mongols had seized control of religious and civil power in Tibet in the 1630s and established Gelugpa as the state religion. Bhutanese rivals of Ngawang Namgyal encouraged the Mongol intrusion, but the Mongol force was easily defeated in the humid lowlands of southern Bhutan. Another Tibetan invasion in 1647 also failed.

During Ngawang Namgyal's rule, administration comprised a state monastic body with an elected head, the Je Khenpo (lord abbot), and a theocratic civil government headed by the Druk Desi (regent of Bhutan, also known as Deb Raja in Western sources). The Druk Desi was either a monk or a member of the laity—by the 19th century, usually the latter; he was elected for a three-year term, initially by a monastic council and later by the State Council (Lhengye Zhungtshog). The State Council was a central administrative organ that included regional rulers, the Zhabdrung's chamberlains, and the Druk Desi. In time, the Druk Desi came under the political control of the State Council's most powerful faction of regional administrators. The Zhabdrung was the head of state and the ultimate authority in religious and civil matters. The seat of government was at Thimphu, the site of a 13th-century dzong, in the spring, summer, and fall. The winter capital was at Punakha Dzong, a dzong established northeast of Thimphu in 1527. The kingdom was divided into three regions (east, central, and west), each with an appointed ponlop, or governor, holding a seat in a major dzong. Districts were headed by dzongpon, or district officers, who had their headquarters in lesser dzong. The ponlop were combination tax collectors, judges, military commanders, and procurement agents for the central government. Their major revenues came from the trade between Tibet and India and from land taxes.

Ngawang Namgyal's regime was bound by a legal code called the Tsa Yig, which described the spiritual and civil regime and provided laws for government administration and for social and moral conduct. The duties and virtues inherent in the Buddhist dharma (religious law) played a large role in the new legal code, which remained in force until the 1960s.

=== Administrative integration and conflict with Tibet, 1651–1728 ===
To keep Bhutan from disintegrating, Ngawang Namgyal's death in 1651 apparently was kept a carefully guarded secret for fifty-four years. Initially, Ngawang Namgyal was said to have entered into a religious retreat, a situation not unprecedented in Bhutan, Sikkim, or Tibet during that time. During the period of Ngawang Namgyal's supposed retreat, appointments of officials were issued in his name, and food was left in front of his locked door.

Ngawang Namgyal's son and stepbrother, in 1651 and 1680, respectively, succeeded him. They started their reigns as minors under the control of religious and civil regents and rarely exercised authority in their own names. For further continuity, the concept of multiple reincarnation of the first Zhabdrung—in the form of either his body, his speech, or his mind—was invoked by the Je Khenpo and the Druk Desi, both of whom wanted to retain the power they had accrued through the dual system of government. The last person recognized as the bodily reincarnation of Ngawang Namgyal died in the mid-18th century, but speech and mind reincarnations, embodied by individuals who acceded to the position of Zhabdrung Rinpoche, were in the early 1990s. The compulsory admission to monastic life of at least one son from any family having three or more sons was instituted in the late 17th century. In time, however, the State Council became increasingly secular as did the successive Druk Desi, ponlop, and dzongpon, and intense rivalries developed among the ponlop of Tongsa and Paro and the dzongpon of Punakha, Thimphu, and Wangdue Phodrang.

During the first period of succession and further internal consolidation under the Druk Desi government, there was conflict with Tibet and Sikkim. Internal opposition to the central government resulted in overtures by the opponents of the Druk Desi to Tibet and Sikkim. In the 1680s, Bhutan invaded Sikkim in pursuit of a rebellious local lord. In 1700, Bhutan again invaded Sikkim, and in 1714 Tibetan forces, aided by Mongolia, invaded Bhutan but were unable to gain control.

==== Bhutan exclaves in western Tibet ====
During the 17th century Bhutan maintained close relations with Ladakh, and assisted Ladakh in its 1684 war with Tibet. Ladakh had earlier granted Bhutan several enclaves near Mount Kailash in western Tibet; these were monasteries of the Southern branch of the Drukpa sect and so fell under the authority of the Bhutanese Je Khenpo and the Zhabdrung. These enclaves persisted under Bhutanese control even after the rest of western Tibet came under the control of the Dalai Lama and his Gelugpa sect, until 1959 when the Bhutanese enclaves were seized by the Chinese. In addition to these outposts in Tibet, Bhutan for a time held monastic fiefs in Ladakh, Zanskar, and Lahul (now part of India), as well as in Lo Manthang and Dolpo (now part of Nepal).

=== Civil conflict, 1728–1772 ===
Though the invaders were unable to take control, the political system remained unstable. Regional rivalries contributed to the gradual disintegration of Bhutan at the time the first British agents arrived.

In the early 18th century, Bhutan had successfully developed control over the principality of Cooch Behar. The raja of Cooch Behar had sought assistance from Bhutan against the Indian Mughals in 1730, and Bhutanese political influence was not long in following. By the mid-1760s, Thimphu considered Cooch Behar its dependency, stationing a garrison force there and directing its civil administration. When the Druk Desi invaded Sikkim in 1770, Cooch Behari forces joined their Bhutanese counterparts in the offensive. In a succession dispute in Cooch Behar two years later, however, the Druk Desi's nominee for the throne was opposed by a rival who invited British troops, and, in effect, Cooch Behar became a dependency of the British East India Company.

=== British intrusion, 1772–1907 ===
Under the Cooch Behari agreement with the British, a British expeditionary force drove the Bhutanese garrison out of Cooch Behar and invaded Bhutan in 1772–73. The Druk Desi petitioned Lhasa for assistance from the Panchen Lama, who was serving as regent for the youthful Dalai Lama. In correspondence with the British governor general of India, however, the Panchen Lama instead punished the Druk Desi and invoked Tibet's claim of suzerainty over Bhutan.

Failing to receive help from Tibet, the Druk Desi signed a Treaty of Peace with the British East India Company on 25 April 1774. Bhutan agreed to return to its pre-1730 boundaries, paid a symbolic tribute of five horses to Britain, and, among other concessions, allowed the British to harvest timber in Bhutan. Subsequent missions to Bhutan were made by the British in 1776, 1777, and 1783, and commerce was opened between British India and Bhutan, and, for a short time, Tibet. In 1784, the British turned over to Bhutanese control Bengal Duars territory, where boundaries were poorly defined. As in its other foreign territories, Bhutan left administration of the Bengal Duars territory to local officials and collected its revenues. Although major trade and political relations failed to develop between Bhutan and Britain, the British had replaced the Tibetans as the major external threat.

Boundary disputes plagued Bhutanese–British relations. To reconcile their differences, Bhutan sent an emissary to Calcutta in 1787, and the British sent missions to Thimphu in 1815 and 1838. The 1815 mission was inconclusive. The 1838 mission offered a treaty providing for extradition of Bhutanese officials responsible for incursions into Assam, free and unrestricted commerce between India and Bhutan, and settlement of Bhutan's debt to the British. In an attempt to protect its independence, Bhutan rejected the British offer. Despite increasing internal disorder, Bhutan had maintained its control over a portion of the Assam Duars more or less since its reduction of Cooch Behar to a dependency in the 1760s. After the British gained control of Lower Assam in 1826, tension between the countries began to rise as Britain exerted its strength. Bhutanese payments of annual tribute to the British for the Assam Duars gradually fell into arrears. British demands for payment led to military incursions into Bhutan in 1834 and 1835, resulting in defeat for Bhutan's forces and a temporary loss of territory.

The British proceeded in 1841 to annex the formerly Bhutanese-controlled Assam Duars, paying a compensation of 10,000 rupees a year to Bhutan. In 1842, Bhutan gave to the British control of some of the troublesome Bengal Duars territory it had administered since 1784.

Charges and countercharges of border incursions and protection of fugitives led to an unsuccessful Bhutanese mission to Calcutta in 1852. Among other demands, the mission sought increased compensation for its former Duars territories; instead the British deducted nearly 3,000 rupees from the annual compensation and demanded an apology for alleged plundering of British-protected lands by members of the mission. Following more incidents and the prospect of an anti-Bhutan rebellion in the Bengal Duars, British troops deployed to the frontier in the mid-1850s. The Sepoy Rebellion in India in 1857-58 and the demise of the British East India Company's rule prevented immediate British action. Bhutanese armed forces raided Sikkim and Cooch Behar in 1862, seizing people, property, and money. The British responded by withholding all compensation payments and demanding release of all captives and return of stolen property. Demands to the Druk Desi went unheeded, as he was alleged to be unaware of his frontier officials' actions against Sikkim and Cooch Behar.

Britain sent a peace mission to Bhutan in early 1864, in the wake of the recent conclusion of a civil war there. The dzongpon of Punakha—who had emerged victorious—had broken with the central government and set up a rival Druk Desi, while the legitimate Druk Desi sought the protection of the ponlop of Paro and was later deposed. The British mission dealt alternately with the rival penlop of Paro and the Penlop of Trongsa (the latter acting on behalf of the Druk Desi), but Bhutan rejected the peace and friendship treaty it offered. Britain declared war in November 1864. Bhutan had no regular army, and what forces existed were composed of dzong guards armed with matchlocks, bows and arrows, swords, knives, and catapults. Some of these dzong guards, carrying shields and wearing chainmail armor, engaged the well-equipped British forces.

The Duar War (1864–65) lasted only five months and, despite some battlefield victories by Bhutanese forces, resulted in Bhutan's defeat, loss of part of its sovereign territory, and forced cession of formerly occupied territories. Under the terms of the Treaty of Sinchula, signed on 11 November 1865, Bhutan ceded territories in the Assam Duars and Bengal Duars, as well as the eighty-three-square-kilometer territory of Dewangiri in southeastern Bhutan, in return for an annual subsidy of 50,000 rupees. The land that was to become Bhutan House was ceded from Bhutan to British India in 1865 at the conclusion the Duar War and as a condition of the Treaty of Sinchula.

In the 1870s and 1880s, renewed competition among regional rivals—primarily the pro-British Penlop of Trongsa and the anti-British, pro-Tibetan ponlop of Paro—resulted in the ascendancy of Ugyen Wangchuck, the Penlop of Trongsa. From his power base in central Bhutan, Ugyen Wangchuck had defeated his political enemies and united the country following several civil wars and rebellions in 1882–85. His victory came at a time of crisis for the central government, however. British power was becoming more extensive to the south, and in the west Tibet had violated its border with Sikkim, incurring British disfavor. After 1,000 years of close ties with Tibet, Bhutan faced the threat of British military power and was forced to make serious geopolitical decisions. The British, seeking to offset potential Russian advances in Lhasa, wanted to open trade relations with Tibet. Ugyen Wangchuck, on the advice of his closest adviser Ugyen Dorji, saw the opportunity to assist the British and in 1903-4 volunteered to accompany a British mission to Lhasa as a mediator. For his services in securing the Anglo-Tibetan Convention of 1904, Ugyen Wangchuck was knighted and thereafter continued to accrue greater power in Bhutan. Ugyen Dorji, as well as his descendants, went on to maintain British favor on behalf of the government from Bhutan House in Kalimpong, India.

== Establishment of the hereditary monarchy, 1907 ==
Ugyen Wangchuck's emergence as the national leader coincided with the realization that the dual political system was obsolete and ineffective. He had removed his chief rival, the ponlop of Paro, and installed a supporter and relative, a member of the pro-British Dorji family, in his place. When the last Zhabdrung died in 1903 and a reincarnation had not appeared by 1906, civil administration came under the control of Ugyen Wangchuck. Finally, in 1907, the fifty-fourth and last Druk Desi was forced to retire, and despite recognitions of subsequent reincarnations of Ngawang Namgyal, the Zhabdrung system came to an end.

In November 1907, an assembly of leading Buddhist monks, government officials, and heads of important families was held to end the moribund 300-year-old dual system of government and to establish a new absolute monarchy. Ugyen Wangchuck was elected its first hereditary Druk Gyalpo ("Dragon King") and subsequently reigned from 1907 to 1926. Bhutan's Political Officer John Claude White took photographs of the coronation ceremony. The Dorji family became hereditary holders of the position of Gongzim (Chief Chamberlain), the top government post. The British, wanting political stability on their northern frontier, approved of the entire development.

Britain's earlier entreaties in Lhasa had unexpected repercussions at this time. The Chinese Qing dynasty, concerned that Britain would seize Tibet, established direct rule in Tibet in 1910 (the Qing dynasty had previously incorporated Tibet in 1720 but placed it under the administration of the Lifan Yuan). The Dalai Lama then fled to India. China laid claim not only to Tibet but also to Bhutan, Nepal, and Sikkim. With these events, Bhutanese and British interests coalesced.

On January 8, 1910, Sikkim Political Officer and Tibetologist Sir Charles Alfred Bell engaged Bhutan and signed the Treaty of Punakha. The Treaty of Punakha amended two articles of the 1865 treaty: the British agreed to double their annual stipend to 100,000 rupees and "to exercise no interference in the internal administration of Bhutan." In turn, Bhutan agreed "to be guided by the advice of the British Government in regard to its external relations." The Treaty of Punakha guaranteed Bhutan's defense against China; China, in no position to contest British power, conceded the end of the millennium-long Tibetan-Chinese influence. It also assigned land in Motithang (Thimphu) and a hill station between Chukha and Thimphu to the British, assigning a portion of Kalimpong (Bhutan House) to Bhutan.

Much of Bhutan's modern development has been attributed by Bhutanese historians to the first Druk Gyalpo. Internal reforms included introducing Western-style schools, improving internal communications, encouraging trade and commerce with India, and revitalizing the Buddhist monastic system. Toward the end of his life, Ugyen Wangchuck was concerned about the continuity of the family dynasty, and in 1924 he sought British assurance that the Wangchuck family would retain its preeminent position in Bhutan. His request led to an investigation of the legal status of Bhutan vis-à-vis the suzerainty held over Bhutan by Britain and the ambiguity of Bhutan's relationship to India. Both the suzerainty and the ambiguity were maintained.

== Development of centralized government, 1926–1952 ==
Ugyen Wangchuck died in 1926 and was succeeded by his son, Jigme Wangchuck (reigned 1926–52). The second Druk Gyalpo continued his father's centralization and modernization efforts and built more schools, dispensaries, and roads. During Jigme Wangchuck's reign, monasteries and district governments were increasingly brought under royal control. However, Bhutan generally remained isolated from international affairs.

The issue of Bhutan's status vis-à-vis the government of India was reexamined by London in 1932 as part of the issue of the status of India itself. It was decided to leave the decision to join an Indian federation up to Bhutan when the time came. When British rule over India ended in 1947, so too did Britain's association with Bhutan. India succeeded Britain as the de facto protector of the Himalayan kingdom, and Bhutan retained control over its internal government. It was two years, however, before a formal agreement recognized Bhutan's independence.

Following the precedent set by the Treaty of Punakha, on August 8, 1949, Thimphu signed the Treaty of Friendship Between the Government of India and the Government of Bhutan, according to which external affairs, formerly guided by Britain, were to be guided by India. Like Britain, India agreed not to interfere in Bhutan's internal affairs. India also agreed to increase the annual subsidy to 500,000 rupees per year. Important to Bhutan's national pride was the return of Dewangiri. Some historians believe that if India had been at odds with China at this time, as it was to be a decade later, it might not have acceded so easily to Bhutan's request for independent status.

== Modernization under King Jigme Dorji, 1952–72 ==
The third Druk Gyalpo, Jigme Dorji Wangchuck, was enthroned in 1952. Earlier he had married the European-educated cousin of the chogyal (king) of Sikkim and with her support made continual efforts to modernize his nation throughout his twenty-year reign. Among his first reforms was the establishment of the National Assembly — the Tshogdu — in 1953. Although the Druk Gyalpo could issue royal decrees and exercise veto power over resolutions passed by the National Assembly, its establishment was a major move toward a constitutional monarchy.

When the Chinese communists took over Tibet in 1951, Bhutan closed its frontier with Tibet and sided with its powerful neighbor to the south. To offset the chance of Chinese encroachment, Bhutan began a modernization program. Land reform was accompanied by the abolition of slavery and serfdom and the separation of the judiciary from the executive branch of government. Mostly funded by India after China's Tibetan uprising in 1959, the modernization program also included the construction of roads linking the Indian plains with central Bhutan. An all-weather road was completed in 1962 between Thimphu and Phuntsholing, the overland gateway town on the southwest border with India. Dzongkha was made the national language during Jigme Dorji's reign. Additionally, development projects included establishing such institutions as a national museum in Paro and a national library, national archives, and national stadium, as well as buildings to house the National Assembly, the High Court (Thrimkhang Gongma), and other government entities in Thimphu. The position of gongzim, held since 1907 by the Dorji family, was upgraded in 1958 to lonchen (prime minister) and was still in the hands of the Dorji. Jigme Dorji Wangchuck's reforms, however, although lessening the authority of the absolute monarchy, also curbed the traditional decentralization of political authority among regional leaders and strengthened the role of the central government in economic and social programs.

Modernization efforts moved forward in the 1960s under the direction of the lonchen, Jigme Palden Dorji, the Druk Gyalpo's brother-in-law. In 1962, however, Dorji incurred disfavor with the Royal Bhutan Army over the use of military vehicles and the forced retirement of some fifty officers. Religious elements also were antagonized by Dorji's efforts to reduce the power of the state-supported religious institutions. In April 1964, while the Druk Gyalpo was in Switzerland for medical care, Dorji was assassinated in Phuntsholing by an army corporal. The majority of those arrested and accused of the crime were military personnel and included the army chief of operations, Namgyal Bahadur, the Druk Gyalpo's uncle, who was executed for his part in the plot.

The unstable situation continued under Dorji's successor as acting lonchen, his brother Lhendup Dorji, and for a time under the Druk Gyalpo's brother, Namgyal Wangchuck, as head of the army. According to some sources, a power struggle ensued between pro-Wangchuck loyalists and "modernist" Dorji supporters. The main issue was not an end to or lessening of the power of the monarchy but "full freedom from Indian interference." Other observers believe the 1964 crisis was not so much a policy struggle as competition for influence on the palace between the Dorji family and the Druk Gyalpo's Tibetan consort, Yanki, and her father. Lhendup Dorji had earlier threatened to kill Yanki—his sister's rival—and ordered her arrest when, fearing for her life and that of her 2-year-old son by the Druk Gyalpo, she sought refuge in India during the political crisis. Lhendup also incurred the disapproval of the Druk Gyalpo by seeking to become sole regent of the kingdom after his brother's death, eliminating the Queen and the king's brother. Before returning to Bhutan from Switzerland, Jigme Dorji met with the Indian Secretary General and Foreign Secretary in Calcutta who offered Indian support, including paratroopers if necessary, to help the Druk Gyalpo restore order in the kingdom. Unable to regain the Druk Gyalpo's trust, Lhendup fled to London, while other supporters in the military and government fled to Nepal and Calcutta. Afterwards, in concurrence of the National Assembly, Lhendup Dorji and other family members were exiled in 1965. However, the exiles continued their attacks on the Druk Gyalpo and India, worsening relations between India and China. The tense political situation continued and in July 1965 there was an assassination attempt on the Druk Gyalpo. The Dorjis were not implicated in the attempt—which was described as a "private matter"—and the would-be assassins were pardoned by the Druk Gyalpo.

In 1966, to increase the efficiency of government administration, Jigme Dorji Wangchuck made Thimphu the year-round capital. In May 1968, the comprehensive Rules and Regulations of the National Assembly revised the legal basis of the power granted to the National Assembly. The Druk Gyalpo decreed that henceforth sovereign power, including the power to remove government ministers and the Druk Gyalpo himself, would reside with the National Assembly. The following November, the Druk Gyalpo renounced his veto power over National Assembly bills and said he would step down if two-thirds of the legislature passed a no-confidence vote. Although he did nothing to undermine the retention of the Wangchuck dynasty, the Druk Gyalpo in 1969 called for a triennial vote of confidence by the National Assembly (later abolished by his successor) to renew the Druk Gyalpo's mandate to rule.

Diplomatic overtures also were made during Jigme Dorji Wangchuck's reign. Although always seeking to be formally neutral and nonaligned in relations with China and India, Bhutan also sought more direct links internationally than had occurred previously under the foreign-policy guidance of India. Consequently, in 1962 Bhutan joined the Colombo Plan for Cooperative, Economic, and Social Development in Asia and the Pacific known as the Colombo Plan, and in 1966 notified India of its desire to become a member of the United Nations (UN). In 1971, after holding observer status for three years, Bhutan was admitted to the UN. In an effort to maintain Bhutan as a stable buffer state, India continued to provide substantial amounts of development aid.

Jigme Dorji Wangchuck ruled until his death in July 1972 and was succeeded by his seventeen-year-old son, Jigme Singye Wangchuck. The close ties of the Wangchuck and Dorji families were reemphasized in the person of the new king, whose mother, Azhi Kesang Dorji (Azhi means Queen), was the sister of the lonchen, Jigme Palden Dorji. Jigme Singye Wangchuck, who had been educated in India and Britain, had been appointed ponlop of Tongsa in May 1972 and by July that year had become the Druk Gyalpo. With his mother and two elder sisters as advisers, the new Druk Gyalpo was thrust into the affairs of state. He was often seen among the people, in the countryside, at festivals, and, as his reign progressed, meeting with foreign dignitaries in Bhutan and abroad. His formal coronation took place in June 1974, and soon thereafter the strains between the Wangchucks and Dorjis were relieved with the return that year of the exiled members of the latter family. The reconciliation, however, was preceded by reports of a plot to assassinate the new Druk Gyalpo before his coronation could take place and to set fire to the Tashichho Dzong (Fortress of the Glorious Religion, the seat of government in Thimphu). Yanki (who had four children with the Druk Gyalpo, including two sons, between 1962 and 1972) was the alleged force behind the plot, which was uncovered three months before the coronation; thirty persons were arrested, including high government and police officials. However, Lawrence Sittling, secretary to Jigme Dorji Wangchuck, later reported that the assassination plot was a fabrication by a Chinese diplomat designed to alienate Bhutan from India. But the truth was not any more politically acceptable—those arrested were Tibetan Khampas rebels, trained in India, who were traveling through Bhutan on a mission to Tibet. (Encyclopaedia of Saarc Nations, Syed) Under pressure from China, the Bhutanese government demanded that the four thousand Tibetan refugees living in Bhutan either become Bhutanese citizens or go into exile. Most chose exile. (Syed)

== International relations, 1972–present ==
When civil war broke out in Pakistan in 1971, Bhutan was the first nation to recognize the new government of Bangladesh, and formal diplomatic relations were established in 1973. An event in 1975 may have served as a major impetus to Bhutan to speed up reform and modernization. In that year, neighboring Sikkim's monarchy, which had endured for more than 300 years, was ousted following a plebiscite in which the Nepalese majority outvoted the Sikkimese minority. Sikkim, long a protectorate of India, became India's twenty-second state.

To further ensure its independence and international position, Bhutan gradually established diplomatic relations with other nations and joined greater numbers of regional and international organizations. Many of the countries with which Bhutan established relations provided development aid. Modernization of daily life brought new problems to Bhutan in the late 1980s. Television broadcast was official introduced in Bhutan in 1999.

=== Assamese separatists ===
Several guerrilla groups seeking to establish an independent Assamese state in northeast India have set up guerrilla bases in the forests of southern Bhutan, from which they launched cross-border attacks on targets in Assam. The largest guerrilla group was the ULFA (United Liberation Front of Asom). Negotiations aimed at removing them peacefully from these bases failed in the spring of 2003. Bhutan was faced with the prospect of having to strengthen its token army force to evict the guerrillas.

=== Military action against Assamese separatists December 2003 ===
On 15 December 2003 the Royal Bhutan Army began military operations against guerrilla camps in southern Bhutan, in coordination with Indian armed forces who lined the border to the south to prevent the guerrillas from dispersing back into Assam. News sources indicated that of the 30 camps that were targeted, 13 campers were controlled by ULFA, 12 camps by the National Democratic Front of Bodoland (NDFB), and 5 camps by the Kamatapur Liberation Organisation (KLO). By January, government news reports indicated the guerillas had been routed from their bases.

=== Refugee community ===
In 1988, Bhutan evicted some number of Nepali-speaking residents (Bhutanese reports say about 5,000 and Refugee reports says over 100,000) from districts in southern Bhutan, creating a large refugee community that was now being detained in seven temporary United Nations refugee camps in Nepal and Sikkim. The actual numbers were difficult to establish, as many of those in the camps were reported to be holding forged identity papers, and impoverished Nepalese citizens and started to migrate to the Nepalese community leaving their refugee camps. The reason for leaving refugee camps was to find a job, and services to those living in camps. Few of them returned to the refugee camps. As a result, the number of people living in the camps decreased exponentially. Although the Bhutanese government claimed that only about 5000 initially left the country, the number of actual migration was more than that.

After years of negotiations between Nepal and Bhutan, in 2000 Bhutan agreed in principle to allow certain classes of the refugees to return to Bhutan. However the situation was at a standstill, after violence was committed on Bhutanese officials by the angered people in the camps. Significant unrest was now reported to be fomenting in the camps, especially as the United Nations terminated a number of educational and welfare programmes in an effort to force Bhutan and Nepal to come to terms. As the Bhutanese government was unwilling to take them into their country many developed nations offered the refugees to allow them to settle in their own countries which included USA and Australia. As many as 20,000 Bhutanese refugees have been resettled in these countries.

== Formalized democracy ==
=== Constitution ===
On March 26, 2005, "an auspicious day when the stars and elements converge favourably to create an environment of harmony and success", the king and government distributed a draft of the country's first constitution, requesting that every citizen review it. A new house of parliament, the National Council, is chartered consisting of 20 elected representatives from each of the dzonghags, persons selected by the King. The National Council would be paired with the other already existing house, the National Assembly.

Per the Constitution, the monarchy is given a leadership role in setting the direction for the government as long as the King shall demonstrate his commitment and ability to safeguard the interests of the kingdom and its people.

=== Jigme Khesar Namgyel Wangchuck ===
On December 15, 2006, the fourth Druk Gyalpo, His Majesty Jigme Singye Wangchuck, abdicated all of his powers as King to his son, Prince Jigme Khesar Namgyel Wangchuck, with a specific intention to prepare the young King for the country's transformation to a full-fledged, democratic form of government due to occur in 2008.

The previous King's abdication in favor of his son was initially set to occur in 2008 as well. Still, there was an apparent concern that the new King should have hands-on experience as the nation's leader before presiding over a transformation in the country's form of government. According to the national newspaper, the Kuensel, the previous King stated to his cabinet that "as long as he continued to be King, the Crown Prince would not gain the experience of dealing with issues and carrying out the responsibilities of a head of state. With parliamentary democracy to be established in 2008, there was much to be done; so he needed to gain this valuable experience."

The fourth Druk Gyalpo further stated that: "Bhutan could not hope for a better time for such an important transition. Today, the country enjoys peace and stability, ensuring its security and sovereignty. After phenomenal development and progress, the country is closer than ever to the goal of economic self-reliance. Bhutan’s relationship with its closest neighbor and friend, India, has reached new heights. International organizations and bilateral development partners are ready to support Bhutan’s development efforts and political transformation."

== See also ==
- History of Asia
- History of India
- List of rulers of Bhutan
- Outline of South Asian history
- Politics of Bhutan
- Timeline of Bhutanese history
