= Ugyen Dorji =

1st Chief Minister of Bhutan

Gongzim Ugyen Dorji
- Kazi Ugyen, 1906.

1st Chief Minister of Bhutan
- In office 1907–1916
- Monarch: Ugyen Wangchuck
- Preceded by: Position Established
- Succeeded by: Sonam Topgay Dorji

Personal details
- Born: 1855
- Died: June 22, 1916 (aged 60–61) Bhutan House, Kalimpong, India
- Party: Independent
- Children: Sonam Topgay Dorji
- Parent(s): Sherpa Puchung; Tsherim

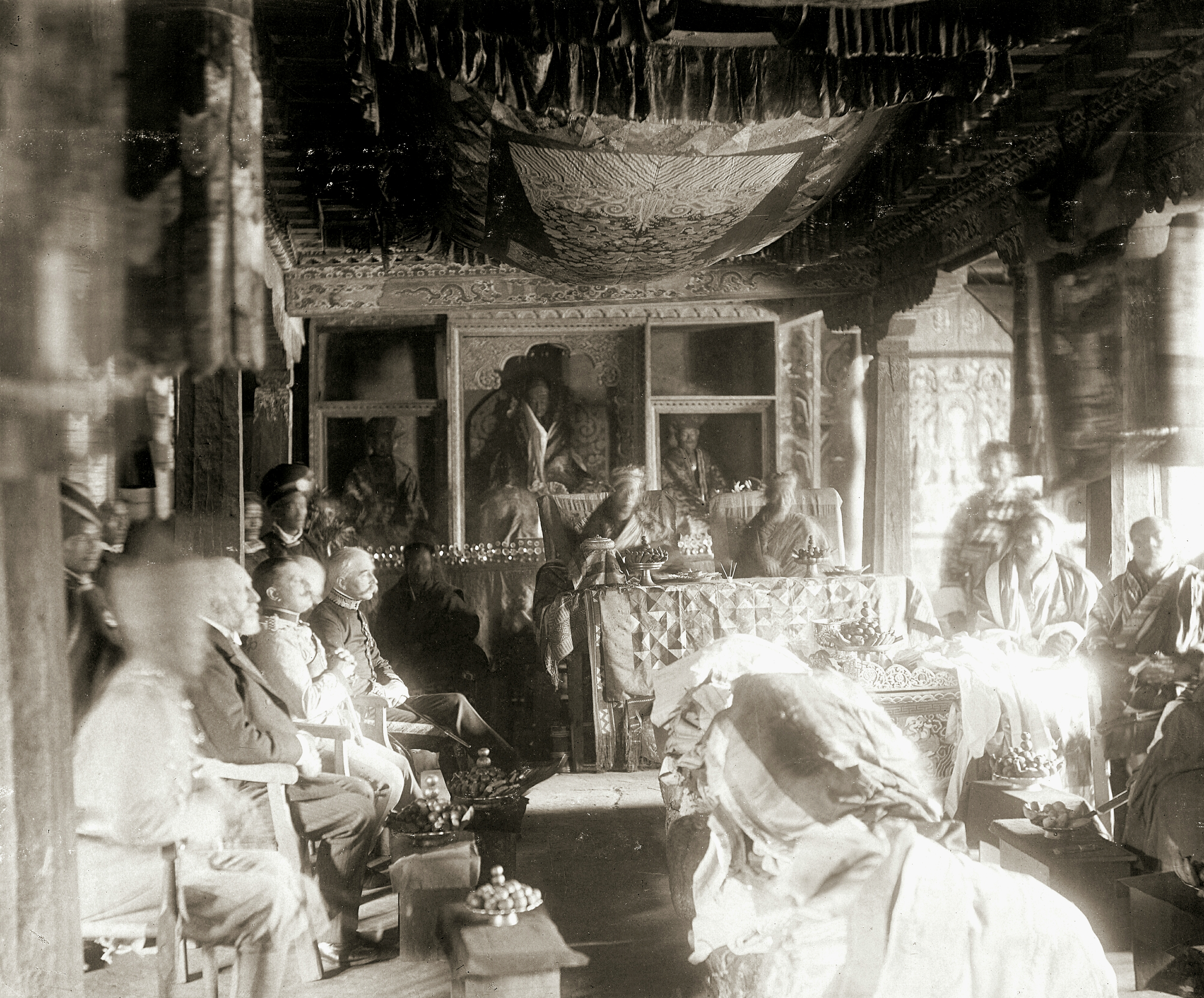
Kazi Ugyen seated on the right, when Ugyen Wangchuck received the grade of Knight Commander of the Order of the British Empire at Punakha Dzong, 1905.

Ugyen Dorji (Dzongkha: ཨོ་རྒྱན་རྡོ་རྗེ་, Wylie: o rgyan rdo rje, 1855–1916) was a member of the elite Dorji family and an influential Bhutanese politician. He served as the closest adviser to Ugyen Wangchuck, the Penlop of Trongsa and later King of Bhutan. Ugyen Dorji was instrumental in fostering friendly relations with the British after the Bhutan War (1864–1865), and providing support to the British expedition to Tibet in 1904. Operating from Bhutan House in Kalimpong, India, Ugyen Dorji used his position to open Bhutan to the outside world, establish Bhutan's foreign relations, and operate a lucrative trading outlet.

== Family ==
He was a son of Dasho Sharpa Puchung, Dzongpon, and his wife, Thinley Pem, a lady from the Tsento in Paro.

His sister was Ayi Thubten Wangmo.

Ugyen Dorji's son Sonam Topgay Dorji was born in 1896. His descendants maintained and developed the political power of Ugyen Dorji, marrying into the royal House of Wangchuck.

== Life ==
Ugyen Dorji served as Kazi from 1902 to 1907 to Ugyen Wangchuck the 12th Penlop of Trongsa, and then simultaneously as Penlop (Governor) of Haa, Gongzim (Chief Minister), and Deb Zimpon (Chief Secretary) (1907–1916) under the Royal Government as during its period of consolidation. Ugyen Dorji garnered increasing power through his connections to the successful House of Wangchuck and the British Empire. Kazi Dorji had advised the future First King to mediate between the British and Tibet, and later to allow the large-scale induction of Nepalis into Bhutan, establishing friendly ties with British India.

In 1910, Sikkim Political Officer and Tibetologist Sir Charles Alfred Bell engaged Bhutan and signed the Treaty of Punakha and other agreements that had the effect of assigning land in Motithang (Thimphu) and a hill station between Chukha and Thimphu to the British, assigning a portion of Kalimpong to Bhutan, and doubling the per annum subsidy from Britain to Bhutan. The land around the Kalimpong estate had previously been ceded from Bhutan to British India at the conclusion the Bhutan War and as a condition of the Treaty of Sinchula in 1865.

Kazi Ugyen Dorji settled the land and took advantage of the lucrative trade routes through Kalimpong, and by 1898 assumed the roles of Trade Agent and mediator between the British Empire and Tibet. The estate, which contained notable stables, contributed significantly to the development of the community and commerce in Kalimpong. From his estate in Kalimpong, India, Ugyen Wangchuck operated Bhutan House. Ugyen Dorji had the grounds consecrated by Chogley Yeshey Ngodrup on his return from a pilgrimage to Bodh Gaya.

In 1912, the Thirteenth Dalai Lama, Thubten Gyatso, stayed at the newly built Bhutan House for three months as the guest of Raja Kazi Ugyen Dorji and his sister Ayi Thubten Wongmo. Bhutan House itself was reportedly constructed by the Dorji family especially to host the Thirteenth Dalai Lama. The Dalai Lama dubbed Bhutan House Migyur Ngona Phodrang ("Palace of Unchanging Delight" or "Palace of Unchanging Supreme Joy") and presented the household with gifts of altars and consecrated statuettes, as well as many precious religious and secular robes. Once the Dalai Lama returned to Tibet, he sent Bhutan House a large gilded bronze statue of himself for the attached lhakhang (temple) he dubbed Dechen Gatsal ("The Happy Garden of Great Bliss"). In return, the household had offered the Dalai Lama silver to be dedicated for the production of a statue of the Thousand-armed and Thousand-eyed Avalokiteshvara (Chenrezi Chatong Chentong) in Lhasa, which the Dalai Lama had made. After the death of his host, the Dalai Lama gave the Dorji family a kashog (decree) written on yellow silk and sealed with his great seal; the kashog expressed his gratitude for the hospitality he received at Bhutan House, and for the efforts of the Dorji family to aid the Tibetan people. Because of its association with the Dalai Lama, Bhutan House is still known among Tibetans as Migyur Ngonga Phodrang.

== Honours ==
Ugyen Dorji was granted the personal title of Rai Bahadur on 1 January 1907. He was also promoted to Raja on 11 December 1911.

He received the Delhi Durbar Medal in silver twice (1 January 1903 and 12 December 1911) and the Ugyen Wangchuck Medal 1st class (17 November 1909).

== Death ==
Ugyen Dorji died at Bhutan House, on June 22, 1916.

== See also ==
- Dorji family
- House of Wangchuck
- History of Bhutan
- Politics of Bhutan

== Bibliography ==
- Dorji, Khandu-Om (2008). "A Brief History of Bhutan House in Kalimpong" (PDF). Journal of Bhutan Sudies. 19: 9–33. Archived from the original (PDF) on 5 January 2012.
- Rose, Leo E. (1977), The Politics of Bhutan, University of California Press, ISBN 0-8014-0909-8 – via archive.org
