= Jigme Palden Dorji =

1st Prime Minister of Bhutan

Dasho Jigme Palden Dorji

1st Prime Minister of Bhutan
- In office 1952 – 6 April 1964
- Monarch: Jigme Dorji Wangchuck
- Preceded by: Position Established
- Succeeded by: Lhendup Dorji

Personal details
- Born: 14 December 1919 Bhutan House, Kalimpong, India
- Died: 6 April 1964 (aged 44) Phuntsoling Guesthouse, Bhutan
- Cause of death: Assassination by gunshot
- Party: Independent
- Spouse: Tsering Yangzom
- Children: 4 (including Paljor Dorji, Kalden Dorji, Tobgye Dorji)
- Parent(s): Sonam Topgay Dorji; Choying Wangmo

Dasho Jigme Palden Dorji (Dzongkha: འཇིགས་མེད་དཔལ་ལྡན་རྡོ་རྗེ, 14 December 1919 – 6 April 1964) was a Bhutanese politician and member of the Dorji family. By marriage, he was also a member of the House of Wangchuck.

== Life ==
The brother-in-law of Jigme Dorji Wangchuck, Dorji was close to his kinsman and accompanied the future king when he lived in the United Kingdom in 1950. He was educated at North Point in Darjeeling and the Bishop Cotton School in Shimla.

In 1928, at the age of nine, Jigme Palden Dorji was appointed the Trungpa (Administrator) of Haa Dzongkhag and in 1953, he succeeded his father Raja Tobgay, after his death, as Bhutan Agent to Kalimpong. He became the first man to hold the title Prime Minister of Bhutan (Lyonchen). This followed the upgrading of the old position in 1958 as part of a wider series of reforms by Jigme Dorji Wangchuck.

As brother-in-law of the Dragon King of Bhutan, Dorji helped to implement the king's modernisation policies. However his reforms antagonised both the military and the religious institutions, leading to an army corporal assassinating him in April 1964. Brigadier Bahadur Namgyal, head of the Royal Bhutan Army, was amongst those executed for the murder plot.

== Death ==
The night before the assassination Jigme had met with Mr Avtar Singh, India's representative accredited to Bhutan at the time, at Samtse and left for Phuntsholing the day after. While playing cards with his brother Rimpochhe, Rimpochhe's wife Savitri and some others, Jigme was shot from a window ten feet to the rear of where Jigme was sitting.

On the capture and interrogation of the assassin, the assassin confessed that he received orders to shoot from Chabda Namgyal Bahadur, the army chief and uncle of King Jigme. Chabda Namgyal was discreetly arrested at the palace quarters and was executed. Quartermaster General Bacchu Phugel was also arrested and placed under strict detention in relation to the assassination. It was purported that although Chabda Namgyal had given the orders, Bacchu Phugel was actually the brains behind the assassination. Before any verdict was reached, Bacchu Phugel was stabbed and killed in his cell during the night.

The investigation into the assassination ended with the execution of Chabda Namgyal and did not unveil any motives behind the assassination. But it is suspected that the assassination happened due to the rising power struggle between Chabda Namgyal, Bacchu Phugel and the concubine versus Jigme Palden Dorji. There was a rift between Chabda and Bacchu due to the new policies and infusion of young blood into high positions by Jigme Palden Dorji. It was also reported that when the concubine was using army transportation for her personal use, Jigme Palden Dorji transferred the trucks to the civil administration, which increased tensions between them.

Following the assassination of Jigme Palden Dorji, his younger brother Lhendup Dorji assumed the office of Prime Minister. Indian diplomat Maharajakrishna Rasgotra later wrote that Lhendup suspected King Jigme Dorji Wangchuck of indirect involvement in his brother's death and sought to remove the Wangchuk dynasty "one way or another," hoping to secure Indian support for the effort. According to Rasgotra, once the King became aware of the alleged plot, Lhendup and several members of his family were exiled in 1965. The political tensions surrounding the affair were further underscored by an assassination attempt on the King.

== Honours ==
- King Mahendra Investiture Medal (Kingdom of Nepal, 2 May 1956).

== Ancestry ==
Ancestors of Jigme Palden Dorji

16. Pala Gyeltshen
8. Sherpa Puchung, Dzongpon
17. a Lady from Tsento, Paro
4. Raja Ugyen Dorji
9. Tsherim, a Lady from Tsento, Paro
2. Raja Sonam Tobgye Dorji
1. Jigme Palden Dorji
24. Tenzing Namgyal, 6th Maharaja of Sikkim
12. Tsugphud Namgyal, 7th Maharaja of Sikkim
25. Anyo Karwang
6. Sir Thutob Namgyal, 9th Maharaja of Sikkim
13. Maharani Menchi
3. Rani Mayum Chonying Wangmo Dorji
14. Shiafe Uthok, of the Lhading House of Lhasa
7. Yeshay Dolma

Political offices
Preceded by office created	Prime Minister of Bhutan; 1952–1964	Succeeded by Lhendup Dorji; Acting
