= Dorji family =

Bhutanese political family

The Dorji family (Dzongkha: རྡོ་རྗེ་; Wylie: Rdo-rje) of Bhutan has been a prominent and powerful political family in the kingdom since the 12th century AD. The family has produced monarchs, Prime Ministers of Bhutan, Dzong lords and governors. The Dorji family’s noble lineage traces back to the Tang Valley of Bumthang, connecting them to the revered 15th-century treasure revealer, Pema Lingpa, who was born in central Bhutan in 1450. This shared heritage deeply connects the Dorji family with the Royal Wangchuck dynasty.

Born of the noble lineage of the Great Pema Lingpa—the legendary 15th century Bhutanese treasure revealer—siblings Pala Gyeltshen and Pila Goenpo Wangyal stand as direct descendants of his sacred bloodline.

The brothers Pala Gyeltshen and Pila Goenpo Wangyal were eminent Bhutanese warriors and influential figures from the Dungkar Choejey lineage. As direct descendants of the revered treasure revealer Pema Lingpa, they stand as the shared ancestral pillars of Bhutan's most prominent noble houses: the Royal Wangchuck Dynasty and the Dorji family. From this lineage, Pala Gyeltshen’s descendant, Gongzim Ugyen Dorji, firmly established the prominence of the Dorji family, while the descendants of Pila Goenpo Wangyal founded the Royal Wangchuck Dynasty.

== History ==
The powerful aristocratic Dorji family are descended from the influential 12th-century aristocratic Lama Sum-phrang Chos-rje (b.1179; d. 1265). The Dorji family are therefore also descended from the aristocratic Dungkar Choji (b. 1578) of the prominent Nyö clan. This means that the Dorji family are related by blood to the reigning Wangchuck monarchs who share the same ancestors. In fact Gongzim Ugyen Dorji (b.1855; d.1916) who served as the Chamberlain (Gongzim) to the first king Ugyen Wangchuck was also his second cousin, because they shared the same great-grandfather Padma, son of the aristocratic Rabgyas.

From the beginning of Bhutan's hereditary monarchy, members of the family served as gongzim (Chamberlain, the top government post), and their official residence was at the palatial Bhutan House at Kalimpong.

Gongzim Ugyen Dorji as a befitting a person born as an aristocrat, was groomed for diplomacy and politics from a very early age by his father Shap Penchung who was a very influential member of the court, as well as being the Dzongpon (Dzong Lord) of Jungtsa. As a young lad, Gongzim Ugen Dorji acted as a moderator between the British diplomatic officials and the Bhutanese court. And in 1864 he accompanied his father to meet the British diplomatic mission under Sir Ashley Eden. At this time, Sir Ashley Eden and his entourage were incarcerated and threatened with execution by the Bhutanese government officials, but Gongzim Ugyen Dorji's father Shatpa Puenchung was instrumental in saving their lives and setting them free. This diplomatic crisis resulted in the Duar wars between the Bhutanese and the British Empire. As an adult, Gongzim Ugen Dorji became Chief Minister to his second cousin Penlop (Lord) Ugyen Wangchuck and was instrumental in uniting the various fiefdoms of Bhutan to create a hereditary monarchy with Ugyen Wangchuck as the first reigning Dragon King. The role of Chamberlain became hereditary within the Dorji family and Gongzim Ugyen Dorji was succeeded in this position by his son Sonam Topgay Dorji. In turn, Sonam Topgay Dorji's eldest son Jigme Palden Dorji was appointed Chief Minister to his kinsman King Jigme Dorji Wangchuck in 1952. In 1958, he became the first man to hold the title Prime Minister of Bhutan (Lyonchen), when the position of Chief Minister was upgraded in 1958, as part of a wider series of reforms by King Jigme Dorji Wangchuck.

From Bhutan House, Gongzim Ugyen Dorji's son Raja Sonam Topgay Dorji ("Topgay Raja") held the post of Trade Agent to the Government of Bhutan, however he functioned to a large extent as prime minister, foreign minister, and ambassador to India. Through this position as a trade intermediary, the Dorji family amassed wealth reputedly greater than that of the royal family. Topgay Raja himself married a Sikkimese princess, Rani Mayum Choying Wangmo Dorji.

In 1904, Trongsa Penlop Ugyen Wangchuck, firmly in power and advised by Gongzim Ugyen Dorji of the Dorji family, accompanied the British expedition to Tibet as an invaluable intermediary, earning the Penlop his first British knighthood. The same year, a power vacuum formed within the already dysfunctional Bhutanese dual system of government. Civil administration had fallen to the hands of Wangchuck, and in November 1907 he was unanimously elected hereditary monarch by an assembly of the leading members of the clergy, officials, and aristocratic families. His ascendency to the throne ended the traditional in place for nearly 300 years and the beginning of the Royal House of Wangchuck.

After two generations as Gongzim to the Wangchuck dynasty, Kesang Choden, the sister of Prime Minister Jigme Palden Dorji – the daughter of Topgay Raja and Princess Rani Mayum Choyin Wangmo of Sikkim – married the Third King, creating a new bond so prominent as to cause discontent among other Bhutanese families. The public was divided between pro-modernist and pro-monarchist camps.

=== Assassination of Jigme Dorji ===
In the early 1960s, the Third King fell ill and went to Switzerland for treatment. Dorji conflicted with the Royal Bhutan Army over the use of military vehicles, forced the retirement of some 50 military officers, and sought to limit the power of state-supported religious institutions such as the Dratshang Lhentshog and Je Khenpo. On April 5, 1964, reformist Prime Minister Jigme Palden Dorji was assassinated in Phuentsholing by military cadres as the king lay ill in Switzerland. The Dorji family was subsequently put under close watch.

The King's own uncle and head of the Royal Bhutan Army, Namgyal Bahadur, was among those executed for their role in the assassination of Jigme palden Dorji.

The post of Prime Minister (Lyonchen) was vacant, and the King identified Jigme Dorji's brother Lhendup as the successor. Lhendup's mother, then head of the Dorji family, advised the King against giving any title to Lhendup because it would have made the situation more explosive. In 1964, however, the King announced his intention to appoint Lhendup as Lyonchen. In 1965, with the approval of the National Assembly, Lhendup Dorji and several members of his family were exiled. Political tensions remained high during this period, and an assassination attempt on King Jigme Dorji Wangchuck in July 1965 further deepened the crisis. According to Indian diplomat Maharajakrishna Rasgotra, Lhendup believed that the King had been indirectly involved in the assassination of his brother, Jigme Palden Dorji, and sought support from the Indian government to remove the king from power. Following his exile, Lhendup lived in Nepal, where he reportedly worked as a chicken farmer. After the death of King Jigme Dorji Wangchuck, Lhendup was permitted to return to Bhutan in 1974.

== List of prominent Dorjis ==
- Raja Ugyen Dorji, Gongzim (Chief Minister) 1907–1917
- Raja Sonam Topgay Dorji, Gongzim (Chief Minister) 1917–1952
  - Ugyen Rimpoche, lama and son of Topgay Dorji
- Jigme Palden Dorji, Lyonchen (Prime Minister) 1952–1964
- Lhendup Dorji, Acting Lyonchen (Prime Minister) July–November 1964

== See also ==
- Politics of Bhutan
- House of Wangchuck
- Bhutan House
