= Bhutan–India relations =

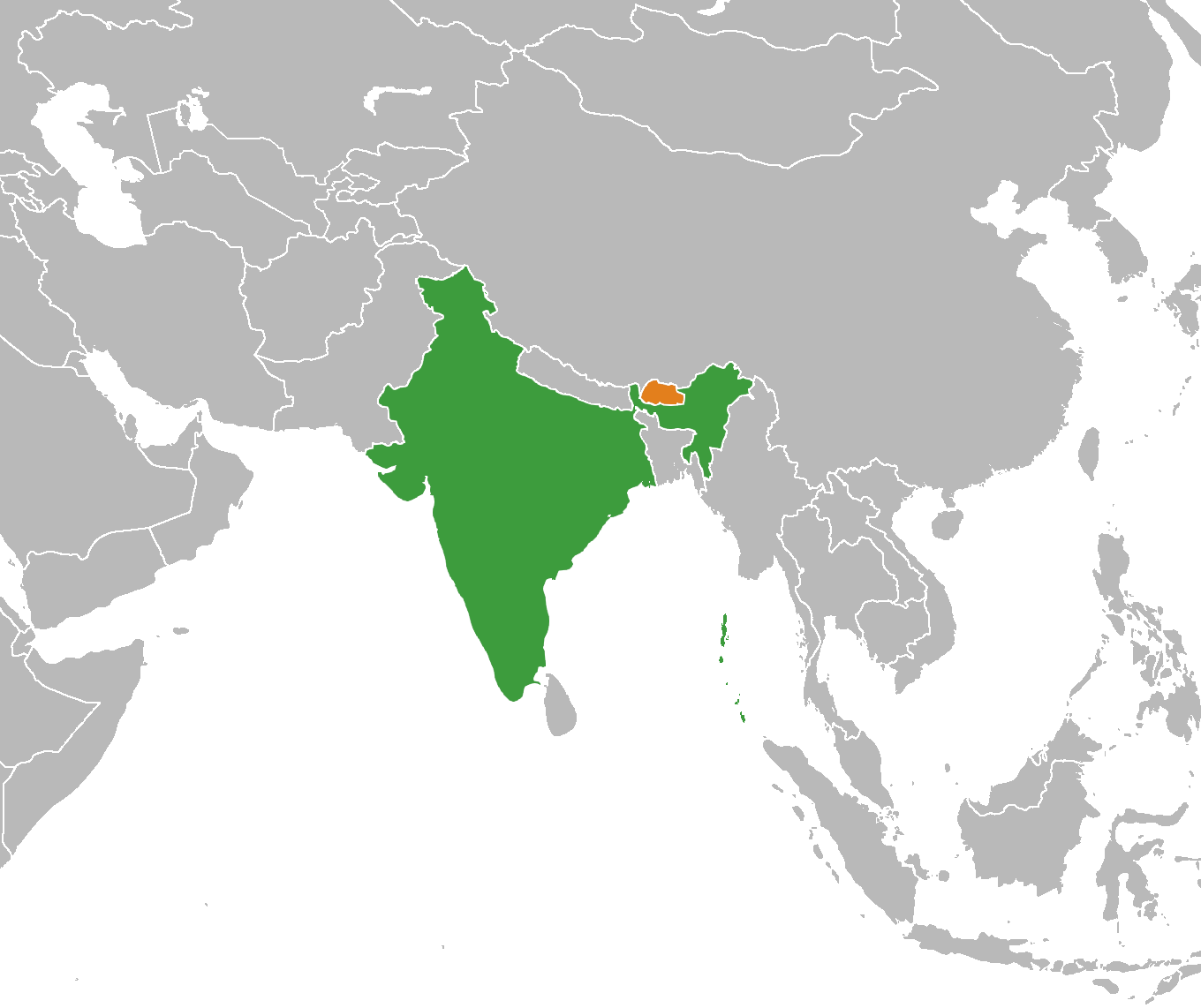
- India: Bhutan

Diplomatic mission
- Royal Bhutanese Embassy, New Delhi: Embassy of India, Thimphu

Envoy
- Ambassador Vetsop Namgyel: Ambassador Sandeep Arya

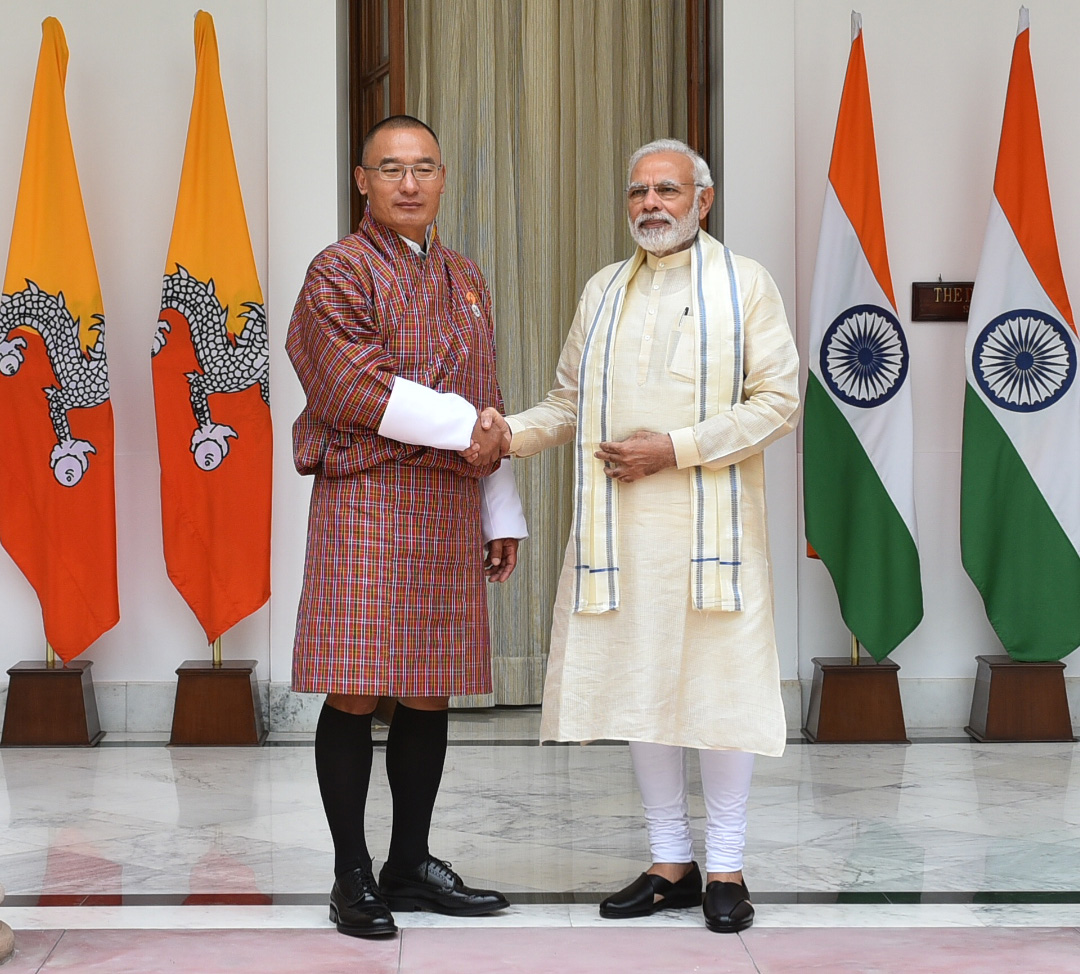
The Prime Minister of India, Narendra Modi, meeting the Prime Minister of Bhutan, Tshering Tobgay, at the Hyderabad House in New Delhi on 6 July 2018

The bilateral relations between the Kingdom of Bhutan and the Republic of India have been close. Until 2011, Bhutan was a protected state of India under the former Indo-Bhutan Treaty of Friendship, which was a continuation of the treaty first signed between British India and Bhutan. Bhutan is the largest beneficiary of India's foreign aid.

== Background ==
Following the Chinese expedition to Tibet in 1910, Bhutan became a protectorate of the British Raj, signing a treaty allowing British India to "guide" its foreign affairs. Bhutan was one of the first to recognize India's independence in 1947. Bhutan and India signed a Treaty of Friendship in 1949, which was a continuation of a treaty first signed between British India and Bhutan. Their importance was augmented by the 1950 annexation of Tibet by the People's Republic of China and China's border claims on both Bhutan and India. India shares a 605 kilometres (376 mi) border with Bhutan and is its largest trading partner, accounting for 98 percent of its exports and 90 percent of its imports.

== Military cooperation ==
A 2,000 strong Indian Military Training Team (IMTRAT) is permanently based in western Bhutan to train the Royal Bhutan Army, while other units regularly cooperate with the Royal Bhutan Army.

IMTRAT is a military training mission in western Bhutan. Its primary role is training the personnel of the Royal Bhutan Army (RBA). It does not serve as a combat force and does not conduct operational deployments. Bhutan's border defense, internal security, and combat operations fall under the Royal Bhutan Army. During actual military engagements on Bhutanese soil, such as the 2003 Operation All Clear against Indian militant in southern Bhutan, combat operations were executed exclusively by the Royal Bhutan Army (RBA).

== 1949 treaty ==
On 9 August 1949, Bhutan and India had signed the Treaty of Friendship, calling for peace between the two nations and non-interference in each other's internal affairs. However, Bhutan agreed to let India "guide" its foreign policy and both countries would consult each other closely on foreign affairs. The treaty also established free trade and extradition protocols. Scholars regard the effect of the treaty is to make Bhutan into a protected state, but not a protectorate, because Bhutan continues to have the power to conduct its own foreign policy.

The annexation of Tibet by Communist China brought both countries even closer. In 1958, the then-Indian Prime Minister Jawaharlal Nehru visited Bhutan and reiterated India's support for Bhutan's independence and later declared in the Indian Parliament that any aggression against Bhutan would be seen as aggression against India, prompting the Prime Minister of Bhutan, Jigme Palden Dorji, to object immediately to the framing of Nehru's remarks. Speaking in New Delhi shortly afterward, he clarified that Bhutan was not a protectorate of India and that the 1949 Treaty of Friendship did not contain any mutual defense clause and does not place Bhutan's national defense under India. While Jigme Palden Dorji was the one who made the public statement, he was acting as the head of government and chief diplomat under the command of His Majesty the Third King, Jigme Dorji Wangchuck.

During the 1962 Sino-Indian War, Bhutan officially maintained a policy of neutrality and refused to allow Indian troops to establish permanent defensive bases on its soil.

When Indian troops crossed into Bhutanese territory during the 1962 Sino-Indian war, King Jigme Dorji Wangchuck of Bhutan lodged a formal complaint with the Indian Army. Bhutan emphasized that it was a sovereign country, refused to offer bases for Indian defensive operations, and clarified that the 1949 Indo-Bhutan Treaty was a treaty of friendship rather than a mutual defense pact.

In August 1959, there were reports in Indian media that China was seeking to "liberate" Bhutan and Sikkim. Nehru stated in the Lok Sabha that the defence of the territorial uprightness and frontiers of Bhutan was the responsibility of the Government of India, prompting the Prime Minister of Bhutan, Jigme Palden Dorji, to object immediately to the framing of Nehru's remarks. Speaking in New Delhi shortly afterward, he clarified that Bhutan was not a protectorate of India and that the 1949 Treaty of Friendship did not contain any mutual defense clause and does not place Bhutan's national defense under India. While Jigme Palden Dorji was the one who made the public statement, he was acting as the head of government and chief diplomat under the command of His Majesty the Third King, Jigme Dorji Wangchuck.

The period saw a major increase in India's economic, military and development aid to Bhutan, which had also embarked on a program of modernization to bolster its security. While India repeatedly reiterated its military support to Bhutan, the latter expressed concerns about India's ability to protect Bhutan against China while fighting a two-front war involving Pakistan. Bhutan also questioned India's ability to protect Bhutan following the 1962 Sino-Indian War, and the situation became much more complicated after India's controversial merger of the former Kingdom of Sikkim, which made Bhutan lose trust in India. Many international scholars, journalists, and critics characterize the merger as a premeditated annexation or a de facto invasion. India and Bhutan completed a detailed demarcation of their mutual border in the period between 1973 and 1984. Border demarcation talks with India generally resolved disagreements except for several small sectors, including the middle zone between Sarpang and Geylegphug and the eastern frontier with the Indian state of Arunachal Pradesh.

== Indo-Bhutanese relations since 1972 ==
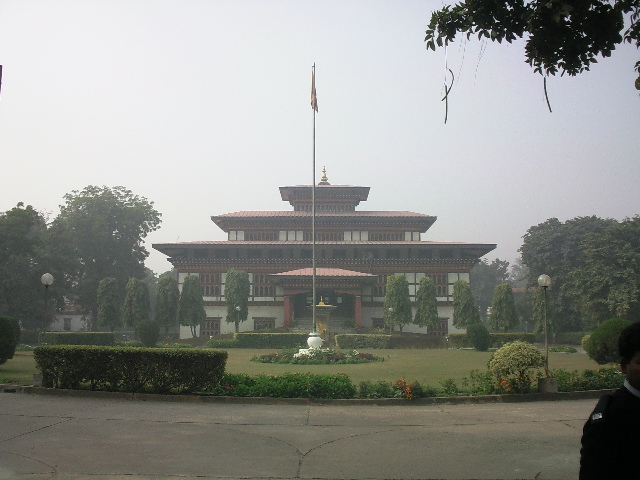
Bhutanese embassy in New Delhi

Although relations remained close and friendly, the Bhutanese government expressed a need to renegotiate parts of the treaty to enhance Bhutan's sovereignty. Bhutan began to slowly assert an independent attitude in foreign affairs by joining the United Nations in 1971, recognizing Bangladesh and signing a new trade agreement in 1972 that provided an exemption from export duties for goods from Bhutan to third countries. Bhutan exerted its independent stance at the Non-Aligned Movement (NAM) summit conference in Havana, Cuba also in 1979, by voting with China and some Southeast Asian countries rather than with India on the issue of allowing Cambodia's Khmer Rouge to be seated at the conference..From 2003 to 2004, the Royal Bhutan Army conducted operations against anti-India insurgents of the United Liberation Front of Assam (ULFA) that were operating bases in Bhutan and using its territory to carry out attacks on Indian soil.

== 2007 treaty ==
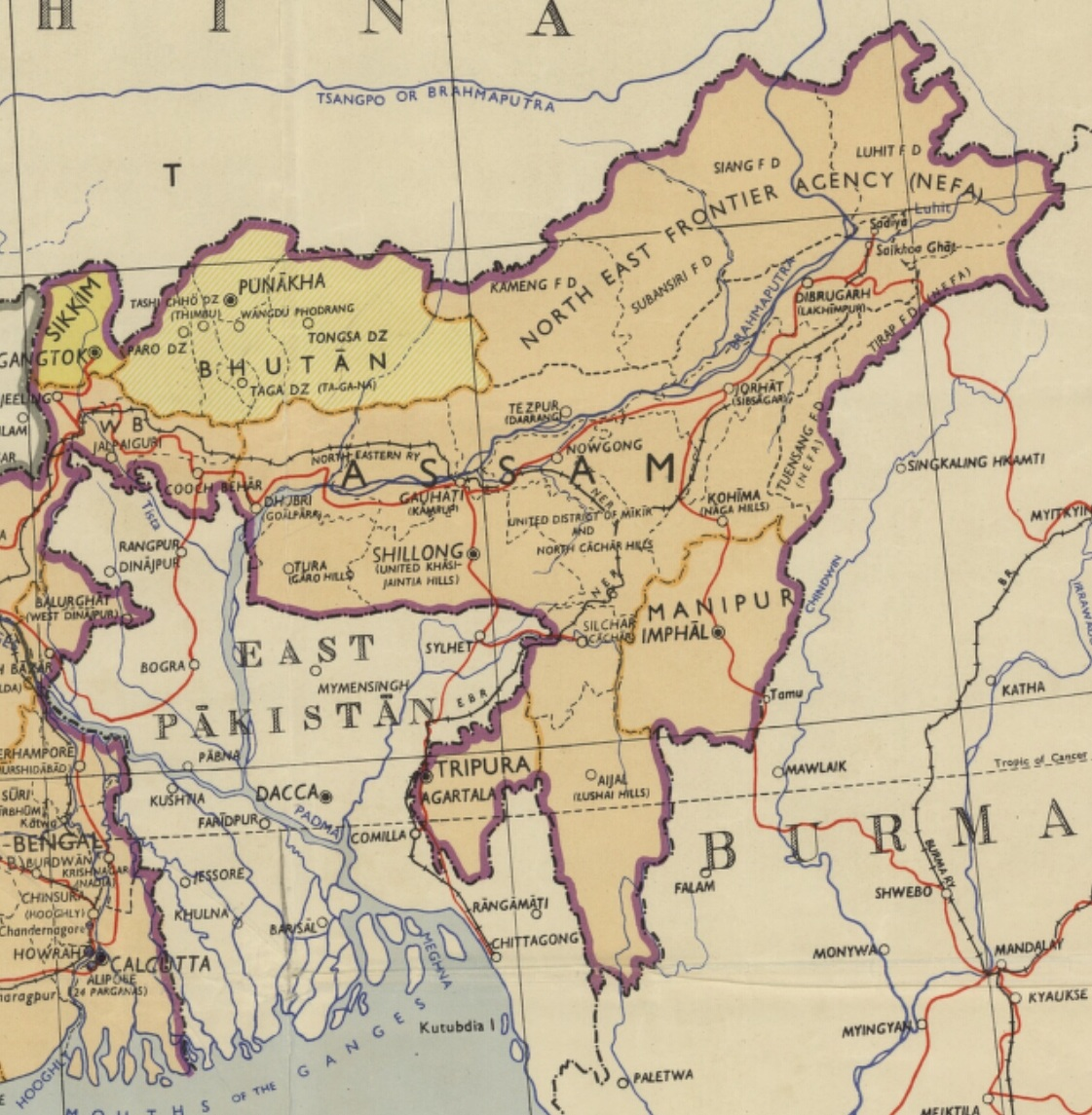
Official map of the Northeast region of India (1954), published by the Survey of India, shows Bhutan within India’s boundary as a part of India, though in a different colour due to its protected state status

India re-negotiated the 1949 treaty with Bhutan and signed a new treaty of friendship in 2007. Although this did not come into full effect immediately and required some time to be fully implemented, until then the 1949 treaty remained in force for a further period. In 2008, India's then Prime Minister Dr. Manmohan Singh visited Bhutan and expressed strong support for Bhutan's move towards democracy. India allows 16 entry and exit points for Bhutanese trade with other countries (the only exception being China) and has agreed to develop and import a minimum of 10,000 megawatts of electricity from Bhutan by 2021.

On 1 January 2011, the new friendship treaty came into effect, removing India’s role in guiding Bhutan’s foreign policy and ending Bhutan’s status as an Indian protected state, thereby making Bhutan independent of India and Indian suzerainty. The coming into force of the new treaty also removed the requirement for Bhutan to obtain India’s permission for arms imports. Subsequently, official Indian maps stopped showing Bhutan as part of India, like other states, and instead started representing it as a separate country, from this date.

== Support ==
In 2012–13 fiscal, India's budgetary support to the Kingdom country stood at US$600 million (around ₹30 billion). It steadily rose over the years to reach US$985 million (₹61.60 billion) in 2015–16 making Bhutan the largest beneficiary of India's foreign aid.

Bhutan's Prime Minister, Tshering Tobgay, requested an additional aid package from India worth ₹54 billion (US$819 million, as per the exchange rates at the time of signing the deal) for his nation during his visit to New Delhi in August 2013. Five-sixths of this amount (₹45 billion) has been earmarked for Bhutan's 11th Five-Year plan. ₹4 billion was for the pending projects of the previous plan period. The remaining ₹5 billion was part of India's "Economic stimulus package" for Bhutan's slowing economy.

India operates three hydro power projects, of 1,416 MW in Bhutan and three more of 2,129 MW are under construction. The third Prime Minister of Bhutan Lotay Tshering secured an aid package of about Nu.45 billion (about $635 million) for the 12th five-year plan in his first overseas visit to India in November 2018. During this meeting the tariff rate for the Mangdechhu Hydropower Project plant was also brought under discussion where Lotay Tshering tried to raise the rate to Nu.4.27 but it ended more towards the Indian Government's negotiation price of Nu.4.1. The revised tariff rate for the plant was then settled at Nu.4.12. The government of Bhutan also received Nu.4 billion for trade facilitation and boosting economic linkages.

== In 21st century ==
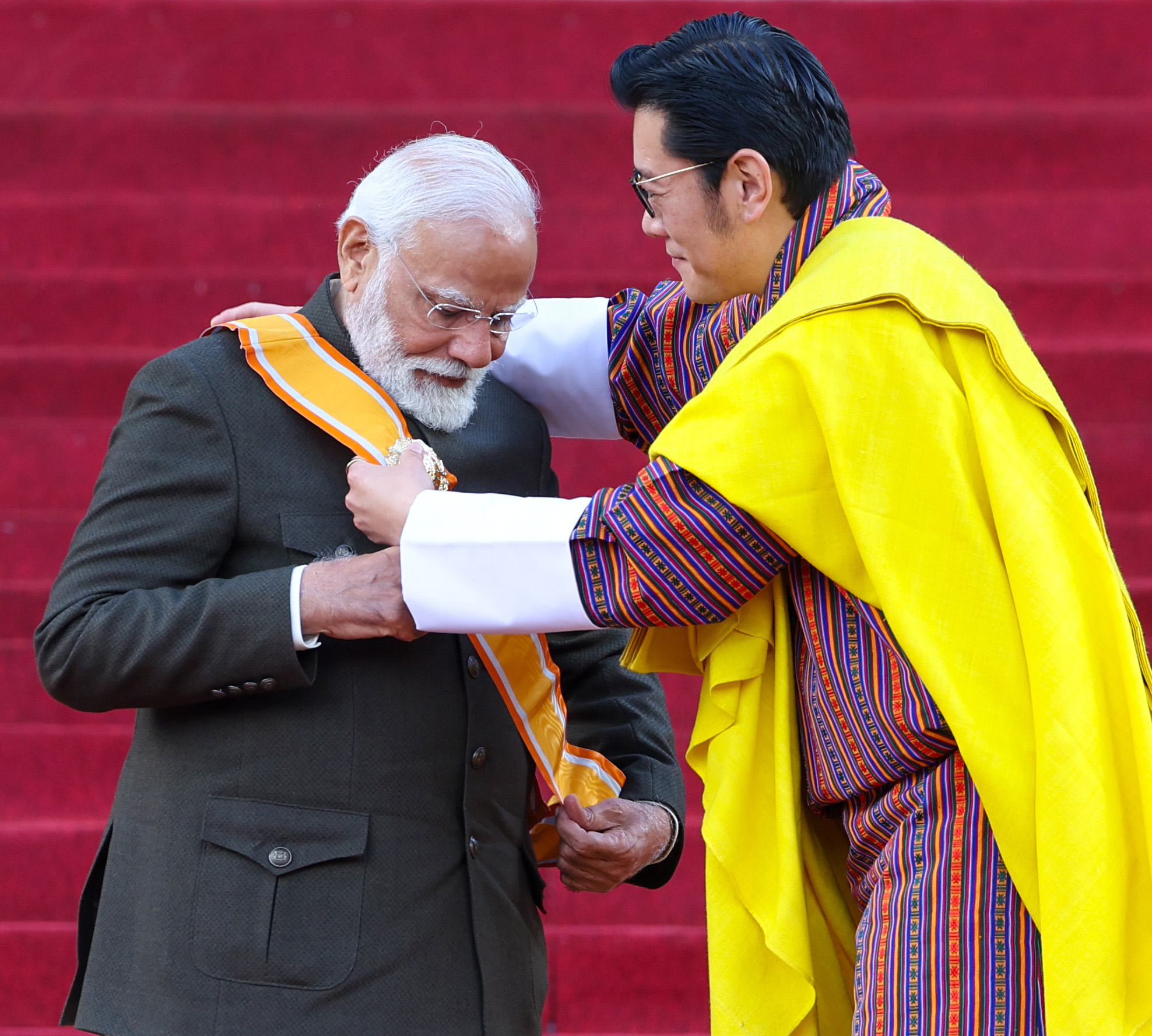
Prime Minister Modi being conferred with the 'Order of the Dragon King' - Bhutan's highest civilian decoration by the King of Bhutan

At the 2012 Rio+20 Summit, Bhutan announced that it would be the first country to switch its agricultural sector to organic production. This, and Bhutanese prime minister Jigme Thinley's contact with Chinese premier Wen Jiabo, alarmed India and led them to retaliate. India cut its subsidies on bottled natural gas exports to Bhutan, leading to shortages before Bhutan's upcoming elections. Thinley lost the subsequent election, marking the first change in power in the history of Bhutanese democracy.

Indian Prime Minister Narendra Modi chose Bhutan as his first foreign destination. Modi inaugurated the Supreme Court Complex in Bhutan and also promised help to Bhutan on the IT and digital sectors.

This visit followed an invitation by King Jigme Khesar Namgyel Wangchuck and Tobgay. The visit was called by the media as a "charm offensive" that would also seek to check Bhutan–China relations that had recently been formalized. He also sought to build business ties, including a hydro-electric deal, and inaugurated the India-funded Supreme Court of Bhutan building. While talking about the visit, Modi said that Bhutan was a "natural choice" for his first foreign destination because of the "unique and special relationship" the two countries shared. He added that he was looking forward to nurture and further strengthen India's special relations with Bhutan. His entourage included Foreign Minister Sushma Swaraj, National Security Advisor Ajit Doval and Foreign Secretary Sujatha Singh. He was further set to discuss the insurgency in Northeast India, and China.

In 2024, the King of Bhutan conferred Prime Minister Modi with the Order of the Dragon King, the highest decoration of Bhutan. It was the first such award to a non-Bhutanese.

== Cultural relations ==
=== Sports ===
Bhutan was introduced to kho kho, a traditional game of India, in 2019. Bhutan later competed in the inaugural 2025 Kho Kho World Cup in India.

=== Place of worship ===
In 2025, Bhutanese style Buddhist temple called Royal Bhutan Buddhist Temple was constructed by the Bhutan government in Rajgir in Bihar.

== See also ==
- Bhutan House
- Bhutan's relations with Northeast India
- Foreign relations of Bhutan
- Foreign relations of India
- South Asian Association for Regional Cooperation (SAARC)
