= Mayeum Choying Wangmo Dorji =

Bhutanese politician (1897–1994)

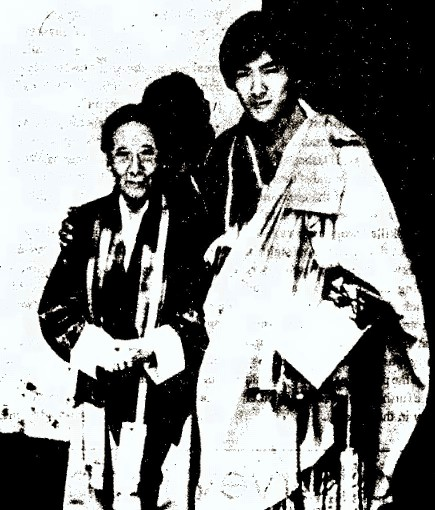
- Mayeum Choying Wangmo Dorji and the king Jigme Singye Wangchuck (her grandson) in 1979
- Born: 1897; Gangtok, Kingdom of Sikkim
- Died: March 26, 1994 (aged 97); Bhutan House, Kalimpong, India
- Spouse(s): Gonzim Sonam Topgay Dorji (m. 1918–1953; his death)
- Children: 5, including Kesang Choden
- Parent(s): Chogyal Thutob Namgyal (father); Yeshay Dolma (mother)

Rani Mayeum Choying Wangmo Dorji (Dzongkha: མ་ཡུམ་ཆོས་དབྱིངས་དབང་མོ་རྡོ་རྗེ, Wylie: ma-yum chos-dbyings dbang-mo rdo-rje), often called Rani Chuni, was the mother of Queen Grandmother Ashi Kesang Choden of Bhutan. She was Choying Wangmo Dorji by her marriage. She is best known for designing the Flag of Bhutan. She died in 1994.

== Work ==
Mayeum Choying Wangmo Dorji designed the first Bhutan flag with the senior members of the monastic clergy of the Zhung Dratshang (Central Monastic Body): Bhutan had been invited to attend the first Asian conference in New Delhi on March 23, 1947, and a flag representing Bhutan was necessitated for the occasion. Mayeum Choying Wangmo Dorji and Bhutan's late prime minister, Lyonchen Jigme Palden Dorji (her son), represented Bhutan at the conference.

She was deeply religious and would donate large amounts of money and offered many personal sacred reliquaries to build temples and monasteries in Bhutan. She was involved with the translation of the History of Sikkim by Gyalmo Yeshay Dolma (her mother) as well as several other works with scholars such as Gendun Chophel, Barmoik Athing and so on.

She was formerly the Jetsunma of Phensang Monastery in Sikkim. Her modern education was privately tutored, and her wedding took place at Bhutan House, Kalimpong, on 5 April 1918.

== Patronages ==
- President of the Sikkim Education Board.
- Vice-President of Sikkim Research Institute of Tibetology General Council [SRIT] (1964–1965).

== Ancestry ==
Ancestors of Mayeum Choying Wangmo Dorji

16. Phuntsog Namgyal, 5th Maharaja of Sikkim
8. Tenzing Namgyal, 6th Maharaja of Sikkim
17. a daughter of Deba Shamsher Khiti Phukpa
4. Tsugphud Namgyal, 7th Maharaja of Sikkim
18. Chandzod Karwang
9. Anyo Karwang
2. Sir Thutob Namgyal, 9th Maharaja of Sikkim
5. Maharani Menchi
1. Mayeum Choying Wangmo Dorji
6. Shiafe Uthok, of the Lhading House of Lhasa
3. Yeshay Dolma
