= Bhutan House =

- Location within West Bengal

General information
- Type: Dzong/Palace
- Location: Kalimpong, West Bengal, India
- Coordinates: 27.078184°N 88.488377°E
- Current tenants: Queen Mother Ashi Kesang Choden Wangchuck
- Completed: 1912; 114 years ago
- Owner: Dorji family

Technical details
- Floor count: 2

Other information
- Number of rooms: 12+

Bhutan House is an estate located in Kalimpong, West Bengal, India, owned by the Dorji family of Bhutan. The site is the traditional administrative Dzong for southern Bhutan, and also functioned as the administrative center for the whole of western Bhutan during the modern kingdom's early years of consolidation. It represented the relationship between Bhutan and British India, and is a modern symbol of Bhutan–India relations.

It is the home of Queen Grandmother Ashi Kesang Choden Wangchuck, the grandmother of the current Bhutanese king, Druk Gyalpo Jigme Khesar Namgyal Wangchuck.

== Building and grounds ==
Located in Kalimpong, the estate is on Rishi Road, leaving town, between the 10th and 12th miles, just before its fork. The property has fencing and a driveway toward the stone double-storied Victorian-style complex. The landscaped lawns feature a small stupa containing the ashes of Ayi Thubten Wongmo and a white chorten commemorating the late Rani Chuni. Bhutan House overlooks the Relli River below a deep valley.

The interior is of dark wood. The first floor contains a sitting room for guests and the dining room. Upstairs are the bedrooms and family altar room. The room of the late Rani Chuni is kept as originally furnished with Bhutanese chodems (carved tables), woven materials, books, and other artifacts.

In total, the main house contains over a dozen rooms, including a long hall on each floor. The detached kitchen is also two-storied, connected to the main structure by a small bridge. A lhakhang (Buddhist temple) is also located on the premises.

== History ==
The land that was to become Bhutan House was ceded from Bhutan to British India in 1865 at the conclusion the Bhutan War and as a condition of the Treaty of Sinchula. The land became a subdivision of Darjeeling in 1916, and became part of a hill station.

In 1910, Sikkim Political Officer and Tibetologist Sir Charles Alfred Bell engaged Bhutan and signed the Treaty of Punakha and other agreements that had the effect of assigning land in Motithang (Thimphu) and a hill station between Chukha and Thimphu to the British, assigning a portion of Kalimpong to Bhutan, and doubling the per annum subsidy from Britain to Bhutan. Bhutan House itself was reportedly constructed by the Dorjis especially to host the Thirteenth Dalai Lama. The grounds were consecrated by Chogley Yeshey Ngodrup on his return from a pilgrimage to Bodh Gaya.

=== The Dorji family ===
The powerful Dorji family became prominent through their ties to the Wangchuck family and to the British. Kazi Dorji had advised the future First King to mediate between the British and Tibet, and it was Kazi Dorji who was later responsible for the large-scale induction of Nepalis into Bhutan. During the early years of the Dorji family's prominence, members of the family served as gongzim (chief chamberlain, the top government post), and their official residence was at the palatial Bhutan House.

Kazi Ugyen Dorji settled the land and took advantage of the lucrative trade routes through Kalimpong, and by 1898 assumed the roles of Trade Agent and mediator between the British Empire and Tibet. The estate, which contained notable stables, contributed significantly to the development of the community and commerce in Kalimpong.

From Bhutan House, Raja Sonam Topgay Dorji ("Topgay Raja") held the post of Trade Agent to the Government of Bhutan, however he functioned to a large extent as prime minister, foreign minister, and ambassador to India. Through this position as a trade intermediary, the Dorji family amassed wealth reputedly greater than that of the royal family. Topgay Raja himself married a Sikkimese princess, fathering Jigme Palden Dorji, future Prime Minister. Another of Topgay Dorji's sons, Ugyen, was recognized as a lama at Bhutan House as a young boy.

Bhutan House was where Raja Sonam Topgay Dorji (CIE) lived. From here, Sonam Topgay Dorji was Agent for Foreign Relations for the Royal Government, as well as Governor of Haa (1917-1924), directly abutting the estate. It was also at Bhutan House that Sonam Topgay Dorji died suddenly in September 1953. The event seemed to symbolize a dark cloud of misfortune for the Dorji family, which they believed to be a curse.

After two generations of growing influence, the sister of Prime Minister Jigme Palden Dorji – the daughter of Topgay Raja – married the Third King of Bhutan, creating a new bond so prominent as to cause some discontent among other Bhutanese families. The public was divided between pro-modernist and pro-monarchist camps.

== Foreign affairs ==
Because of the influence of the Dorji family and its members' fluency in English, Bhutan House was the sole outlet for communication between the government and the outside world. Topgay's professional and personal contacts with India as it gained independence from the British Empire proved invaluable to Bhutan as it sought to modernize and develop.

Bhutan House was naturally the locus of social engagement between Bhutan and its Sikkimese – and later Indian – neighbors. It hosted lavish Losar parties, including Tibetan and Cham dancing.

From Bhutan House, the Dorji family supported Western education of Bhutanese youths, paving the way for educational reforms under the Third King. The estate also has its own radio station broadcast from Bhutan.

=== Tibetan connection ===
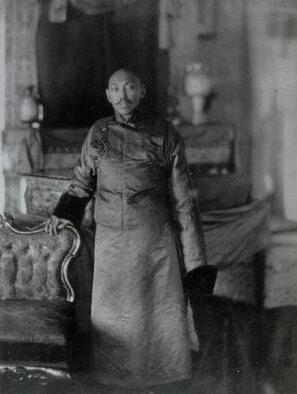
The Thirteenth Dalai Lama stayed at Bhutan House for three months.

Kalimpong has remained an important trade center and home for many Tibetan expatriates, and Bhutan House is notable among Tibetans because of its association with Dalai Lamas.

In 1912, the Thirteenth Dalai Lama, Thubten Gyatso, stayed at the newly built Bhutan House for three months as the guest of Raja Kazi Ugyen Dorji and his sister Ayi Thubten Wangmo. The Dalai Lama dubbed the edifice Migyur Ngona Phodrang ("Palace of Unchanging Delight" or "Palace of Unchanging Supreme Joy") and presented the household with gifts of altars and consecrated statuettes, as well as many precious religious and secular robes. Once the Dalai Lama returned to Tibet, he sent Bhutan House a large gilded bronze statue of himself for the attached lhakhang (temple) he dubbed Dechen Gatsal ("The Happy Garden of Great Bliss"). In return, the household had offered the Dalai Lama silver to be dedicated for the production of a statue of the Thousand-armed and Thousand-eyed Avalokiteshvara (Chenrezi Chatong Chentong) in Lhasa, which the Dalai Lama had made. After the death of his host, the Dalai Lama gave the Dorji family a kashog (decree) written on yellow silk and sealed with his great seal; the kashog expressed his gratitude for the hospitality he received at Bhutan House, and for the efforts of the Dorji family to aid the Tibetan people. Because of its association with the Dalai Lama, Bhutan House is still known among Tibetans as Migyur Ngonga Phodrang.

In 1957, the current Fourteenth Dalai Lama also stayed at Bhutan House for a week during his stay in India after meeting with Prime Minister Jawaharlal Nehru.

== See also ==
- Dorji family
- House of Wangchuck
- History of Bhutan
