= Tsento Gewog =

Gewog of Paro District, Bhutan

Tsento Gewog བཙན་ཏོ་
- Gewog
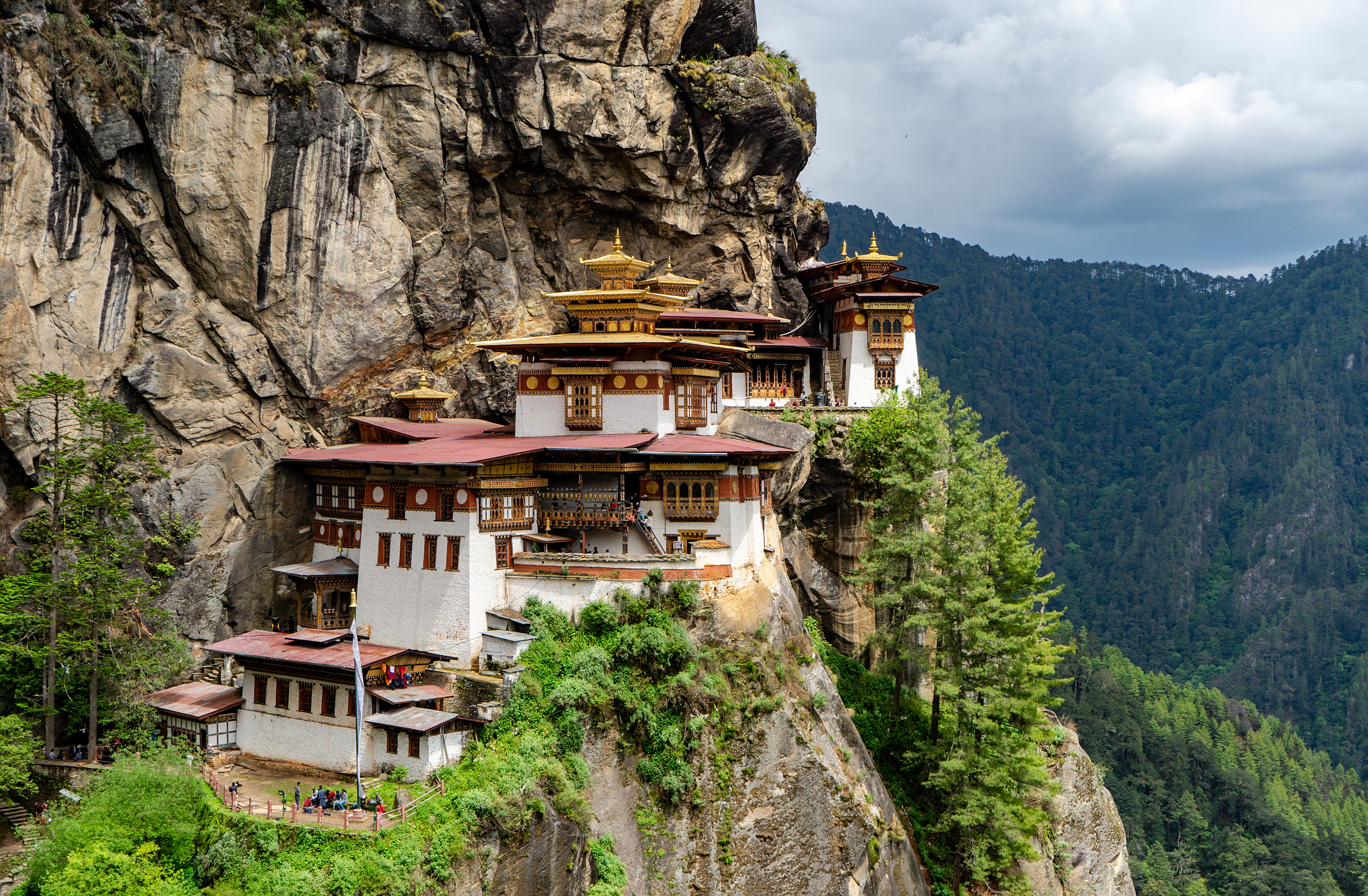
- Taktsang Palphug Monastery

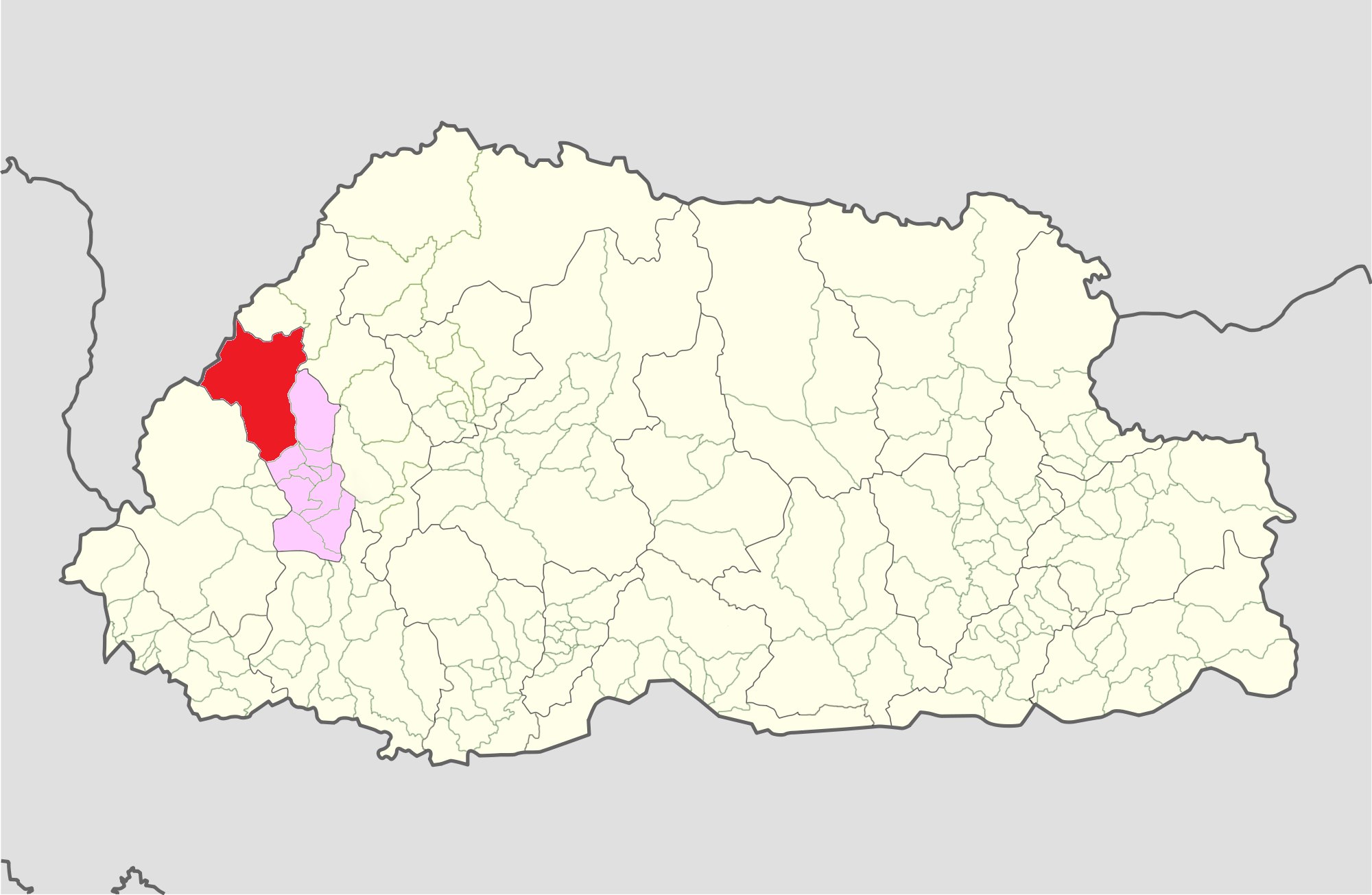
- Tsento Gewog (red) in Paro District (pink)
- Country: Bhutan
- District: Paro

Area
  - Total: 575 km^{2} (222 sq mi)

Population (2018)
  - Total: 5,253
  - Density: 9.14/km^{2} (23.7/sq mi)
- Time zone: UTC+6 (BTT)

Tsento Gewog (Dzongkha: བཙན་ཏོ་) is a gewog (village block) of Paro District, Bhutan. There are 5,253 people living in 21 villages and 487 households in the gewog, as of 2018. The Taktsang Palphug Monastery, also known as the Paro Taktsang or the Tiger's Nest, is a popular tourist attraction in Tsento Gewog, and one of the country's most visited.

== Geography ==
Tsento Gewog is a gewog of the Paro District of Bhutan. A gewog is a village block and a second-level administrative division of Bhutan below districts.

Covering an area of 575 square kilometres, Tsento Gewog contains 5 chiwogs (electoral precincts), 21 villages, and 487 households. It is situated at an altitude of 2,000 to 5,210 metres above sea level, in the north of Paro District. It has a cool to extreme cold climate, with an annual temperature range of 4–17 °C (39–63 °F) and an annual rainfall of 280 milimetres.

A secret road/trail connecting Phari in China (27.698912°N 89.189139°E) known as Tremo La is the only connection between Bhutan and China.

== Demographics ==
As of 2018, the population of Tsento Gewog was 5,253. Of the residents, 3,171 were men and 2,082 were women. Additionally, 319 were designated as special needs.

== Education ==
Tsento Gewog has five educational institutions: Drukgyel Lower Secondary School, Drukgyel Higher Secondary School, Ramtsekha Community School, Gunitsawa Community School, and the Wangsel Institute.

== Economy ==
=== Agriculture ===
Organic farming of fruits and vegetables is a growing sector in Tsento Gewog.

=== Tourism ===
Tsento Gewog is one of the most visited gewogs of Bhutan because it is the location of the country's most famous heritage site, the Taktsang Palphug Monastery, also known as the Paro Taktsang or the Tiger's Nest. Tsento Gewog was historically a small farming community, but the Bhutanese king's decision to open up his country to foreign visitors in 1974 gradually transformed the area into a tourist hotspot.
