= Duar War =

War fought between British India and Bhutan in 1864–1865

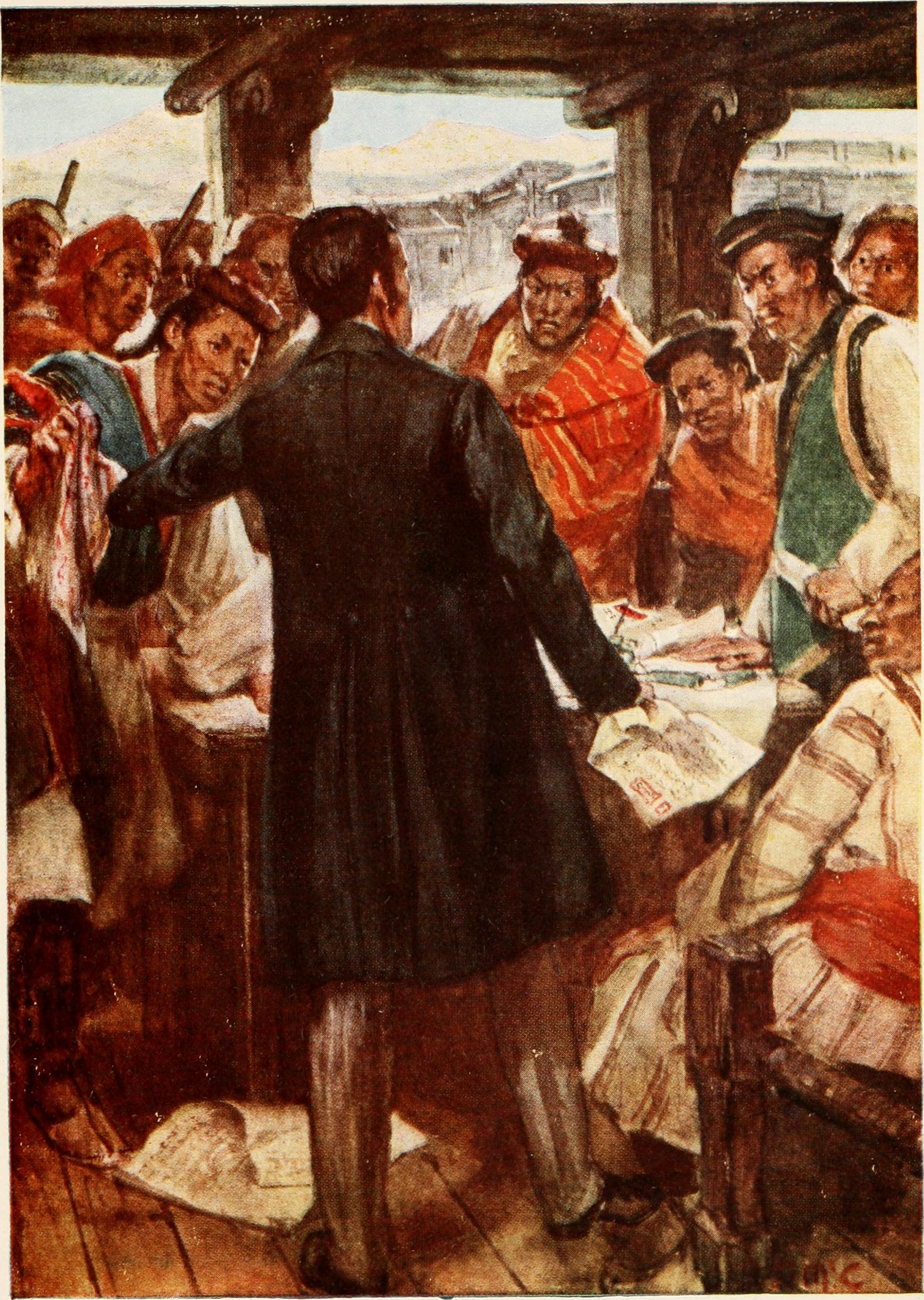
- Ashley Eden forced by the Bhutanese to sign a Treaty, 1864. Illustration by A.D. Macromick (1909)
Date	1864–1865
Location	The Koch Hajo and Koch Behar Duars
Result	British Indian victory
Territorial changes	Bhutan ceded parts of the Assam Duars, Koch Behar Duars and Dewangiri to British India

Belligerents
United Kingdom: India	Bhutan

Commanders and leaders
(British Raj) Sir John Lawrence	Kagyud Wangchuk (1864); Tshewang Sithub (1865)

Strength
3,600 to 3,800 troops	2,000 to 3,000 (Dzong guards)

Casualties and losses
40 killed in action and 100 to 150 wounded	100 to 200

The Duar War (or Anglo-Bhutanese War) was a war fought between British India and Bhutan in 1864 to 1865. It was the only military conflict between the two states since 1774 and resulted in Bhutan losing a fifth of its territory.

== Background ==
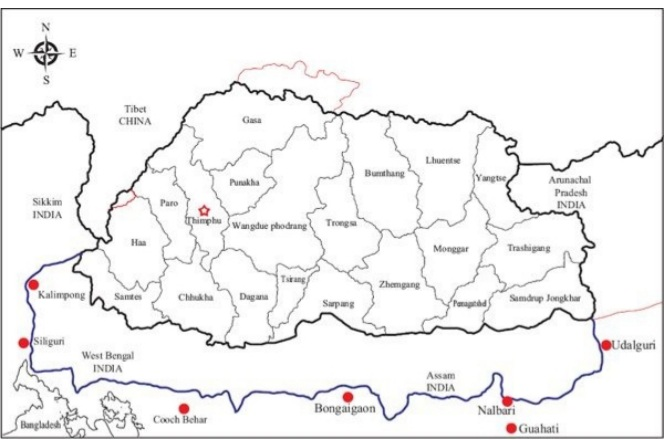
Southern Boundary of Bhutan in blue before the Duar War of 1865

In 1862, the Bhutanese raided British occupied Sikkim (which had only been controlled since the year prior) and Cooch Behar (Koch Bihar). After the raids in Assam, the British requested compensation by extraditing the Bhutanese officials responsible for the raids along with settlements of Bhutanese debt to the British, but Bhutan declined to protect their independence. In 1841, Britain proceeded to annex the Assam Duars from Bhutan, but paying 10,000 Rupees to Bhutan annually as compensation. Later, they also ceded the Bengal Duars as they were giving them a hard time. After the raids in 1862, the British withheld said compensation payments and demanded that all captives from British India held hostage by the raiders be set free and stolen properties to be returned. The Druk Desi once more denied, claiming that he was unaware of the raids.

Across the nineteenth century, British India commissioned multiple missions to Bhutan. Official documents always cited cross-border raids by Bhutan or sheltering of dissidents as the immediate cause; however, modern historians note Britain's imperialist ambitions in the region to be the actual pretext. Not only was Bhutan a vital cog in the Indo-Tibetan trade but also the commercial viability of Duars region for supporting tea plantations was well known among Company officials. In 1863, British Indian government sent a mission under Ashley Eden to Punakha, the capital of Bhutan at the time. His job was to get all captives released and arrange peaceful economical policy and intercourse with Bhutan. In January, he left Darjeeling, West Bengal, crossed the Teesta River to arrive in Punakha. However, as soon as he arrived in the suburbs, he was met with evasion and constant delay from authorities. It only got worse from there, as his arrival to Punakha kicked off with threats from the government and tense compulsion to sign an 'obnoxious' treaty. On his way back to India in April, he was disavowed and repudiated by the Bhutanese.

The dzongpon of Punakha – who had emerged victorious in the civil war – had broken with the central government and set up a rival Druk Desi while the legitimate druk desi sought the protection of the penlop of Paro and was later deposed. The British mission dealt alternately with the rival penlop of Paro and the penlop of Trongsa (the latter acted on behalf of the druk desi).

== War ==
As Bhutan did not comply, the British organized four columns of British, Indian, and 3rd and 8th rifles (Gurkha), in what was known as the Duar Field Forces. In the same year, these forces marched up into the Bhutanese foothills, met by heavy rains and swamps. The column in the east went up to the fort Dewangiri, called Deothang under the Bhutanese, and captured it before suffering a humiliating defeat to the Bhutanese armed with swords, bows, and matchlocks, who, after taking the fort, seized two Howitzers. Then, after cutting off the water supply in the fort and the occupied east post, left. They did not beat the column, but rather the fortress was abandoned by them at the sight of Bhutanese militias.

The defeat was avenged after the late Major-general or commander Henry Tombs arrived and recaptured the fort with support from the 55th Regiment of Foot (Colonel Robert Humes). The center column advanced into the hills before capturing Buxa Fort. The 3rd column had also assaulted and captured Dalimkote fort, which was a treacherous journey involving dense jungles to heights possibly reaching 5,000 feet. In its foothills was the secluded village of Ambiokh, where a barrel of gunpowder exploded as several men and a battery of heavy artillery crossed, tragically taking the life of Captain F.C Griffin, his lieutenants E. Walker and E.A. Anderson, and 6 gunners. Griffin was in command of the battery and as he was along with others carrying it, many were also wounded. Luckily, these small advancements by themselves put many constraints on Bhutanese commerce. Bhutan had no regular army, and what forces existed were composed of dzong guards armed with matchlocks, bows and arrows, swords, knives, and catapults. Some of these dzong guards, carrying shields and wearing chainmail armor, engaged the well-equipped British forces. Soon, many attacks made by the British from expeditionary divisions sent from Calcutta (now Kolkata) were successful, with varying fortune. From the 44th (Sylhet) Regiment Bengal Native Infantry, soldiers had help solidify the fort at Deothang to stop the constant Bhutanese attacks. Then, all operations were suspended for the summer. Later, Viceroy Lord Lawrence decided to negotiate a resolution for the war to put an end to the break. So, on June 2, 1865, he wrote to the Deb and Dharma Rajas, proposing peace based on the British proclamations in 1864. The Bhutanese declined the offer, so the British marched into Bhutan to give the Deb Raja full notice directly, led by Colonel Herbert Bruce, dated September 28, 1865. The Deb Raja later sent a letter on October 4, 1865, consenting to the negotiation of terms. It was quite late as per extensive war preparations. In the end, a treaty was devised on 11 November 1865, known as the Treaty of Sinchula.

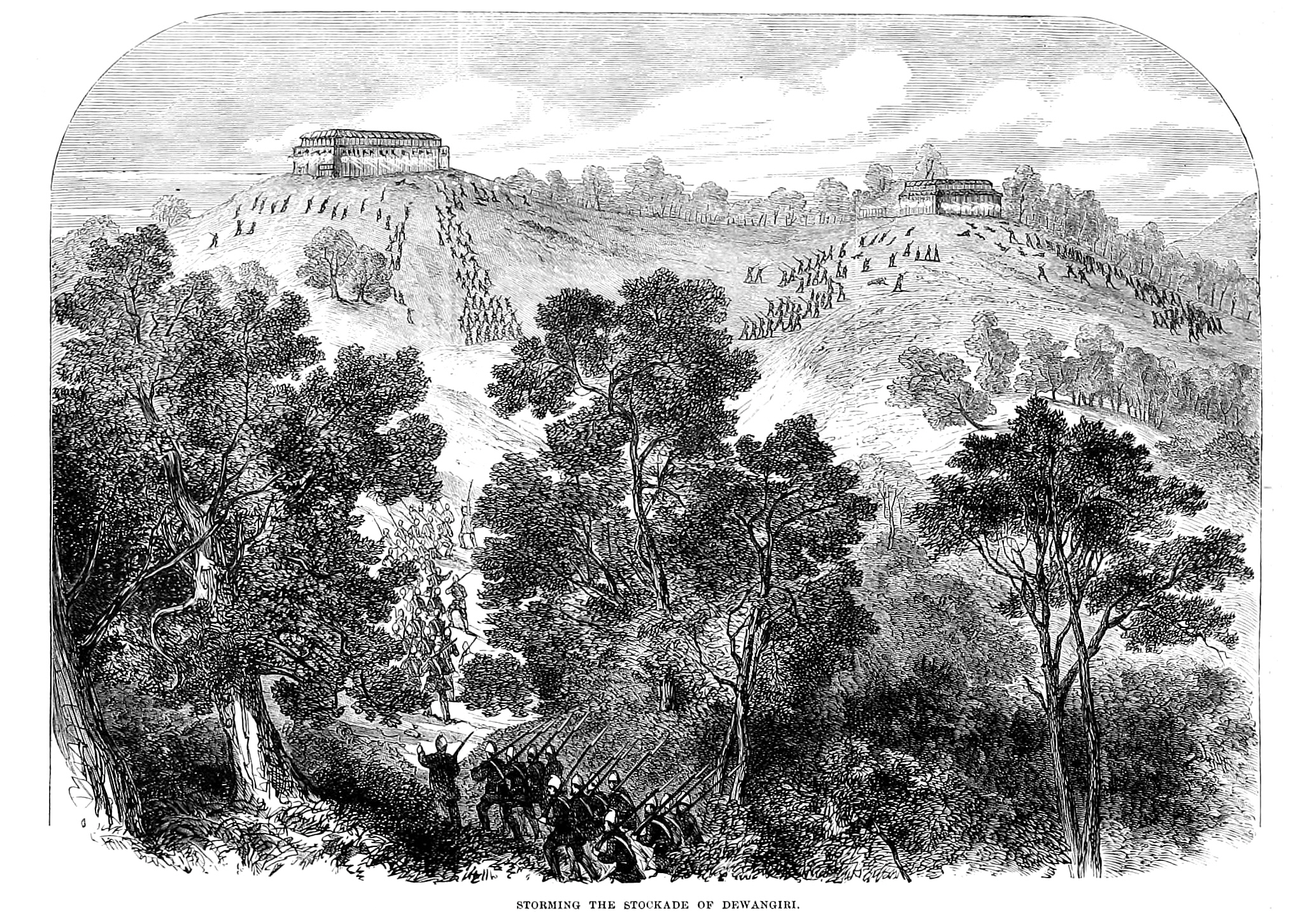
Storming of Dewangiri fort.

The Duar War lasted only five months and, despite some battlefield victories by Bhutanese forces which included the capture of two howitzer guns, resulted in the loss of 20% of Bhutan's territory, and forced cession of formerly occupied territories. Under the terms of the Treaty of Sinchula, signed 11 November 1865, Bhutan ceded territories in the Assam Duars and Bengal Duars, as well as the 83 km^{2} of territory of Dewangiri in southeastern Bhutan, in return for an annual subsidy of 50,000 rupees. The Treaty of Sinchula stood until 1910, when Bhutan and British India signed the Treaty of Punakha, effective until 1947.

== Treaty of Sinchula ==
Treaty of Sinchula
- Signed: 11 November 1865; 160 years ago
- Location: Sinchula
- Effective: 11 November 1865
- Condition: Bhutanese cessation of withdrawal of claims to suzerainty of Cooch Behar and the Duars
- Expiration: 1910
- Signatories: Sikkim Political Officer Herbert Bruce; The Druk Desi and his ministers
- Parties: British India; Bhutan
- Ratifiers: Viceroy and Governor-General Sir John Lawrence (British India)
- Language: English

Below appears the text of the Treaty of Sinchula.

On the 11th day of November, 1865

Treaty between His Excellency the Right Honourable Sir John Lawrence, G.C.B., K.C.S.I., Viceroy and Governor-General of Her Britannic Majesty's possessions in the East Indies, and the one part by Lieutenant Colonel Herbert Bruce, CB, by virtue of full powers to that effect vested in him by the Viceroy and Governor – General, and on the other part by Samdojey Deb Jimpey and Themseyrensey Donai according to full powers conferred on them by the Dhum and Deb Rajahs, 1865.

ARTICLE I There shall henceforth be perpetual peace and friendship between the British Government and the Government of Bhutan.

ARTICLE II Whereas in consequence of repeated aggressions of the Bhutan Government and of the refusal of that Government to afford satisfaction for those aggressions, and for their insulting treatment of the officers sent by His Excellency the Governor-General in Council for the purpose of procuring an amicable adjustment of differences existing between the two states, the British Government has been compelled to seize by an armed force the whole of the Doars and certain Hill Posts protecting the passes into Bhutan, and whereas the Bhutan Government has now expressed its regret for past misconduct and a desire for the establishment of friendly relations with the British Government, it is hereby agreed that the whole of the tract known as the Eighteen Doars, bordering on the districts of Rungpoor, Cooch Behar, and Assam, together with the Taloo of Ambaree Fallcottah and the Hill territory on the left bank of the Teesta up to such points as may be laid down by the British Commissioner appointed for the purpose is ceded by the Bhutan Government to the British Government forever.

ARTICLE III The Bhutan Government hereby agree to surrender all British subjects, as well as subjects of the Chief of Sikkim and Cooch Behar who are now detained in Bhutan against their will, and to place no impediment in the way of the return of all or any of such persons into British territory.

ARTICLE IV In consideration of the cession by the Bhutan Government of the territories specified in Article II of this Treaty, and of the said Government having expressed its regret for past misconduct, and having hereby engaged for the future to restrain all evil disposed persons from committing crimes within British territory or the territories of the Rajahs of Sikkim and Cooch Behar and to give prompt and full redress for all such crimes which may be committed in defiance of their commands, the British Government agree to make an annual allowance to the Government of Bhutan of a sum not exceeding fifty thousand rupees (Rupees 50,000) to be paid to officers not below the rank of Jungpen, who shall be deputed by the Government of Bhutan to receive the same. And it is further hereby agreed that the payments shall be made as specified below:

On the fulfillment by the Bhutan Government of the conditions of this Treaty Twenty Five Thousand Rupees (Rupees 25,000).

On the 10th January following the 1st payment, thirty five thousand rupees (Rupees 35,000)

On the 10th January following, forty-five thousand rupees (Rupees 45,000)

On every succeeding 10th January, fifty thousand rupees (Rupees 50,000)

== See also ==
- Foreign relations of Bhutan
- History of Bhutan
- Treaty of Punakha

== Bibliography ==
- Phuntsho, Karma (2013), The History of Bhutan, Random House India, pp. 405–, ISBN 978-81-8400-411-3
- Rennie, Surgeon (1866), Bhotan and the Dooar War, John Murray – via archive.org
