= LGBTQ rights in Bhutan =

- Bhutan
- Legal status: Legal before 2004, Legal since 2021
- Gender identity: Gender marker change is allowed.
- Military: No
- Discrimination protections: Some protections based on sexual orientation and gender identity.

Family rights
- Recognition of relationships: No
- Adoption: No

Lesbian, gay, bisexual, transgender and queer (LGBTQ) rights have expanded in the 21st century, however LGBTQ+ people in Bhutan still face legal challenges that are not faced by non-LGBTQ people. Same-sex unions are not recognised, however, same-sex sexual activity was decriminalized in Bhutan on 17 February 2021 after its criminalization on 11 August 2004. Although there is no broad legal protection against discrimination, there are some legal provisions that protect sexual orientation and gender identity. Transgender people are allowed to change their gender marker.

In recent years, due to opening up more to the outside world, Bhutanese LGBTQ people have started to publicly come out and establish visible outlets for the LGBTQ community. Therefore, attitudes among the general population are changing.

== Legality of same-sex sexual activity ==
As amended in 2021, Section 213 of the Bhutan Penal Code states:

A defendant shall be guilty of the offence of unnatural sex, if the defendant engages in sexual conduct that is against the order of nature. However, homosexuality between adults shall not be considered unnatural sex.

Previously, the code said a defendant was guilty of unnatural sex "if the defendant engages in sodomy or any other sexual conduct that is against the order of nature." This law jailed LGBTQ people up to a year with fines.

Efforts to repeal the sodomy ban began in 2019, during a review of the Penal Code. In December 2020, the Parliament of Bhutan passed legislation decriminalizing same-sex sexual activity with 63 votes in favor and 6 abstentions. The bill was signed into law and took effect on 17 February 2021. The age of consent is set at 18 years old, regardless of gender.

=== Decriminalisation process ===
Some members of the Parliament of Bhutan had publicly called for the laws to be repealed as early as 2013.

On 29 May 2019, the Penal Code (Amendment) Bill 2019 (Dzongkha: འབྲུག་གི་ཞིས་འགེལ་ཁྲིམས་དེབ་༼འཕྲི་སྣོན༽ དཔྱད་ཡིག་ ༢༠༡༩) was introduced by the Chairperson of the Legislative Committee, MP Tshewang Lhamo (DNT), to the Parliament. At first, the removal of sections 213 and 214 was not proposed in the bill. However, the Minister of Finance, Namgay Tshering (DNT), suggested the change as a comment and said that section 213 should be changed "to keep up with the times". The Legislative Committee of the National Assembly was supportive. When the bill was referred to the Legislative Committee, it decided to take the Finance Minister's suggestion seriously, and asked him to give it in writing, which the Finance Minister agreed to do, and allowing the committee the ability to propose it as an amendment. Tshering said "My primary reason is that this section is there since 2004 but it has become so redundant and has never been enforced. It is also an eyesore for international human rights bodies.", and that the sections had become "a stain" on the country's reputation.

On 7 June 2019, the National Assembly approved the bill in a first reading. On 10 June 2019, the bill passed the second and final reading with 38 votes in favour and 1 vote against, with 5 absentations. The bill was sent to the National Council for the winter session 6 months later. On 10 February 2020, the Council approved it with amendments by 19 votes in favour and 6 abstentions. Having been amended, the bill was sent back to the lower house, which adopted it on 27 February by a vote of 34–1 with 7 abstentions, but rejected 32 of the 56 amendments proposed by the upper house. This meant that the legislation was sent to a joint committee for reviews and voted on by a joint sitting of both chambers. The joint committee convened on 7 October 2020. In December 2020, the Parliament passed the bill with 63 votes in favor and 6 abstentions in the joint sitting, decriminalizing same-sex sexual activity. The bill was signed into law by King Jigme Khesar Namgyel Wangchuck, and came into force on 17 February 2021.

== Recognition of same-sex relationship ==
Bhutan does not provide any form of legal recognition for same-sex couples.

Tashi Tsheten, director of Rainbow Bhutan, said that a marriage bill with gender-neutral pronouns was discussed during the 2018 summer parliamentary session but was deferred due to the 2018 parliamentary election. However, a progressive government was elected in that election, and Tsheten and the LGBTQ community expressed their belief that the conversation around the bill would be revived.

== Discrimination protections ==
There is no specific anti-discrimination law that offers broad legal protection based on sexual orientation or gender identity. Nevertheless, there are some legal provisions in specific laws, regulations and policies that explicitly protect LGBTI people.

- Section 40(7) of The Office of the Attorney General Act of Bhutan 2015, states that the public interest considerations for prosecution shall include cases where "The offence is motivated by hostility against a person because of his or her race, ethnicity, sexual orientation, disability, religion, political belief, age or the like."
- The Information, Communications and Media Act of Bhutan (2018) includes sexual orientation as “Sensitive Personal Data or Information”.

=== Education ===
According to the Ministry of Education and Skills Development, anti-bullying mechanism and LGBTQ inclusive procedures have been implemented across all schools.

The National Strategic Framework on Comprehensive Sexuality Education (CSE), implemented in 2021, covers sexual and reproductive health and issues of the LGBTI community. It states that is imperative that CSE programmes and activities uphold the range of cultural and social diversity to include sexual orientation. Also, that schools should be a safe environment for all one that is tolerant and accepting of diversity including for those that have different gender orientation. It acknowledges that gender stereotypes and homophobia are among the factors which make young people vulnerable with regards to their sexual and reproductive health.

The Tertiary Education Policy 2010, issued by the Ministry of Education, states that “A policy that ensures equality of opportunity such that admission to any office or appointment in the university and the admission of students to the university shall be on merit and irrespective of religion, origin, sex, sexual orientation, or race.”

The National Youth Policy issued in 2011 by the Ministry of Education, states that "The Policy promotes respect for culture and traditions, religious and ethnic backgrounds of the people and conforms to universally recognised human rights without discrimination based on gender, race/origin, age, ethnicity, creed, sexual identity, political affiliation or social status."

=== Health ===
The Code of Professional Fidelity issued in 2021 by the Bhutan Medical and Health Council protects sexual orientation.

=== Employment ===
The Ethical Code of Conduct for Contractors 2019, states that "Contractors must refrain from practicing discrimination on the basis of race, age, gender, state and country of origin, capability or sexual orientation during the implementation of all construction activities."

The Corporate Governance Guidelines for State Enterprises 2019, published by the Ministry of Finance, bans discrimination or harassment in the workplace based on sexual orientation.

=== Gender-based violence protections ===
The Standard Operating Procedure for Gender Based Violence Prevention and Response, issued in 2020 by the National Commission for Women and Children, offers broad protections for LGBTI people.

- The Right to Non-discrimination guiding principle states: "Survivors of violence should receive equal and fair treatment regardless of their age, gender, race, religion, nationality, ethnicity, sexual orientation or any other characteristic."
- Regarding LGBTQI Survivors, it states that "Case manager should be able to provide tailored, appropriate and quality case management diverse sexual orientations, gender identities and persons with diverse sex characteristics.
- While providing services to the survivors healthcare providers should "Ensure age-appropriate, culturally, and sexual orientation and gender identity sensitive care."

=== Incitement to hatred ===
- Section 8.2(i) of the Bhutan Filming Regulation 2025, states that "The tone and content of programming shall not in any way incite discrimination, hatred or violence against any individual or identifiable group based on race, national or ethnic origin, religion, gender, sexual orientation, age, disability, marital or family status, or political affiliation."

== Legal gender recognition ==
Gender marker change in legal identification documents is allowed after submitting a medical note and a supporting letter from a civil society organisation.

== Living conditions ==
Ignorance about homosexuality is common due to stereotypes in popular culture. Bhutanese culture does not share the typical Western view of heterosexuality and homosexuality. Some have referred to it as an openly bisexual society, although this is disputed. Women are more likely than men to be open about their sexual orientation. There are cultural and traditional struggles for those who seek acceptance. According to a 2016 Integrated Biological and Behavioral Surveillance (IBBS) survey, over 42% of transgender women and 23% of gay and bisexual men in Bhutan had attempted suicide more than once. The survey also found that transgender women and gay and bisexual men were often victims of "extreme physical and sexual violence". According to a 2019 study conducted to see how sections 213 and 214 affected the community, 69% of the respondents felt the two clauses impacted them negatively.

In 2013, the introduction of Facebook led to increased visibility for the LGBTQ community with the creation of dedicated Facebook groups. In 2014, Rainbow Bhutan was set up as a community for LGBTQ people with five members; this grew to 136 members in 2019. In 2019, LGBTQ activist Tashi Tsheten said that the full LGBTQ movement started from 2015 onwards when the community started organising programmes on HIV. In 2017, LGBTQ groups began advocating outside of the scope of HIV/AIDS and began working more in the open. In 2015, activist and physiotherapist Passang Dorji came out as gay for the first time on national television. In February 2015, Karma Dupchen, a civil engineer and LGBTQ activist, created LGBTQ Bhutan, Bhutan's first ever Facebook page dedicated to spread awareness about the LGBTQ community.

Buddhism, the main religion of Bhutan, does not condemn homosexuality. In 2015, Dzongsar Khyentse Rinpoche, Bhutan's most prominent Buddhist teacher, said that sexual orientation has nothing to do with who will reach enlightenment. He further stated that Bhutanese should not merely tolerate gay people but should respect them. He said, "Your sexual orientation has nothing to do with understanding or not understanding the truth. You could be gay, you could be lesbian, you could be straight, we never know which one will get enlightened first… Tolerance is not a good thing. If you are tolerating this, it means that you think it's something wrong that you will tolerate. But you have to go beyond that – you have to respect."

The Bhutan Observer, the country's first bilingual, privately-owned newspaper, has written a significant number of articles on LGBTQ issues which elicited a lot of interest, making them the most commented articles on the paper's website. The government-supported newspaper Kuensel, meanwhile, has referred to gays as being the "Third Gender" in an article discussing HIV programmes targeted towards gay men. In November 2017, a presentation to sensibilise senior police officers on the stigmatisation faced by LGBTQ people was held in Phuentsholing. Police officials said the presentation sensitised them further and made them understand issues related to the LGBTQ community. Chief of Police Colonel Chimi Dorji said, "After the training, we will come up with a procedural guidebook on LGBT. We will then distribute it among the officers. It will help us to deal with the LGBT community in a free and fair manner".

The International Day Against Homophobia, Transphobia and Biphobia was first celebrated in Bhutan in 2016. United Nations offices in the country launched a video campaign to defend the rights of LGBTQ people. The LGBTQ pride flag was flown in the country for the first time, at the UN House in Thimphu. In 2018, the event was celebrated at Hotel Migmar with government representatives as well as from civil society and the media. The event has been observed each year ever since.

There is no annual gay pride parade or other public display in Bhutan. LGBTQ activist Tashi Tsheten has said that they do not plan on holding one, not because of a hostile environment or oppressive government, but because "pride parades are a form of activism where people go out on the streets and talk about policy and legal changes; and that's not something that Bhutanese agree with. We believe in building human relations and talking one-to-one. Connecting heart-to-heart. That's where the real change happens".

Deyon Phuntsho and Tenzin Gyeltshen, a same-sex couple who went public with their relationship in 2018, reported being fully accepted by their families and friends.

Tashi Tsheten, director of Rainbow Bhutan, said although there was a general acceptance of transgender people, especially in rural areas, they still face much discrimination, especially in schools, saying that "there are lots of barriers and our education system does not understand LGBT," adding that most LGBTQ youths drop out of school.

In 2022, Bhutan's Finance Minister Namgay Tshering claimed that "there is a high degree of acceptability of the LGBT+ community in our society". In the same year, Tashi Choden Chombal, an openly lesbian woman was crowned Miss Bhutan 2022 and represented Bhutan in the Miss Universe 2022 pageant.

=== Terminology ===
In 2015, the Dzongkha Development Commission, which seeks to promote and protect the Dzongkha language and introduce new words, announced Dzongkha terms for lesbian (མོ་སྦྱོར།, mo sbyor), gay (མཚུངས་སྦྱོར།, mtshungs sbyor), bisexual (ཟུང་སྦྱོར།, zung sbyor), transgender (མཚན་སྒྱུར།, mtshan sbyor), transvestite (སྤྱོད་སྒྱུར།, spyod sbyor), intersex (མ་ནིང།`, ma ning), homosexuality (འདྲ་སྦྱོར།, 'dra sbyor), and homophobia (མཚུངས་སྦྱོར་ཞན་ལོག, mtshungs sbyor zhan log).

The word "chakka" is an Indian slang term used as a slur for gay and effeminate men. The word "phomenmomen", meaning not male and not female, is used to label a gay person, but a more correct translation might be "intersex". Gay Bhutanese do not like nor use this word. Gay men themselves use English terms to describe themselves: "gay king" is an older top, "gay queen" is an older bottom, "freaking prince" is a young top, "freaking princess" is a young bottom, and "closet celebrity" refers to a closeted man that everyone knows is gay.

=== Political support ===
LGBTQ activist Tashi Tsheten said that, previously, in 2009 and 2010, Bhutanese officials would state at international conferences that the country had no homosexuals at all.

Dasho Neten Zangmo, the head of Bhutan's Anti-Corruption Commission described as "the most important woman in the country" and the "Iron Lady of Bhutan", was the first senior Bhutanese government official to make a comment about gay Bhutanese, when she said in a speech in August 2014 to high school students: "Romantic relationships, by the way, can be boy-boy or girl-girl."

In 2016, two Bhutanese National Assembly members, Madan Kumar Chhetri and Ugyen Wangdi, attended the Salzburg Global LGBT Forum, hosted by the Salzburg Global Seminar and held in Chiang Rai, Thailand, alongside two Bhutanese LGBTQ rights activists.

The Bhutan Kuen-Nyam Party (BKP) has expressed support for LGBTQ rights. In 2018, the party included the rights of LGBTQ people in their manifesto for the 2018 Bhutanese National Assembly election.

In June 2019, during the parliamentary debate on the decriminalisation of homosexuality, some MPs called for enacting legislation granting LGBTQ people some rights. MP Tshewang Lhamo (DNT), the chairperson of the Legislative Committee said, "A lot of people are affected in our society because of Sections 213 and 214. We must understand that laws need to be changed as per the changing times. Everyone should have the freedom of choice. We only consider male preferring female and vis-à-vis as natural, and anything beyond that as unnatural. People must know that everyone is equal before the law irrespective of who they are. This particular Section 213 discriminates against a section of people and this is the reason why our committee has come up with a proposal to remove this section." MP Kinley Wangchuk (DNT) said, "Even if there is no harm, we must not look at the law based not only on the country-level, but globally. It's also not fine if it is kept as it is. On a global level, outsiders might think there is no law at all meant for LGBT community and that they are considered as an invisible section of society, which might create a suspicion. Rather than removing the section, it's also important that we make a clear legal rights for them first". MP Jurmi Wangchuk (DNT) echoed Kinley Wangchuk's statement.

=== Public opinion ===
One of the first LGBTQ-related opinion polls in Bhutan carried out by an exchange student at the Royal Thimphu College on campus with 150 participants resulted in the following responses in 2013. 60% of the respondents believed that homosexuality is immoral and 40% believed that homosexuality should be accepted and homosexuals protected from discrimination and harm.

=== Demographics ===
According to 2018 estimates from the United Nations Development Programme, there were about 9,100 men who have sex with men in the capital Thimphu.

In 2019, the government-supported newspaper Kuensel stated that there were 316 people registered as LGBTQ in the country. Of these, 3 were lesbian, 21 transgender women, 31 transgender men, 3 bisexual women, 16 bisexual men, and 62 gay. 10 were below the age of 19 years, 93 were between 20 and 30 years, and 33 above 30 years. This number was 97 in 2017 and 118 in 2018.

=== HIV/AIDS ===
Lhak-Sam (BNP+) is the country's first association of HIV positive people. The association was formed in September 2009 and was registered as a civil society organization in November 2010 by executive director Wangda Dorji. Lhak-Sam has gained support from Joint United Nations Programme on HIV/AIDS and other international organizations as well as Bhutan's Ministry of Health.

Although gay and bisexual men are 19 times more vulnerable and transgender women are approximately 34-47 times more vulnerable to HIV infections, as of 2018 Bhutan has only one recorded case of HIV infection in the LGBTQ community.

=== Human rights reports ===
==== 2017 United States Department of State report ====
In 2017, the United States Department of State reported the following, concerning the status of LGBTQ rights in Bhutan:

- Acts of Violence, Discrimination, and Other Abuses Based on Sexual Orientation and Gender Identity
  "The constitution guarantees equal protection of the laws and application of rights but does not explicitly protect individuals from discrimination for sexual orientation or gender identity. Laws against "sodomy or any other sexual conduct that is against the order of nature" exist. The penal code imposes penalties of up to one year in prison for engaging in prohibited sexual conduct.
  Members of the LGBTI community reported instances of discrimination and social stigma based on sexual orientation.
  The law does not provide any distinct legal status to transgender individuals, nor does it provide explicit protections."

== Summary table ==
Right	Legal status
Same-sex sexual activity legal	Yes (Until 2004, Since 2021)
Equal age of consent (18)	Yes (Until 2004, Since 2021)
Anti-discrimination laws in employment only	Yes (Since 2019)
Anti-discrimination laws in the provision of goods and services	Yes (Since 2020)
Anti-discrimination laws in all other areas (incl. indirect discrimination, hate speech)	Yes / No
Same-sex marriage	No (Proposed)
Recognition of same-sex couples	No (Proposed)
Stepchild adoption by same-sex couples	No
Joint adoption by same-sex couples	No
LGBTQ people allowed to serve openly in the military	No
Right to change legal gender	Yes
Gender self-identification	No
Legal recognition of non-binary gender	No
Access to IVF for lesbians	No
Commercial surrogacy for gay male couples	No
MSMs, transgender people or lesbians allowed to donate blood	Yes

== See also ==
- Human rights in Bhutan
- LGBTQ rights in Asia
