= Karma Lhamo =

Bhutanese politician

Member of the National Assembly
- Incumbent
- Assumed office 2021
- Preceded by: Sherub Gyeltshen
- Constituency: Monggar
- In office 2008–2013
- Succeeded by: Jigme Zangpo
- Constituency: Monggar

Personal details
- Born: 6 May 1978 (age 48) Tshakaling, Bhutan
- Party: DNT (since 2021); DPT (until 2021)

Karma Lhamo (born 6 May 1978) is a Bhutanese educator and politician. She was elected to the National Assembly in 2008, becoming one of its first female members elected under universal suffrage.

== Biography ==
Lhamo was born in Tshakaling in May 1978, the daughter of a Lam Neten. She was educated at Monggar School, and earned a BA in psychology at Mount Carmel College in Bangalore and a post-graduate certificate in education from the National Institute of Education. In 2006 she began working as a teacher at Chukha Higher Secondary School. She married and had two children.

In 2008 she resigned from her teaching job after being nominated as a Druk Phuensum Tshogpa candidate for the Monggar constituency in the March 2008 National Assembly elections. She was elected to the National Assembly with 76% of the vote, defeating former Minister of Health Jigmi Singay.

She ran for re-election in 2013, but was defeated by Jigme Zangpo, losing by 272 votes. She ran again in 2018 but lost to Sherab Gyeltshen. However, following the resignation of Gyeltshen, Lhamo contested the by-election on 29 June 2021 as a candidate for the Druk Nyamrup Tshogpa and was elected.
