= Gyambo Tshering =

Bhutanese politician

Member of the National Assembly of Bhutan
- Incumbent
- Assumed office 31 October 2018
- Preceded by: Lekey Dorji
- Constituency: Bardo-Trong

Personal details
- Born: c. 1966
- Party: Druk Phuensum Tshogpa (DPT)

Gyambo Tshering is a Bhutanese politician who has been a member of the National Assembly of Bhutan, since October 2018.

== Education ==
He holds a Master's degree in Horticulture.

== Political career ==
He ran for the seat of the National Assembly of Bhutan as a candidate of DPT from Bardo-Trong constituency in the 2013 Bhutanese National Assembly election, but was unsuccessful. He received 2, 255 votes and lost the seat to Lekey Dorji, a candidate of the People's Democratic Party (PDP).

He was elected to the National Assembly of Bhutan as a candidate of DPT from Bardo-Trong constituency in 2018 Bhutanese National Assembly election. He received 3,633 votes and defeated Sonam Leki, a candidate of DNT.
