= Norbu Wangzom =

Bhutanese politician

Member of the National Assembly of Bhutan
- Incumbent
- Assumed office 31 October 2018
- Preceded by: Pelzang Wangchuk
- Constituency: Jomotshangkha Martshala
- In office 2008–2013
- Succeeded by: Pelzang Wangchuk
- Constituency: Jomotshangkha Martshala

Personal details
- Born: c. 1980
- Party: Druk Phuensum Tshogpa (DPT)

Norbu Wangzom is a Bhutanese politician who was a member of the National Assembly of Bhutan from October 2018 to 2023. Previously she was the member of the National Assembly of Bhutan from 2008 to 2013.

== Education ==
She holds a Bachelor of Science degree from Sherubtse College.

== Political career ==
She was elected to the National Assembly of Bhutan as a candidate of DPT from Jomotshangkha Martshala constituency in 2008 Bhutanese National Assembly election. She received 4,008 votes and defeated Pelzang Wangchuk, a candidate of PDP.

She ran for the seat of the National Assembly of Bhutan as a candidate of DPT in the 2013 Bhutanese National Assembly election, but was unsuccessful. She received 2,458 votes and lost the seat to the same opponent, Pelzang Wangchuk.

She was elected to the National Assembly of Bhutan as a candidate of DPT from Jomotshangkha Martshala constituency in 2018 Bhutanese National Assembly election. She received 4,372 votes and defeated Ugyen Dorji, a candidate of DNT.
