= Tenzin (politician) =

Bhutanese Politician

Member of the National Assembly of Bhutan
- Incumbent
- Assumed office 31 October 2018
- Preceded by: Damcho Dorji
- Constituency: Khatoed Laya

Personal details
- Born: c. 1982
- Party: Druk Nyamrup Tshogpa (DNT)

Tenzin is a Bhutanese politician who has been a member of the National Assembly of Bhutan, since October 2018.

== Education ==
He holds a Bachelor of Arts degree in Geography and Buddhist Literature from Sherubtse College.

== Political career ==
Prior to his political career, Tenzin was a community social worker.

He was elected to the National Assembly of Bhutan as a candidate of DNT from Khatoed Laya constituency in 2018 Bhutanese National Assembly election. He received 588 votes and defeated Changa Dawa, a candidate of Druk Phuensum Tshogpa. He also participated in the 2008 and 2013 elections.
