= Rinzin Jamtsho =

Bhutanese politician

Member of the National Assembly of Bhutan
- Incumbent
- Assumed office 31 October 2018
- Constituency: Kengkhar Weringla
- In office 2013–2018
- Constituency: Kengkhar Weringla

Personal details
- Born: c. 1979
- Party: Druk Phuensum Tshogpa (DPT)

Rinzin Jamtsho is a Bhutanese politician who has been a member of the National Assembly of Bhutan, since October 2018. Previously, he was a member of the National Assembly of Bhutan from 2013 to 2018.

== Education ==
He holds a BA (Honours) degree in English.

== Political career ==
Jamtsho was elected to the National Assembly of Bhutan as a candidate of DPT from Kengkhar Weringla constituency in 2013 Bhutanese National Assembly election.

He was re-elected to the National Assembly of Bhutan as a candidate of DPT from Kengkhar Weringla constituency in 2018 Bhutanese National Assembly election. He received 4,385 votes and defeated Kunzang Drukpa, a candidate of Druk Nyamrup Tshogpa.
