= Dupthob =

Bhutanese politician

Member of the National Assembly of Bhutan
- Incumbent
- Assumed office 31 October 2018
- Constituency: Boomdeling Jamkhar
- In office 2013–2018
- Constituency: Boomdeling Jamkhar

Personal details
- Born: 4 June 1978
- Party: Druk Phuensum Tshogpa (DPT)

Dupthob is a Bhutanese politician who has been a member of the National Assembly of Bhutan, since October 2018. Previously, he was a member of the National Assembly of Bhutan from 2013 to 2018.

== Education and personal life ==
He holds a Bachelor of Commerce from Sherubtse College. He is married and has a son.

== Political career ==
He was elected to the National Assembly of Bhutan as a candidate of DPT from Boomdeling-Jamkhar constituency in 2013 Bhutanese National Assembly election.

He was re-elected to the National Assembly of Bhutan as a candidate of DPT from Boomdeling-Jamkhar constituency in 2018 Bhutanese National Assembly election. He received 3541 votes and defeated Sangay Dorji, a candidate of DNT.
