= Wangchuk Namgyel =

Bhutanese politician

Former Tshogpoen Wangchuk Namgyel
- དབང་ཕྱུག་རྣམ་རྒྱལ།

Speaker of the National Assembly of Bhutan
- In office 7 November 2018 – 25 January 2024
- Prime Minister: Lotay Tshering
- Deputy: Tshencho Wangdi
- Preceded by: Jigme Zangpo
- Succeeded by: Lungten Dorji

Member of the National Assembly of Bhutan
- In office 31 October 2018 – November 2023
- Preceded by: Kuenga
- Succeeded by: Kuenga
- Constituency: Nyishog-Saephu

Personal details
- Born: c. 1964
- Party: Druk Nyamrup Tshogpa

Wangchuk Namgyel (Dzongkha: དབང་ཕྱུག་རྣམ་རྒྱལ།; born c. 1964) is a Bhutanese educationist and politician who was the speaker of the National Assembly of Bhutan from November 2018 to January 2024. He has been a member of the National Assembly of Bhutan from October 2018 till January 2024.

== Early life and education ==
Namgyel was born on c. 1964 or c. 1963.

He graduated from the University of Madras, India and received a degree of Master of Arts in history. He also has a Post Graduate Diploma in Education from National Institute of Education, Samtse.

== Career ==
=== Professional career ===
Namgyel started his professional career 27 years ago. He was a former headmaster of four high schools and also served as the chief of school monitoring in the education ministry.

Wangchuk Namgyel is currently serving as the Director of Student Affairs and Faculty Services at Jigme Singye Wangchuck School of Law.

=== Political career ===
Namgyel is a member of Druk Nyamrup Tshogpa (DNT). He was elected to the National Assembly of Bhutan as a candidate of DNT from Nyishog-Saephu constituency in the 2018 Bhutanese National Assembly election. He received 4,388 votes and defeated Chimmi Jamtsho, a candidate of DPT.

On 30 October 2018, he was nominated by DNT for the office of the Speaker of the National Assembly of Bhutan. On 31 October 2018, he was elected as the Speaker of the National Assembly of Bhutan. He received 30 votes against 17 votes of Ugyen Wangdi.

=== Honours ===
Wangchuk received Kabney (white scarf) and Patang from King Jigme Khesar Namgyel Wangchuck during the 117th National Day of Bhutan bestowing upon him the title of dasho for lifelong contribution to his country.
