= Ugyen =

Ugyen is a given name. Notable people with the name include:

- Ugyen Tshering Gyatso Bhutia, Bharatiya Janata Party politician from Sikkim
- Ugyen Trinley Dorje (born 1985), claimant to the title of 17th Karmapa
- Ugyen Dorji (1855–1916), member of the elite Dorji family, Bhutanese politician, Chief Minister of Bhutan
- Ugyen Dorji (DNT politician) (c. 1986) is a Bhutanese politician, Minister for Labour and Human Resources
- Ugyen Dorji (DPT politician), Bhutanese politician, member of the National Assembly of Bhutan
- Ugyen Dorji (footballer), Bhutanese international footballer
- Ugyen Namgay, Bhutanese politician, member of the National Council of Bhutan,
- Ugyen Tshering (born 1954), Bhutanese politician, minister for foreign affairs
- Ugyen Tshering (DNT politician), Bhutanese politician, member of the National Assembly of Bhutan
- Ugyen Tshering (National Council member), Bhutanese politician, member of the National Council of Bhutan
- Ugyen Ugyen (born 1974), archer who represented Bhutan internationally
- Jigme Ugyen Wangchuck (born 2020), the second child of King Jigme Khesar Namgyel Wangchuck of Bhutan
- Jigyel Ugyen Wangchuck (born 1984), Bhutanese prince
- Ugyen Jigme Wangchuck (born 1994), member of the royal family of Bhutan, son of the fourth King of Bhutan
- Ugyen Wangchuck (1862–1926), the first Druk Gyalpo (King) of Bhutan from 1907 to 1926
- Ugyen Wangdi, Bhutanese politician, Druk Phuensum Tshogpa member of the National Assembly of Bhutan

== See also ==
- Ugyen Academy, private school in Punakha, Bhutan
- Ugyen Academy FC, Bhutanese professional football club based in Punakha
- Ugen
