= Tshering Choden (politician) =

Bhutanese politician

Member of the National Assembly of Bhutan
- Incumbent
- Assumed office 31 October 2018
- Preceded by: Zangley Dukpa
- Constituency: Khar Yurung

Personal details
- Born: c. 1973
- Party: Druk Phuensum Tshogpa (DPT)

Tshering Choden is a Bhutanese politician who has been a member of the National Assembly of Bhutan, since October 2018.

== Education and professional life ==
She holds a Master's degree in educational leadership and management. She has worked as a teacher and a principal.

== Political career ==
Choden ran for the seat of the National Assembly of Bhutan as a candidate of PDP in the 2013 Bhutanese National Assembly election, but was unsuccessful.

She was elected to the National Assembly of Bhutan as a candidate of DPT from Khar-Yurung constituency in 2018 Bhutanese National Assembly election. She received 4,738 votes and defeated Ugyen Tshewang, a candidate of Druk Nyamrup Tshogpa.
