= Ugyen Wangdi =

Bhutanese politician

Member of the National Assembly of Bhutan
- In office 31 October 2018 – 2023
- Constituency: Dramedtse Ngatshang
- In office 2013–2018
- Constituency: Dramedtse Ngatshang

Personal details
- Born: c. 1969
- Party: Druk Phuensum Tshogpa (DPT)

Ugyen Wangdi is a Bhutanese politician who was a Druk Phuensum Tshogpa (DPT) member of the National Assembly of Bhutan from October 2018 to 2023. Previously he was member of the National Assembly from 2013 to 2018.

== Political career ==
He was elected to the National Assembly as a candidate of DPT from Dramedtse Ngatshang constituency in 2013 Bhutanese National Assembly election. He received 4,164 votes and defeated Tshering Dorji, a candidate of PDP.

He was re-elected to the National Assembly as a candidate of DPT from Dramedtse Ngatshang constituency in the 2018 Bhutanese National Assembly election. He received 5,602 votes and defeated Jigme Dorji, a candidate of DNT.

Following his successful election, DPT nominated him for the office of Speaker of the National Assembly of Bhutan. He received 17 votes and lost the election to Wangchuk Namgyel of Druk Nyamrup Tshogpa who received 30 votes.
