= Choki Gyeltshen =

Bhutanese politician

Member of the National Assembly of Bhutan
- Incumbent
- Assumed office 31 October 2018
- Preceded by: Yeshey Dorji
- Constituency: Maenbi Tsaenkhar

Personal details
- Born: c. 1966 Metsho Gewog
- Party: Druk Phuensum Tshogpa (DPT)

Choki Gyeltshen is a Bhutanese politician who has been a member of the National Assembly of Bhutan, since October 2018.

== Education ==
He holds a Master's degree in Education from Acharya Nagarjuna University, India.

== Political career ==
Before joining politics, he has worked with Ministry of Education for 27 years.

Gyeltshen was elected to the National Assembly of Bhutan as a candidate of DPT from Maenbi Tsaenkhar constituency in 2018 Bhutanese National Assembly election. He received 2,941 votes and defeated Tshering Phuntsho, a candidate of Druk Nyamrup Tshogpa.
