= Karma Wangchuk =

Bhutanese politician

Drungtsho Karma Wangchuk

Member of the National Assembly of Bhutan
- In office 31 October 2018 – 2023
- Preceded by: Tshewang Jurmi
- Constituency: Chhumig Ura

Personal details
- Born: c. 1970
- Party: Druk Phuensum Tshogpa (DPT)

Drungtsho Karma Wangchuk is a Bhutanese politician who was a member of the National Assembly of Bhutan from October 2018 to 2023.

== Education and professional life ==
He holds a Bachelor's degree in indigenous medicine. He worked as a drungtsho (traditional physician) since 1998.

== Political career ==
Wangchuk was elected to the National Assembly of Bhutan as a candidate of DPT from Chhumig Ura constituency in 2018 Bhutanese National Assembly election. He received 1438 votes (through postal ballot and electronic voting machines) and defeated Phuntsho Namgay, a candidate of Druk Nyamrup Tshogpa.

Following Wangchuk's successful election, DPT nominated him for the Deputy Speaker of the National Assembly of Bhutan on 30 October 2018. On 31 October 2018, he lost the office to Tshencho Wangdi.
