= Lungten Namgyal =

Bhutanese politician

Member of the National Assembly of Bhutan
- Incumbent
- Assumed office 31 October 2018
- Preceded by: Jigme Y. Thinley
- Constituency: Nanong-Shumar

Personal details
- Born: c. 1985
- Party: Druk Phuensum Tshogpa (DPT)

Lungten Namgyal is a Bhutanese politician who has been a member of the National Assembly of Bhutan, since October 2018.

== Education ==
He holds a Bachelor of Science degree in Life Science from Sherubtse College.

== Political career ==
He was elected to the National Assembly of Bhutan as a candidate of DPT from Nanong-Shumar constituency in 2018 Bhutanese National Assembly election. He received 4311 votes and defeated Pema Wangda, a candidate of DNT.
