= Ugyen Dorji (DPT politician) =

Bhutanese politician

Member of the National Assembly of Bhutan
- In office 31 October 2018 – 2023
- Preceded by: Mingbo Dukpa
- Constituency: Dewathang Gomdar
- In office 2008–2013
- Succeeded by: Mingbo Dukpa
- Constituency: Dewathang Gomdar

Personal details
- Born: c. 1975
- Party: Druk Phuensum Tshogpa (DPT)

Ugyen Dorji is a Bhutanese politician who was a member of the National Assembly of Bhutan from October 2018 to 2023.

== Education ==
He holds a Master's degree in Industrial and Employment Relations from Monash University, Australia.

== Political career ==
Dorji was elected to the National Assembly of Bhutan as a candidate of DPT in the 2008 Bhutanese National Assembly election. He received 5,610 votes and defeated Mingbo Dukpa, a candidate of PDP.

He ran for the seat of the National Assembly of Bhutan as a candidate of DPT in the 2013 Bhutanese National Assembly election, but was unsuccessful. He received 2,205 votes and lost the seat to the same opponent Mingbo Dukpa.

Dorji was elected to the National Assembly of Bhutan as a candidate of DPT from Dewathang Gomdar constituency in 2018 Bhutanese National Assembly election. He received 5,367 votes and defeated Thinley Namgay, a candidate of DNT.
