= Samdrup R. Wangchuk =

Bhutanese politician

Member of the National Assembly of Bhutan
- Incumbent
- Assumed office 31 October 2018
- Preceded by: Norbu Wangchuk
- Constituency: Kanglung Samkhar Udzorong

Personal details
- Born: c. 1965
- Party: Druk Phuensum Tshogpa (DPT)

Samdrup R. Wangchuk is a Bhutanese politician who has been a member of the National Assembly of Bhutan, since October 2018.

== Education ==
He holds a Bachelor of Dental Surgery (BDS) degree and a Master in Orthodontics from Khonkaen University, Thailand.

== Political career ==
Before joining politics, he worked as a first and only Orthodontist at JDWNRH.

He was elected to the National Assembly of Bhutan as a candidate of DPT from Kanglung Samkhar Udzorong constituency in 2018 Bhutanese National Assembly election. He received 3866 votes and defeated Tenzin Namgay, a candidate of DNT.
