= Dinesh Kumar Pradhan =

Bhutanese politician

Member of the National Assembly of Bhutan
- Incumbent
- Assumed office 31 October 2018
- Preceded by: Madan Kumar Chhetri
- Constituency: Ugyentse-Yoeseltse

Personal details
- Born: c. 1960
- Party: Druk Nyamrup Tshogpa (DNT)

Dinesh Kumar Pradhan is a Bhutanese politician who has been a member of the National Assembly of Bhutan, since October 2018.

== Education ==
He holds a Bachelor of Education degree from St. Francis Xavier University, Canada and a Master of Education degree from National Institute of Education, Samtse.

== Political career ==
He was elected to the National Assembly of Bhutan as a candidate of DPT from Ugyentse-Yoeseltse constituency in 2018 Bhutanese National Assembly election. He received 5,353 votes and defeated Lila Pradhan, a candidate of DPT.
