= Sherub Gyeltshen =

Bhutanese politician

Lyonpo Sherub Gyeltshen
- ཤེས་རབ་རྒྱལ་མཚན།
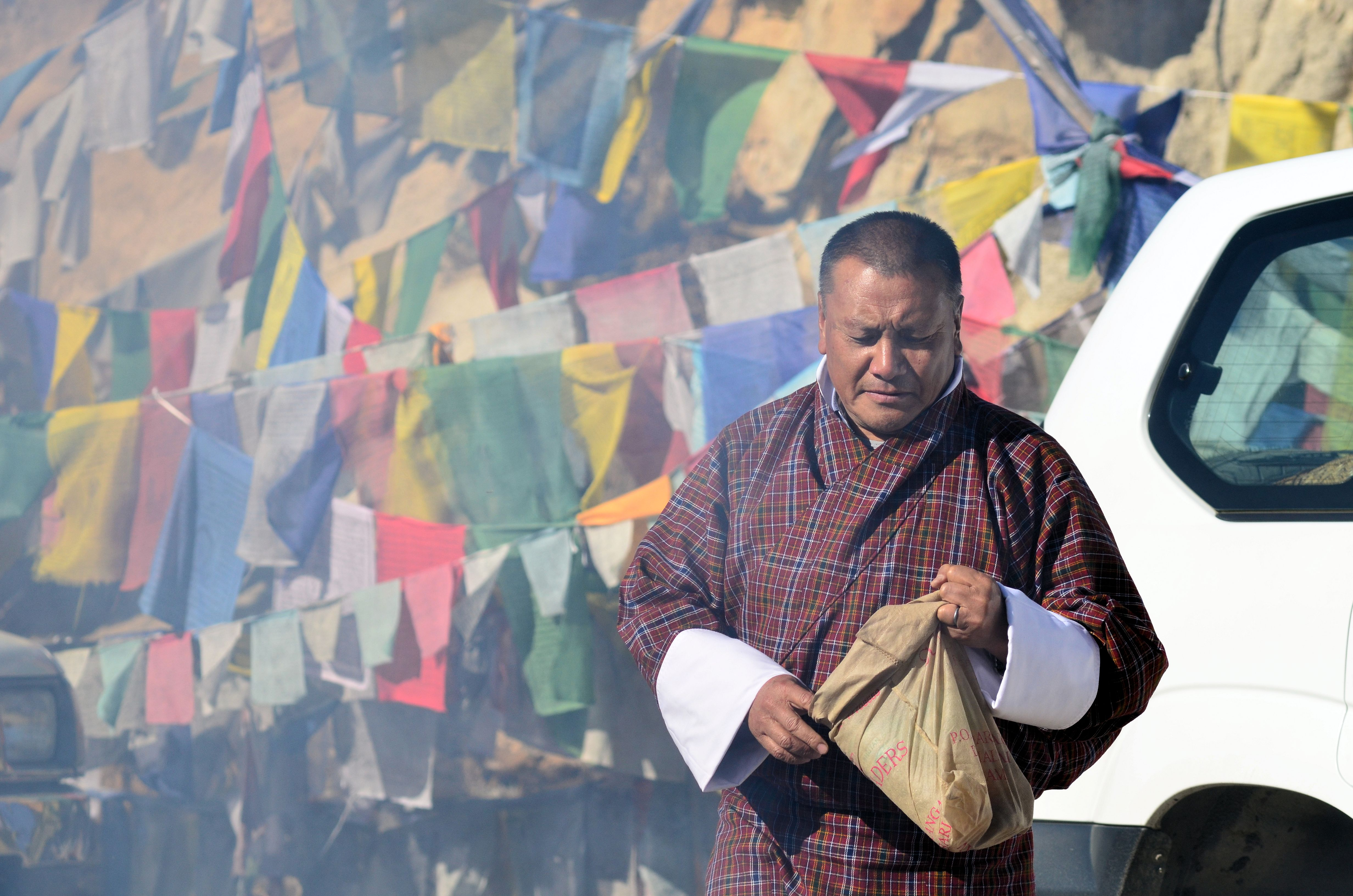
- Gyeltshen at Trumshingla pass in 2011

Minister for Home and Cultural Affairs
- In office 7 November 2018 – 6 May 2021
- Prime Minister: Lotay Tshering
- Preceded by: Dawa Gyeltshen

Member of the National Assembly of Bhutan
- In office 31 October 2018 – 6 May 2021
- Preceded by: Jigme Zangpo
- Succeeded by: Karma Lhamo
- Constituency: Monggar

Vice President of Druk Nyamrup Tshogpa
- In office 14 May 2018 – May 2021

Personal details
- Born: c. 1955
- Party: Druk Nyamrup Tshogpa
- Education: University of Punjab, India (BA in Political Science and Public Administration)

Dasho Sherub Gyeltshen (Dzongkha: དྲག་ཤོས་ཤེས་རབ་རྒྱལ་མཚན།; born c. 1955) is a Bhutanese politician who served as the Minister for Home and Cultural Affairs from November 2018 to 6 May 2021 when he resigned. He was a member of the National Assembly of Bhutan from October 2018 to 6 May 2021.

== Career ==
Gyeltshen worked with the Ministry of Home and Cultural Affairs for 11 years. On 24 April 1991, he was appointed as Dzongdag for Lhuntse District and also served as the Dzongdag for Samtse District and Thimphu District. He has also served as justice of High Court of Bhutan and also served as a Secretary of Dzongkha Development Commission.

On 14 May 2018, Gyeltshen received 1,086 votes and was elected as the vice president of the Druk Nyamrup Tshogpa (DNT) just five months before the Third National Assembly Election.

He was elected to the National Assembly of Bhutan in the 2018 elections for the Monggar constituency. He received 3,763 votes and defeated Karma Lhamo, a candidate of DPT.

On 3 November, Lotay Tshering formally announced his cabinet structure and Gyeltshen was named as the Minister for Home and Cultural Affairs. On 7 November 2018, he was sworn in as Minister for Home and Cultural Affairs in the cabinet of Prime Minister Lotay Tshering. On 27 August 2019, he was convicted by the Thimphu dzongkhag court for a false insurance claim.

Political offices
Preceded by Dawa Gyeltshen	Minister for Home and Cultural Affairs; 2018–present	Incumbent
