= Tshencho Wangdi =

Bhutanese politician

Deputy Speaker of the National Assembly of Bhutan
- In office 7 November 2018 – 2023
- Prime Minister: Lotay Tshering
- Preceded by: Chimi Dorji

Member of the National Assembly of Bhutan
- Preceded by: Dophu Dukpa
- Constituency: Kabisa-Talog

Personal details
- Born: c. 1984 Talo Gewog, Punakha District
- Party: Druk Nyamrup Tshogpa
- Education: Royal Thimphu College; Webster University Thailand

Tshencho Wangdi (born c. 1984) is a Bhutanese politician who was the Deputy Speaker of the National Assembly of Bhutan from November 2018 to 2023. He was a member of the National Assembly of Bhutan from October 2018 to 2023.

== Early life and education ==
Wangdi was born on c. 1984. in Talo Gewog, Punakha District.

He graduated from the Webster University Thailand and received a degree of Master of Arts in International Relations. Before joining university, he received a degree of BA in Political Science and Sociology from Royal Thimphu College.

== Professional career ==
Before joining politics, he worked as a general manager and managing director at tour companies.

== Political career ==
Tshencho Wangdi is a member Druk Nyamrup Tshogpa (DNT).

He ran for the seat of the National Council of Bhutan from Punakha constituency in the 2018 Bhutanese National Council election, but was unsuccessful. He came in second receiving 1,511 votes and losing the seat to Lhaki Dolma.

He was elected to the National Assembly of Bhutan as a candidate of DNT from Kabisa Talog constituency in the 2018 Bhutanese National Assembly election. He received 4,294 votes and defeated Kinley Wangchuk, a candidate of Druk Phuensum Tshogpa.

On 30 October 2018, he was nominated by DNT for the office of the Deputy Speaker of the National Assembly of Bhutan. On 31 October 2018, he was elected as the Deputy Speaker of the National Assembly of Bhutan. He received 31 votes against 16 votes of Karma Wangchuk.
