= Bimal Thapa =

Bhutanese politician

Member of the National Assembly of Bhutan
- Incumbent
- Assumed office 31 October 2018
- Preceded by: Yogesh Tamang
- Constituency: Kilkhorthang-Mendrelgang

Personal details
- Born: c. 1986
- Party: Druk Nyamrup Tshogpa (DNT)

Bimal Thapa is a Bhutanese politician who has been a member of the National Assembly of Bhutan, since October 2018.

== Education ==
He holds a Bachelor of Science in Information Technology degree from RVS College of Arts and Science, India.

== Political career ==
Before joining politics, he was a farmer.

He was elected to the National Assembly of Bhutan as a candidate of DNT from Kilkhorthang-Mendrelgang constituency in 2018 Bhutanese National Assembly election. He received 6,681 votes and defeated Yangku Tshering Sherpa, a candidate of DPT.
