= Ugen Tenzin =

Bhutanese politician

Member of the National Assembly of Bhutan
- Incumbent
- Assumed office 31 October 2018
- Preceded by: Kinley Om
- Constituency: Bji Katsho Eusu
- In office 2008–2013
- Succeeded by: Kinley Om (PDP)
- Constituency: Bji Katsho Eusu

Personal details
- Born: c. 1966
- Party: Druk Nyamrup Tshogpa (DNT)

Ugen Tenzin is a Bhutanese politician who has been a member of the National Assembly of Bhutan, since October 2018. Previously, he was a member of the National Assembly of Bhutan from 2008 to 2013.

== Education ==
He holds a Master of Public Administration degree.

== Political career ==
Tenzin was elected to the National Assembly of Bhutan as a candidate of Druk Phuensum Tshogpa (DPT) from Bji Kar Tshog Uesu constituency in 2008 Bhutanese National Assembly election.

He later left DPT to join Druk Nyamrup Tshogpa and was elected for the second time to the National Assembly of Bhutan from Bji Kar Tshog Uesu constituency in the 2018 Bhutanese National Assembly election. He received 1,879 votes, defeating Sonam Tobgay, a candidate of DPT.
