= Jurmi Wangchuk =

Bhutanese politician

Member of the National Assembly of Bhutan
- Incumbent
- Assumed office 31 October 2018
- Preceded by: Karma Dorji
- Constituency: Drukjeygang-Tseza

Personal details
- Born: c. 1961
- Party: Druk Nyamrup Tshogpa (DNT)

Jurmi Wangchuk is a Bhutanese politician who has been a member of the National Assembly of Bhutan, since October 2018.

== Education and professional career ==
He holds a Master's degree in international relations (specialization in human rights) from Goddard College, USA. He worked in the office of the United Nations High Commissioner for Human Rights, Geneva and Department of Peacekeeping Operations, New York.

== Political career ==
Wangchuk was elected to the National Assembly of Bhutan as a candidate of DNT from Drukjeygang Tseza constituency in the 2018 Bhutanese National Assembly election. He received 6,087 votes and defeated Migma Dorji, a candidate of Druk Phuensum Tshogpa.

On 7 December 2018, he was elected as the chairperson of the Human Rights and Foreign Relations Committee.
