= Karma Thinley =

Bhutanese politician

Member of the National Assembly of Bhutan
- Incumbent
- Assumed office 31 October 2018
- Preceded by: Karma Tenzin
- Constituency: Wamrong

Personal details
- Born: c. 1973
- Party: Druk Phuensum Tshogpa (DPT)

Karma Thinley is a Bhutanese politician who has been a member of the National Assembly of Bhutan, since October 2018.

== Education ==
He holds a Master's degree in Educational Leadership and Management from St. Francis Xavier University, Canada.

== Political career ==
Before joining politics, he was a teacher.

He was elected to the National Assembly of Bhutan as a candidate of DPT from Wamrong constituency in 2018 Bhutanese National Assembly election. He received 2980 votes and defeated Jigme Wangdi, a candidate of DNT.
