= Kuenga Loday =

Bhutanese politician

Member of the National Assembly of Bhutan
- In office 31 October 2018 – 18 November 2021
- Preceded by: Kesang Wangdi
- Succeeded by: Karma Gyeltshen
- Constituency: Khamdang-Ramjar

Personal details
- Born: c. 1977
- Party: Druk Phuensum Tshogpa (DPT)

Kuenga Loday is a Bhutanese politician who was a member of the National Assembly of Bhutan from October 2018 to November 2021.

== Education ==
He holds a Master of Public Administration degree.

== Political career ==
He was elected to the National Assembly of Bhutan as a candidate of DPT from Khamdang-Ramjar constituency in 2018 Bhutanese National Assembly election. He received 3602 votes and defeated Karma Gyeltshen, a candidate of DNT.

In August 2021 Loday was sentenced to five years in prison for illegal road construction. He resigned his seat in the National Assembly in November 2021. Karma Gyeltshen of the DNT won the by-election to replace him.
