= Tshewang Lhamo =

Bhutanese politician

Member of the National Assembly of Bhutan
- Incumbent
- Assumed office 31 October 2018
- Preceded by: Dawa Gyaltshen
- Constituency: Bongo-Chapchha

Member of the National Council of Bhutan
- In office 2008–2013
- Constituency: Chhukha

Personal details
- Born: c. 1982 Tshimasham, Bjacho Gewog
- Party: Druk Nyamrup Tshogpa (DNT)

Tshewang Lhamo is a Bhutanese politician who has been a member of the National Assembly of Bhutan, since October 2018. Previously, she was a member of the National Council of Bhutan from 2008 to 2013.

== Education ==
She holds a Bachelor's degree in commerce and a diploma in hospitality and management.

== Political career ==
Lhamo was elected to the National Council of Bhutan from Chhukha constituency in the 2008 Bhutanese National Council election.

She ran for the seat of the National Council of Bhutan from Chhukha constituency in the 2013 Bhutanese National Council election, but was unsuccessful.

She was elected to the National Assembly of Bhutan as a candidate of DNT from Constituency Bongo-Chapchha in 2018 Bhutanese National Assembly election. She received 6,632 votes and defeated Pempa, a candidate of Druk Phuensum Tshogpa.
