= Ugyen Tshering (DNT politician) =

Bhutanese politician

Member of the National Assembly of Bhutan
- Incumbent
- Assumed office 31 October 2018
- Preceded by: Khandu Wangchuk
- Constituency: Lamgong-Wangchang

Personal details
- Born: c. 1965
- Party: Druk Nyamrup Tshogpa (DNT)

Ugyen Tshering is a Bhutanese politician who has been a member of the National Assembly of Bhutan, since October 2018. Previously, he was a member of the National Council of Bhutan from 2008 to 2013.

== Education ==
He graduated from the University of Delhi and received a degree of Master of Arts. He also holds a Post Graduate degree in Film Editing and Television Studies.

== Political career ==
Before joining politics, he was a documentarian.

He was elected to the National Council of Bhutan from Paro in the Bhutanese National Council election, 2008.

He was elected to the National Assembly of Bhutan as a candidate of DNT from Lamgong-Wangchang constituency in 2018 Bhutanese National Assembly election. He received 3,566 votes and defeated Phub Tshering, a candidate of Druk Phuensum Tshogpa.
