= Ugyen Dorji (disambiguation) =

Ugyen Dorji (1855–1916) was a Chief Minister of Bhutan.

Ugyen Dorji may also refer to:

- Ugyen Dorji (DNT politician) (born c. 1986), Bhutanese politician and member of the Druk Nyamrup Tshogpa (DNT)
- Ugyen Dorji (DPT politician), Bhutanese politician and member of the Druk Phuensum Tshogpa (DPT)
- Ugyen Dorji (footballer), Bhutanese footballer
