= Lungten Dorji =

Bhutanese politician

Speaker of the National Assembly
- In office 25 January 2024 – 19 August 2026
- Preceded by: Wangchuk Namgyel
- Succeeded by: Tempa Dorji

Member of the National Assembly
- Incumbent
- Assumed office January 2024
- In office 2006–2007

Personal details
- Born: 11 November 1964 (age 61)
- Party: People's Democratic Party

Lungten Dorji (born 11 November 1964) is a Bhutanese politician was the Speaker of the National Assembly from January 2024 to August 2026. He is a member of the People's Democratic Party and previously served in the legislature from 2006 to 2007.

== Biography ==
Dorji was born on 11 November 1964. He is from Zhemgang District in Bhutan. He attended Sherubtse College in Bhutan, where he earned a Bachelor of Arts degree, and later received a master's degree in public administration from the International Institute of Public Administration in Paris, France.

Dorji entered civil service when he was approximately aged 27. He served various different political positions, including being the dzongdag of Trashigang and Trongsa for 10 years, then being the Director General of Department of Local Governance, Ministry of Home and Cultural Affairs. He also held the titles of Head of the Office of Census Commissioner and Deputy Director of the Department of Immigration and Census.

A member of the People's Democratic Party (PDP), Dorji was a member of the National Assembly from 2006 to 2007. He was a candidate in the 2018 Bhutanese National Assembly election from the Panbang constituency in Zhemgang, although he was not elected. He ran again during the 2023–24 Bhutanese National Assembly election and won the Panbang seat with 2,628 votes. On 25 January 2024, he was unanimously chosen by the ruling PDP party to be the Speaker of the National Assembly, being selected for a five-year term that will expire in 2028.
