= Tshering Wangchuk =

Bhutanese jurist and politician

Dasho Tshering Wangchuk ཚེ་རིང་དབང་ཕྱུག།
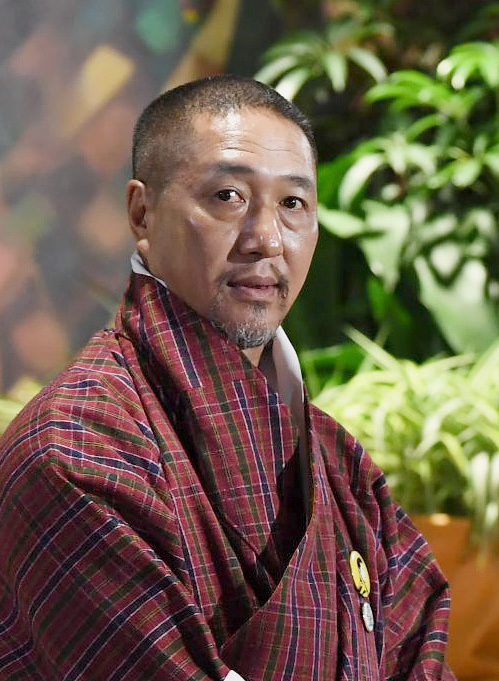
- Wangchuk in 2018

2nd Chief Advisor of Bhutan
- In office 9 August 2018 – 7 November 2018
- Monarch: Jigme Khesar Namgyel Wangchuck
- Preceded by: Tshering Tobgay (as Prime Minister)
- Succeeded by: Lotay Tshering (as Prime Minister)

Chief Justice of Bhutan
- In office 29 November 2014 – 29 November 2019
- Monarch: Jigme Khesar Namgyel Wangchuck
- Preceded by: Sonam Tobgye
- Succeeded by: Chogyal Dago Rigdzin

Personal details
- Education: George Washington University; University of Delhi

Military service
- Allegiance: Bhutan
- Branch/service: Royal Bhutan Army
- Years of service: 1990–1995
- Rank: Second Lieutenant

Dasho Tshering Wangchuk (Dzongkha: ཚེ་རིང་དབང་ཕྱུག) is a Bhutanese jurist who served as the Chief Justice of the Supreme Court of Bhutan from 2014 to 2019. In 2018, Wanghuk served as the interim Head of Government of Bhutan, when serving as the Chief Advisor of the Interim Government, following the dissolution of the Bhutanese National Assembly in preparation of elections.

== Career ==
Tshering Wangchuk graduated from George Washington University with a Master of Laws degree in international law and judicial process and from the University of Delhi with a Bachelor of Laws degree. He was a second lieutenant in the Royal Bhutan Army from 1990 to 1995.

Wangchuk began his career as a judicial officer in 1987, serving as an apprentice to the judges of the High Court. From 1990 to 1995 he served as a Second Lieutenant in the Royal Bhutan Army. He served as a judicial officer in the High Court from 1993 to 1999. From 2006 to 2010 he served in Samdrup Jongkhar as district court judge. In 2010 he was promoted to justice of the High Court. Chief Justice Sonam Tobgay retired in 2014, and Wangchuk was appointed to replace him by King Jigme Khesar Namgyel Wangchuck. Rinzin Gyaltshen was a more senior justice than Wangchuk, but was retiring soon due to age.

== Chief Advisor ==
On August 1, 2018, Bhutan's lower house dissolved in preparation for general elections. On August 9, the king appointed an interim government, headed by Wangchuk as Chief Advisor. On August 11, members of the Interim Government were assigned portfolios. Wangchuk was responsible for the ministries of Home, Cultural Affairs, and Foreign affairs.

Political offices
Preceded by Tshering Tobgay (as Prime Minister)	Head of Government of Bhutan as Chief Advisor; 2018	Succeeded by Lotay Tshering (as Prime Minister)
