= Thinley =

Thinley is a given name and a surname. Notable people with the name include:

- Thinley Dorji (footballer) (born 1995), Bhutanese international footballer
- Thinley Dorji (archer), Bhutanese Olympic archer
- Thinley Norbu (1931–2011), modern teacher in the Nyingma lineage of Tibetan Buddhism, and patron of the Vajrayana Foundation
- Alak Jigme Thinley Lhundup Rinpoche (1938–2012), Tibetan Tulku, former speaker of the Tibetan Parliament in Exile
- Karma Thinley Rinpoche (born 1931), master of the Kagyu Mahamudra, Sakya Lamdré and Chod traditions of Tibetan Buddhism
- Jigme Thinley (born 1952), former Prime Minister of Bhutan
- Karma Thinley, Bhutanese politician, member of the National Assembly of Bhutan

== See also ==
- Tinley
