= Kinley Wangchuk (politician) =

Bhutanese politician

Member of the National Assembly of Bhutan
- Incumbent
- Assumed office 31 October 2018
- Preceded by: Tandin Wangchuk
- Constituency: Athang-Thedtsho

Personal details
- Born: c. 1980
- Party: Druk Nyamrup Tshogpa (DNT)

Kinley Wangchuk is a Bhutanese politician who has been a member of the National Assembly of Bhutan since October 2018.

== Education ==
He holds an MA degree in Diplomacy and International Studies from Rangsit University, Thailand. He completed his B.Ed from Paro College of Education, Bhutan and PgC in Journalism from Goldsmiths, University of London.

== Political career ==
Before joining politics, he was a media consultant.

He was elected to the National Assembly of Bhutan as a candidate of DNT from Athang-Thedtsho constituency in 2018 Bhutanese National Assembly election. He received 4,001 votes and defeated Nim Gyeltshen, a candidate of DPT.
