= Zangley Dukpa =

Bhutanese politician

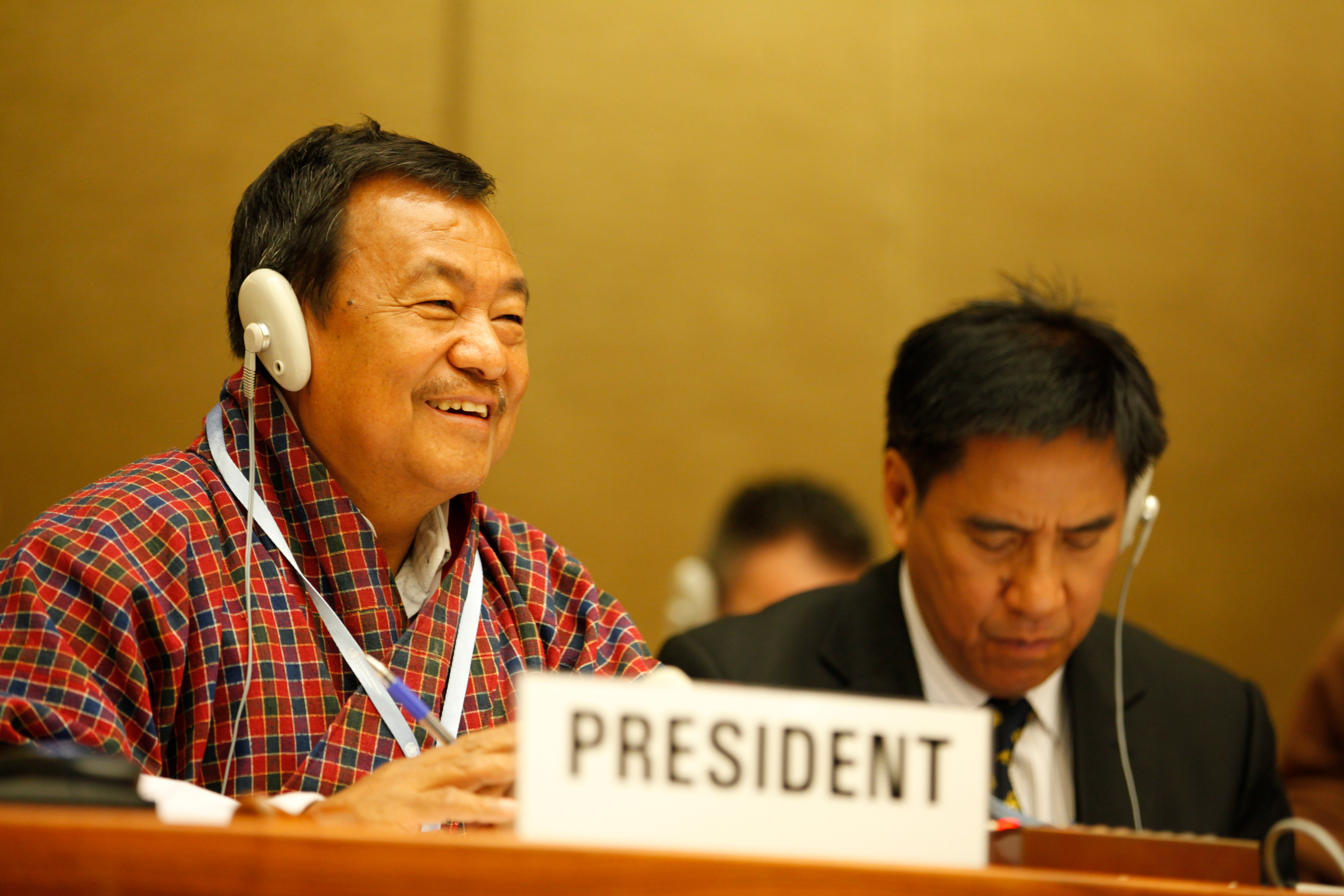
- Zangley Dukpa in 2012

Member of the National Assembly of Bhutan
- In office 13 July 2013 – 2018
- Succeeded by: Tshering Choden
- Constituency: Khar Yurung

Personal details
- Born: 2 February 1950 (age 76)
- Party: Bhutan Peace and Prosperity Party (DPT)
- Education: University of Bristol

Zangley Dukpa (born 2 February 1950) is a Bhutanese politician who has been a Bhutan Peace and Prosperity Party (DPT) member of the National Assembly of Bhutan from 2013 to 2018. He also served as Minister of Health of Bhutan.

He obtained a master's degree in education from the University of Bristol in 1983.
