= Chief Adviser =

Chief Adviser or Chief Advisor may refer to:

- Chief Advisor of Bhutan, the head of an interim government of Bhutan
- Chief Adviser of Bangladesh, the head of a caretaker government of Bangladesh
