= Loday =

Loday is a surname. Notable people with the surname include:

- Jean-Louis Loday (1946–2012), French mathematician
- Karma Loday Bhutia, Indian politician from Sikkim
- Kuenga Loday (born c. 1977), Bhutanese politician
- Yves Loday (born 1955), French sailor
