= Netan =

Netan can refer to:

- Cyber Terror Response Center in Korea
- Netan, a fictional character in Stargate SG-1
- Neten Zangmo (born 1961), Bhutanese government official and politician
