= Tshering Choden =

Tshering Choden or Tshering Chhoden may refer to:

- Tshering Choden (archer) (born 1979), Bhutanese archer
- Tshering Choden (politician) (born c. 1973), Bhutanese politician
