= Kinley Wangchuk =

Kinley Wangchuk may refer to:

- Kinley Wangchuk (politician) (born 1980), Bhutanese politician
- Kinley Wangchuk (footballer) (born 1984), Bhutanese footballer
