= Jigme Zangpo =

Bhutanese politician

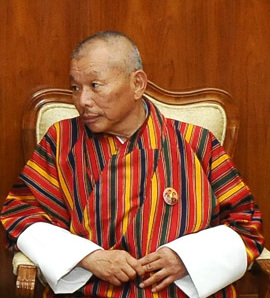
- Jigme Zangpo in 2015

Speaker of the National Assembly
- In office 2013–2018
- Prime Minister: Tshering Tobgay
- Preceded by: Jigme Tshultim
- Succeeded by: Wangchuk Namgyel

Personal details
- Party: Druk Phuensum Tshogpa

Lyonpo Jigme Zangpo is a Bhutanese politician who served as the Speaker of the National Assembly in Bhutan from 2013 to 2018.
