= Chogyal Dago Rigdzin =

Bhutanese jurist and politician

- ཆོས་རྒྱལ་ ཟླ་གོ་ རིག་འཛིན་

3rd Chief Advisor of Bhutan
- In office 1 November 2023 – 28 January 2024
- Monarch: Jigme Khesar Namgyel Wangchuck
- Preceded by: Lotay Tshering (as Prime Minister)
- Succeeded by: Tshering Tobgay (as Prime Minister)

Chief Justice of Bhutan
- In office 12 June 2020 – 11 June 2025
- Monarch: Jigme Khesar Namgyel Wangchuck

Chogyal Dago Rigdzin has served as the Chief Justice of the Supreme Court of Bhutan from 12 June 2020 to 11 June 2025. He was previously the Election Commission of Bhutan from July 2015 to June 2020. From 2023 to 2024, Rigdzin served as the interim Head of Government of Bhutan, when serving as the Chief Advisor of the Interim Government, following the dissolution of the Bhutanese National Assembly in preparation of elections.
