= Lotay Tshering =

Prime Minister of Bhutan from 2018 to 2023

- བློ་གྲོས་ཚེ་རིང་
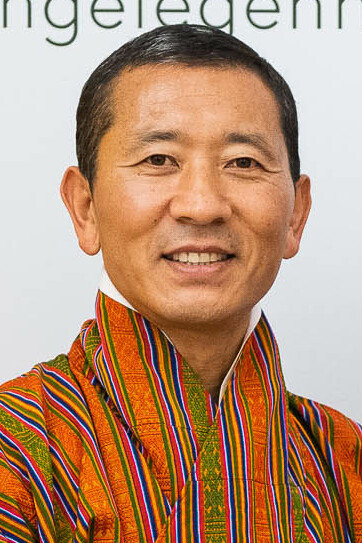
- Tshering in 2023

Prime Minister of Bhutan
- In office 7 November 2018 – 1 November 2023
- Monarch: Jigme Khesar Namgyel Wangchuck
- Preceded by: Tshering Wangchuk (as Chief Advisor)
- Succeeded by: Chogyal Dago Rigdzin (as Chief Advisor)

President of Druk Nyamrup Tshogpa
- In office 14 May 2018 – January 2025
- Deputy: Sherab Gyaltshen
- Preceded by: Tandi Dorji

Member of the National Assembly of Bhutan
- In office 31 October 2018 – November 2023
- Preceded by: Yeshi Zimba
- Constituency: South Thimphu
- Majority: 3,662

Personal details
- Born: 10 May 1969 (age 57)
- Party: Druk Nyamrup Tshogpa
- Spouse: Ugyen Dema
- Children: 3 (two adopted)
- Education: Mymensingh Medical College (MBBS); Bangladesh College of Physicians and Surgeons (FCPS); Bangladesh Medical University (MS); University of Canberra (MBA)

Lotay Tshering (Dzongkha: བློ་གྲོས་ཚེ་རིང་; born 10 May 1969) is a Bhutanese politician and surgeon who served as the prime minister of Bhutan, from 7 November 2018 to 1 November 2023. He was the president of Druk Nyamrup Tshogpa (DNT) political party from 14 May 2018 until his resignation in 2025.

The president of DNT Dasho Dr. Lotay Tshering resigned from the party and politics ending his 11-year political career. Dasho was appointed as the Governor of GMC at Dungkar Dzong in Paro on 1 October 2024 following a recommendation from the Board of Directors of the Gelephu Mindfulness City (GMC).

== Early life and education ==
Tshering was born on 10 May 1969. He hails from Dalukha village, Mewang Gewog, Thimphu.

He received his early education from Punakha High School and graduated from Sherubtse College. He graduated from Mymensingh Medical College and received MBBS degree in 2001. He completed his post-graduation in surgery and received FCPS degree from Bangladesh College of Physicians and Surgeons and MS degree from Bangladesh Medical University.

In 2007, he studied urology at the Medical College of Wisconsin, the US, under his World Health Organization fellowship. Upon his return to Bhutan, he was the only practicing trained urologist in his country. In 2010, he obtained a fellowship in endourology at Singapore General Hospital, Singapore, and Okayama University, Japan. He received a Master of Business Administration degree from University of Canberra, Australia in 2014.

== Personal life ==
Lotay Tshering is married to a doctor, Ugyen Dema. The couple has one daughter and one son (Garab Lotey). During his tenure in Mongar Regional Referral Hospital, he adopted one girl and one boy. Tshering speaks several languages, including Dzongkha, Lotshamkha, Bengali and English.

== Professional career ==
Tshering served as a consultant surgeon in JDWNRH and Mongar Regional Referral Hospital, and was also served as a consultant urologist in JDWNRH for 11 years.

After the payment of about Nu. 6.2 million to the Royal Civil Service Commission, he resigned from the JDWNRH as a urologist to join politics in 2013.

== Political career ==
Tshering contested the 2013 National Assembly Election but his party was knocked out in the primary round.

On 14 May 2018, Tshering received 1,155 votes and was elected as the president of the Druk Nyamrup Tshogpa (DNT) just five months before the Third National Assembly Election.

He was elected to the National Assembly of Bhutan as a candidate of DNT from South Thimphu constituency in 2018 Bhutanese National Assembly election. He received 3,662 votes, defeating Kinley Tshering, a candidate of DPT. His party won largest number of seats in the 2018 National Assembly Election, bringing Tshering to premiership and Druk Nyamrup Tshogpa into government for the first time.

== Prime minister ==
On 7 November 2018, he replaced Tshering Tobgay and was sworn in as the third democratically elected prime minister of Bhutan.

On 27 December 2018, he arrived in India for a three-day visit on his first foreign trip after assuming the office.

On 13 April 2019, he arrived in Bangladesh on an official visit and subsequently on 24 March 2021, on behalf of to celebrate the Golden Jubilee of Bangladesh's independence.

== Cabinet ==
Tshering announced his 10 cabinet ministers on 3 November 2018.

== Awards ==
- 1991: He was awarded the Father William Mackey Gold Medal for academic excellence by Sherubtse College.
- 2005: He was awarded the Unsung Hero of Compassion Award by 14th Dalai Lama.
- 2017: He was awarded the Royal Order of Bhutan Medal (Druk Thuksey) by King Jigme Khesar Namgyel Wangchuck for his "selfless and dedicated service to the Tsawa-Sum (our King, our country and our people)."
- 2018: Royal Orange Scarf by King Jigme Khesar Namgyel Wangchuck for "his appointment as the Prime Minister".
- 2020: Lungmar Scarf by King Jigme Khesar Namgyel Wangchuck for "his unwavering effort and contribution in fighting the ongoing pandemic as the Prime Minister". Tshering is the second person, after former prime minister Dasho Tshering Tobgay, to be awarded this scarf since the creation of this award by the Third King, who was the King of Bhutan between 1952 and 1972.

Political offices
Preceded by Tshering Tobgay	Prime Minister of Bhutan; 2018–2023	Succeeded by Tshering Tobgay
Party political offices
Preceded by Tandi Dorji	President of Druk Nyamrup Tshogpa; 2018–present	Incumbent
