= List of constituencies of the Bhutan National Assembly =

Map showing the location of Bhutan (in green), within South Asia

The Bhutan National Assembly, the lower house of the bicameral Parliament of Bhutan, consists Members of Parliament (MPs). Each MP represents a single geographic constituency. Currently, it has 47 constituencies.

National Assembly constituencies are distributed among the dzongkhags (Note: The word "dzongkhag" translates to "district". In English uses, specific Dzongkha words, including the word "dzongkhag", are italicised and only translated the first time they are used.) in proportion to their registered voter population as recommended by the Delimitation Commission, provided that "no Dzongkhag shall have less than two [or] more than seven National Assembly constituencies." The National Assembly has had four elections, with the first one being in 2008 and the latest one ending in January 2024. During all these elections, the National Assembly has had 47 constituencies.

The constituency of Gelegphu (NA1301) has the highest number of registered voters (16,283), while the Khatoed Laya (NA0402) constituency has the lowest number of registered voters (966). Out of the 20 dzongkhags of Bhutan, Trashigang District, with five constituencies, has the highest number of National Assembly constituencies. Samtse District, with four constituencies, has the second highest number of National Assembly constituencies. Mongar and Pemagatshel Districts, with three constituencies each, share the third highest position. All of the other 16 dzongkhags have two constituencies each.

== List of constituencies ==
A map of Bhutan showing its 20 dzongkhags. Currently, each dzongkhag has between two and five National Assembly constituencies

The table below lists the 47 National Assembly constituencies with the name of the dzongkhag they are in, the number of constituent gewogs, (Note: The word "gewog" translates to "county". In English uses, specific Dzongkha words, including the word "gewog", are italicised and only translated the first time they are used.) and the number of registered voters.

Constituencies of the National Assembly of Bhutan
Code	Name	Dzongkhag (District)	Gewogs	Registered voters (Note: As of 2017-05-08)	Map
NA0101	Chhoekhor Tang	Bumthang	2	5,721	
NA0102	Chhumig Ura	Bumthang	2	3,498	
NA0201	Bongo Chapchha	Chhukha (Note: Also spelled as "Chukha")	5	13,512	
NA0202	Phuentshogling	Chhukha	6	10,228	
NA0301	Drukjeygang Tseza	Dagana	7	11,521	
NA0302	Lhamoi Dzingkha Tashiding	Dagana	7	11,327	
NA0401	Khamaed Lunana	Gasa	2	968	
NA0402	Khatoed Laya	Gasa	2	966	
NA0501	Bji Kar-tshog Uesu	Haa	3	3,982	
NA0502	Sangbaykha	Haa	3	3,361	
NA0601	Gangzur Minjey	Lhuentse (Note: Also spelled as "Lhuntse")	4	7,717	
NA0602	Maenbi Tsaenkhar	Lhuentse	4	7,644	
NA0701	Dramedtse Ngatshang	Mongar (Note: Also spelled as "Monggar")	7	12,600	
NA0702	Kengkhar Weringla	Mongar	5	10,254	
NA0703	Monggar	Mongar	5	10,008	
NA0801	Dokar Sharpa	Paro	4	8,209	
NA0802	Lamgong Wangchang	Paro	6	9,512	
NA0901	Khar Yurung	Pema Gatshel (Note: Also spelled as "Pemagatshel")	5	9,032	
NA0902	Nanong Shumar	Pema Gatshel	3	8,809	
NA0903	Nganglam	Pema Gatshel	3	6,662	
NA1001	Kabisa Talog	Punakha	6	9,293	
NA1002	Lingmukha Toedwang	Punakha	5	6,475	
NA1101	Dewathang Gomdar	Samdrup Jongkhar (Note: Also spelled as "Samdrupjongkhar")	5	13,429	
NA1102	Jomotsangkha Martshala	Samdrup Jongkhar	6	10,153	
NA1201	Dophuchen Tading	Samtse	4	12,536	
NA1202	Phuentshogpelri Samtse	Samtse	3	10,229	
NA1203	Tashichhoeling	Samtse	4	12,376	
NA1204	Ugyentse Yoeseltse	Samtse	4	9,186	
NA1301	Gelegphu	Sarpang	7	16,283	
NA1302	Shompangkha	Sarpang	5	12,451	
NA1401	North Thimphu Thromde Kawang Lingzhi Naro Soe	Thimphu	4	5,446	
NA1402	South Thimphu Thromde Chang Darkarla Ge-nyen Maedwang	Thimphu	4	8,124	
NA1501	Bartsham Shongphu	Trashigang	4	10,688	
NA1502	Kanglung Samkhar Udzorong	Trashigang	3	10,311	
NA1503	Radhi Sagteng	Trashigang	4	9,155	
NA1504	Thrimshing	Trashigang	2	6,550	
NA1505	Wamrong	Trashigang	2	7,821	
NA1601	Boomdeling Jamkhar	Trashi Yangtse (Note: Also spelled as"Trashiyangste")	4	8,793	
NA1602	Khamdang Ramjar	Trashi Yangtse	4	8,740	
NA1701	Draagteng Langthil	Trongsa	3	5,558	
NA1702	Nubi Tangsibji	Trongsa	2	4,163	
NA1801	Kilkhorthang Mendrelgang	Tsirang	6	11,080	
NA1802	Sergithang Tsirangtoed	Tsirang	6	10,527	
NA1901	Athang Thedtsho	Wangdue Phodrang (Note: Also spelled as "Wangduephodrang")	8	9,249	
NA1902	Nyishog Saephu	Wangdue Phodrang	7	9,635	
NA2001	Bardo Trong	Zhemgang	4	10,157	
NA2002	Panbang	Zhemgang	4	7,211	
