= Sonam Tobgye =

Bhutanese jurist and politician

Lyonpo Sonam Tobgye
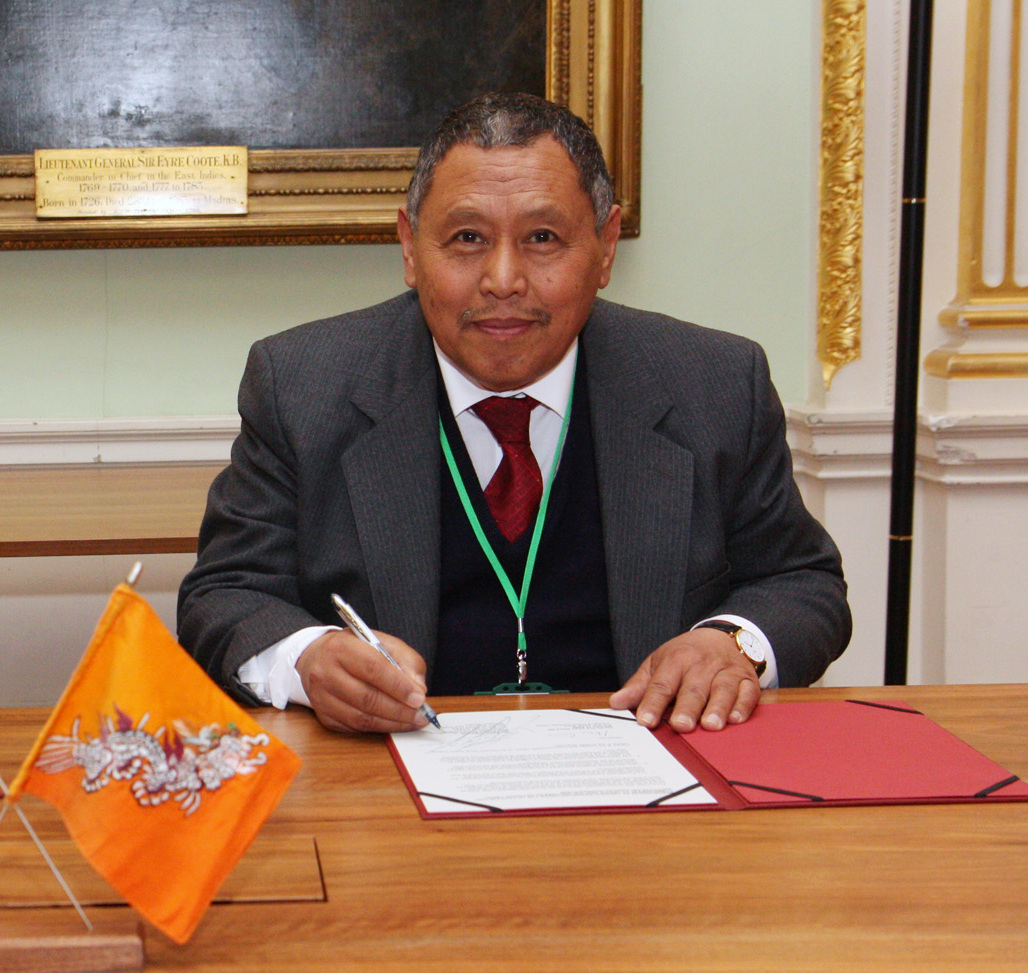
- Sonam Tobgye in 2013

1st Chief Advisor of Bhutan
- In office 28 April 2013 – 27 July 2013
- Monarch: Jigme Khesar Namgyel Wangchuck
- Preceded by: Jigme Thinley (as Prime Minister)
- Succeeded by: Tshering Tobgay (as Prime Minister)

Personal details
- Born: 15 November 1949 (age 76)

Lyonpo Sonam Tobgye (born 15 November 1949) is an eminent jurist from Bhutan. He served as Chief Justice of the High Court of Bhutan from 1991 through 2009 and as Chief Justice of the newly created Supreme Court of Bhutan from 2010 through 2014. He also served as president of SAARCLAW, the South Asian Association for Regional Co-operation in Law, from 2011 through 2014. His public service spanned 43 years, beginning as master of household to King Jigme Dorji Wangchuck and ending in constitutionally-mandated retirement at the age of 65.

During the gap between the administrations of Prime Ministers Jigme Thinley and Tshering Tobgay, he served as Bhutan's head of government as Chief Advisor to the interim government from 28 April to 27 July 2013.

== Honours ==
- Bhutan :
  - The Royal Red Scarf (1974).
  - The Royal Orange Scarf (1991).
  - Member of the Order of Great Victory of the Thunder Dragon (17 December 2008).
- France :
  - Medal of Honor for Judicial Services.

== Social service ==
Lynpo Sonam Tobye is the patron of Dr. Graham's Homes, Kalimpong where he had received his school education

Political offices
| Preceded by Jigme Thinley | Head of Government of Bhutan as Chief Advisor; 2013 | Succeeded by Tshering Tobgay |
| Preceded by none | Chief Justice of the Supreme Court of Bhutan; 2010–2014 | Succeeded by Dasho Tshering Wangchuk |
