= Chief Advisor of Bhutan =

Official position in Bhutan

Chief Advisor
- Emblem of Bhutan
- Style: Chief Advisor
- Appointer: King of Bhutan
- Term length: until the next general election is held and a new Prime Minister takes office
- Inaugural holder: Sonam Tobgye
- Formation: 2013

The Chief Advisor is the head of an interim government of Bhutan following a dissolution of assembly, in preparation for National Assembly elections.

== Chief advisors ==
No.	Portrait	Name (Birth–Death)	Term of office			Political party	Ref.
No.	Portrait	Name (Birth–Death)	Took office	Left office	Time in office	Political party	Ref.
1		Sonam Tobgye (born 1949)	28 April 2013	27 July 2013	90 days	Independent	
2		Tshering Wangchuk (born 19??)	9 August 2018	7 November 2018	90 days	Independent	
3		Chogyal Dago Rigdzin (born 19??)	1 November 2023	28 January 2024	88 days	Independent	
