= Ugen =

Ugen is both a given name and surname. Notable people with the name include:

- Lorraine Ugen (born 1991), English long jumper and sprinter
- Ugen Tenzin (born 1966), Bhutanese politician
