= Tempa Dorji =

Bhutanese politician

Speaker of the National Assembly
- Incumbent
- Assumed office 19 August 2026
- Preceded by: Lungten Dorji

Member of the National Council of Bhutan
- Incumbent
- Assumed office 10 May 2018
- Preceded by: himself
- Constituency: Lhuentse
- In office 2013–2018
- Preceded by: Rinzin Dorji
- Constituency: Lhuentse

Personal details
- Born: 1968 or 1969 (age 57–58)

Tempa Dorji is a Bhutanese politician who has been a member of the National Council of Bhutan, since May 2018. Previously, he was a member of the National Council of Bhutan from 2013 to 2018.
