= Tinley =

Tinley is a surname. Notable people with the surname include:

- Adam Tinley (born 1967), known as Adamski, English DJ, musician, singer and record producer
- Cris Tinley (1830–1900), English cricketer, one of the best slow bowlers of his time
- Mark Tinley (born 1963), British guitarist, programmer, sound engineer and record producer
- Peter Tinley (born 1962), Australian soldier and politician
- Scott Tinley (born 1956), former professional triathlete and twice winner of the Hawaii Ironman endurance race
- Seána Tinley, Irish author

== See also ==
- Tinley Moraine, moraine around the Lake Michigan basin in North America
- Tinley Park, Illinois, village located in Cook and Will County, Illinois, United States
