= Bhutan Kuen-Nyam Party =

Bhutanese social democratic political party

Bhutan Kuen-Nyam Party འབྲུག་ཀུན་མཉམ་ཚོགས་པ།
- Abbreviation: BKP
- Registered: 3 January 2013
- Dissolved: 23 January 2023
- Headquarters: Thimphu
- Ideology: Social democracy; Progressivism
- Political position: Centre-left to left-wing

Election symbol
- Five Colourful Circles

Website
- www.bkp.bt

The Bhutan Kuen-Nyam Party (BKP; Dzongkha: འབྲུག་ཀུན་མཉམ་ཚོགས་པ།, lit. 'Bhutan Everyone-Equal Party') was a social democratic political party in Bhutan. Its President from May 2017 to July 2020 was Dasho Neten Zangmo, who took over from Sonam Tobgay, the President from 2013 to 2017. Neten Zangmo was provisionally replaced by vice-president Sonam Tobgay until a new party convention was held.

The BKP was favourable to same-sex marriage. It included the rights of LGBT+ people in its program for the general election of 2018.

The BKP submitted a request to the Election Commission of Bhutan in January 2023 asking to dissolve the party, following the failure for several years to name a new party president and difficulties in finding candidates for the 2023 election.
