= Neten Zangmo =

Bhutanese government official and politician (born 1961)

Dasho Neten Zangmo
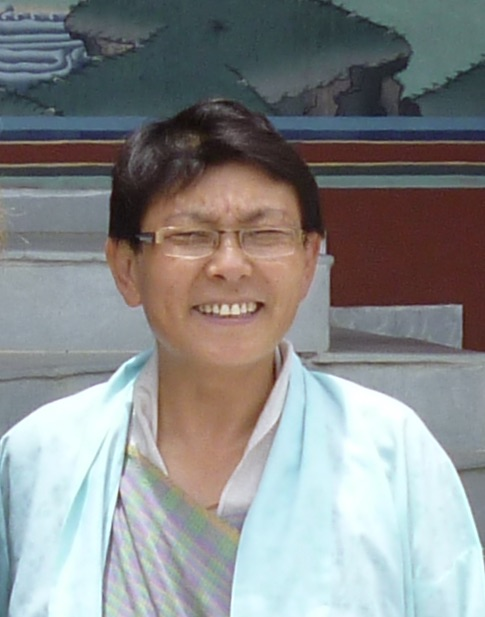
- Born: 23 September 1961 (age 64); Bumthang, Bhutan
- Other name: The Iron Lady of Bhutan
- Occupation: Government official
- Known for: Chairperson of the Anti-Corruption Commission

Neten Zangmo (born 23 September 1961) is a Bhutanese government official and politician. She headed Bhutan's Anti-Corruption Commission, and was bestowed with the title of Dasho in 2009. On 29 May 2017 she became leader of Bhutan Kuen-Nyam Party. She resigned the position on September 16, 2018, the day after the party failed to make the first round of voting to compete in the general election, but it took nearly two years for the BKP to accept her resignation. The party founder, Sonam Tobgay, told Bhutan Broadcasting Service that it would be difficult to replace Zangmo, who he considered the party's biggest asset. "Within the BKP family, we have high respect for her and also have expectations from her.”

== Biography ==
Born in Bumthang and educated at Sherubtse public school in Trashigang, she started working for the Bhutanese state in 1985 as National Service Trainee and later progressed through the ranks of the Ministry of Education. Between 1986 and 1989 she served as the Vice-Principal of the Royal Bhutan Polytechnic; between 1990 and 1992 she served as the Principal. On 19 October 1990, she moved to the Royal Technical Institute, where she was the Principal until 1995. She became the Director of the Planning Commission in 1996 and occupied this post until 1999. Between 1999 and 2003 she served as Secretary in the Cabinet Secretariat; and between 2003 and 2006 as Secretary in the Ministry of Foreign Affairs. She was appointed by King Jigme Singye Wangchuck as the Chairperson of the Anti-Corruption Commission on 4 January 2006.

As head of the Anti-Corruption Commission, she embarked on a fierce anti-corruption campaign, opening cases on many high-profile people. In a country where corruption did not carry a stigma, she worked to raise public awareness at the same time. She faced threats and insults in the process. However, the King of Bhutan, Jigme Khesar Namgyel Wangchuck, supported her and bestowed upon her the title of Dasho, making her the first woman to attain the title.

She has been described as the "Iron Lady of Bhutan" in sources and as "legendary" and "the most important woman in the country" by Bunty Avieson.
