= Tshering Tobgay =

Prime Minister of Bhutan since 2024

Dasho Tshering Tobgay
- ཚེ་རིང་སྟོབས་རྒྱས།
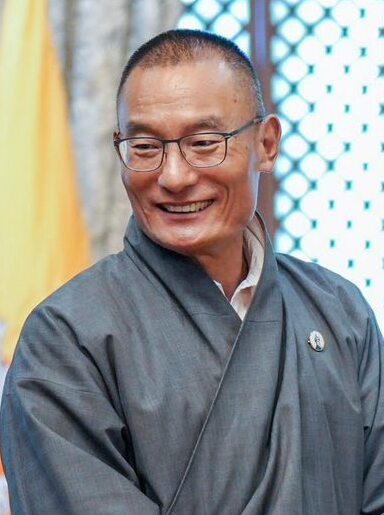
- Tobgay in 2026

7th Prime Minister of Bhutan
- Incumbent
- Assumed office 28 January 2024
- Monarch: Jigme Khesar Namgyel Wangchuck
- Preceded by: Chogyal Dago Rigdzin (as Chief Advisor)
- In office 27 July 2013 – 9 August 2018
- Monarch: Jigme Khesar Namgyel Wangchuck
- Preceded by: Sonam Tobgye (as Chief Advisor)
- Succeeded by: Tshering Wangchuk (as Chief Advisor); Lotay Tshering

Member of the National Assembly of Bhutan
- Incumbent
- Assumed office 25 January 2024
- Constituency: Somgbaykha
- In office 24 March 2008 – 1 August 2018

Personal details
- Born: 19 September 1965 (age 61) Kalimpong, West Bengal, India
- Party: People's Democratic Party (2007–present)
- Spouse: Tashi Dolma (m. 1998)
- Children: 2
- Education: University of Pittsburgh (BS); Harvard University (MPA)

Tshering Tobgay (Note: Dzongkha: ཚེ་རིང་སྟོབས་རྒྱས།) (born 19 September 1965) is a Bhutanese politician who is the seventh prime minister of Bhutan since 2024, having previously held the office from 2013 to 2018. Tobgay is the leader of the People's Democratic Party, and was also the Leader of the Opposition in the National Assembly from March 2008 to April 2013.

== Early life and education ==
Tobgay was born on 19 September 1965 in Kalimpong, India, into a family of six brothers. Both of his parents helped develop the country of Bhutan. Tobgay's father was one of the first soldiers of the Royal Bhutan Army, while his mother participated in the construction of the first road connecting Bhutan to India.

Tobgay attended secondary schooling at the Dr. Graham's Homes School in Kalimpong, India, in the eastern Himalayas.

In 1990, Tobgay received a Bachelor of Science in mechanical engineering from the University of Pittsburgh's Swanson School of Engineering after obtaining a scholarship from the United Nations. Tobgay also completed a master's degree in public administration from the John F. Kennedy School of Government at Harvard University in 2004. Tobgay is schoolmate and good friend of Singaporean Prime Minister Lawrence Wong.

Prior to joining politics, he was serving in the Royal Government of Bhutan as the Director from 2003 to 2007.

== Personal life ==
Tobgay married Tashi Doma in 1998, and has two children. He is an avid cyclist and enjoys fitness, gym and yoga.

== Career ==
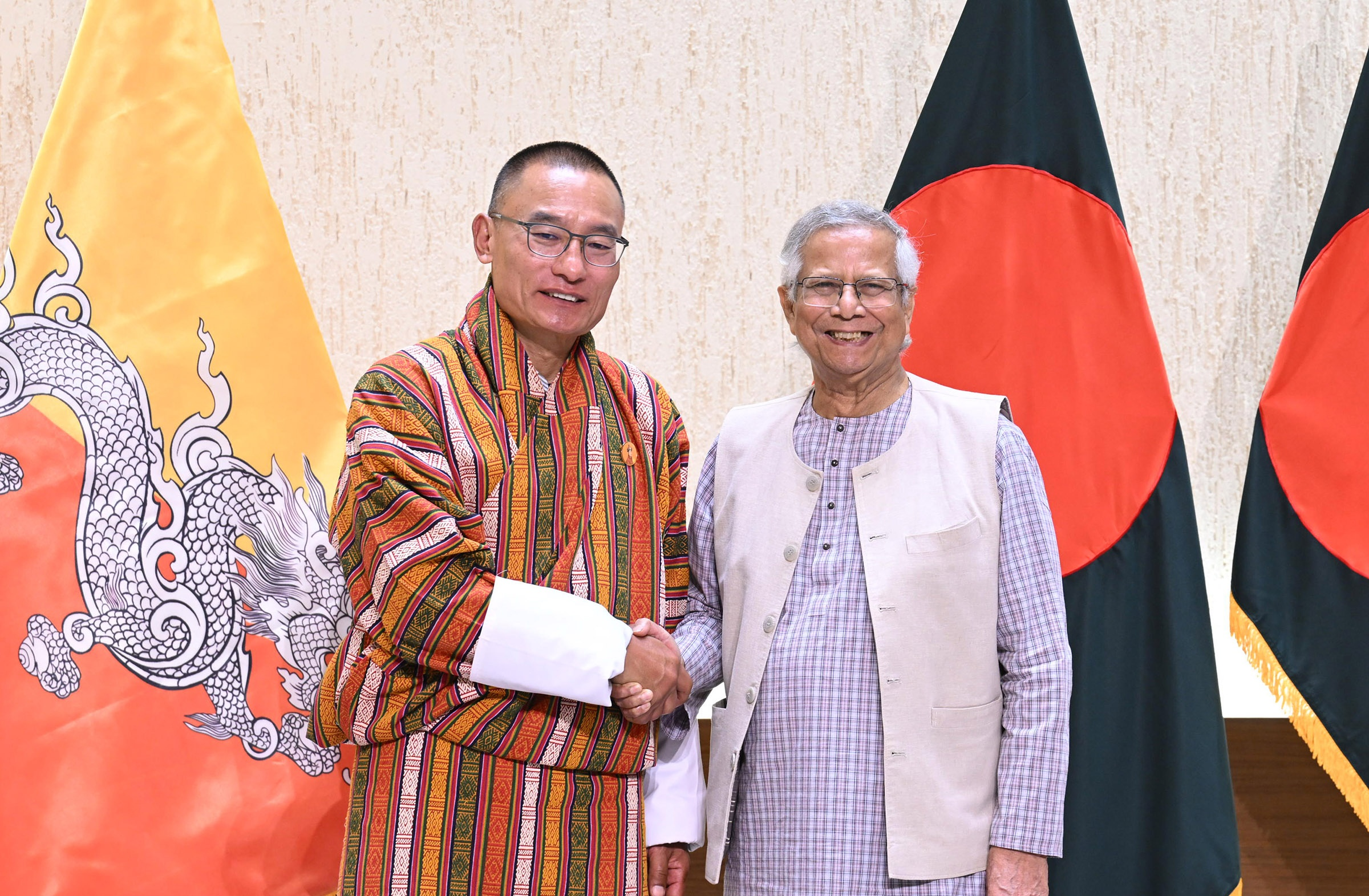
Tobgay with Nobel Peace Laurate and former Chief Adviser of Bangladesh Muhammad Yunus

Tobgay was a civil servant before he engaged in politics. He started his career in 1991 with the Technical and Vocational Education Section (TVES) of the Education Division in Bhutan. After his stint with the TVES from 1991 to 1999, Tobgay created and led the National Technical Training Authority (NTTA) as its Director from May 10, 1999 to June 30, 2003.

Tobgay also served from July 1, 2003 to February 1, 2007. in the Ministry of Labour and Human Resources as the director of the Human Resources department. Tobgay resigned from the Ministry of Labour in February 2007 and entered politics to serve his duties for the reigning king, who established democracy in 2008.

=== Politics ===
Tobgay with Philippines President Bongbong Marcos

Tobgay was a co-founder member of the People's Democratic Party and was responsible for establishing the Party as Bhutan's first registered political party. At the 2008 election, the PDP only obtained two seats, with Tobgay winning one of the seats. In 2009, the PDP's leader Sangay Ngedup resigned from his position, and Tobgay took over as the party's leader. After the 2013 election, Tobgay was elected as Prime Minister of Bhutan by a secret ballot.

After People's Democratic Party (Bhutan) won 30 seats (out of 47) in the 2024 general election, Tshering Tobgay is set to become Prime Minister again.

==== 2013 campaign ====
During Tobgay's campaign in the 2013 election, Tobgay focused on improving Bhutan with small promises. Instead of following in his predecessor's footsteps and promoting the Gross National Happiness, Tobgay pledged to give each village a power tiller, utility vehicles for each district and two national ambulance helicopters. Tobgay's election campaign focused on improving the economy which had then fallen to a record low of 2%. The campaign also promised strengthening the rural economy, reforming the education sector, and empowering local government.

==== Ideologies ====
Rather than simply promoting Gross National Happiness, Tobgay believes that the principles of GNH have to be implemented, and some of the important problems that need to be addressed are youth unemployment, corruption, and national debt. Tobgay also concentrates on stopping corruption in Bhutan's government, and interacting with the Bhutanese population. Human rights is also an ideology of Tobgay, however, he has not spoken publicly about LGBT rights in Bhutan, where homosexual acts were formerly illegal, since an anti-gay law was imposed by British colonialists.

== Speeches ==
In 2015, Tobgay delivered a speech at Vibrant Gujarat, inviting leading corporates from across the globe to participate in business with Bhutan.

At a 2015 TED talk titled TEDxThimphu, Tobgay spoke about happiness and how common the theme of happiness was in other Ted Talks, including by Nancy Etcoff, and Silver Donald Cameron. In his speech, Tobgay emphasized that having a sense of purpose, identity, and security is important to become happy.

On 9 January 2019, Tobgay spoke at the Oxford Poverty and Human Development Initiative (OPHI) on the first ten years of democracy in Bhutan.

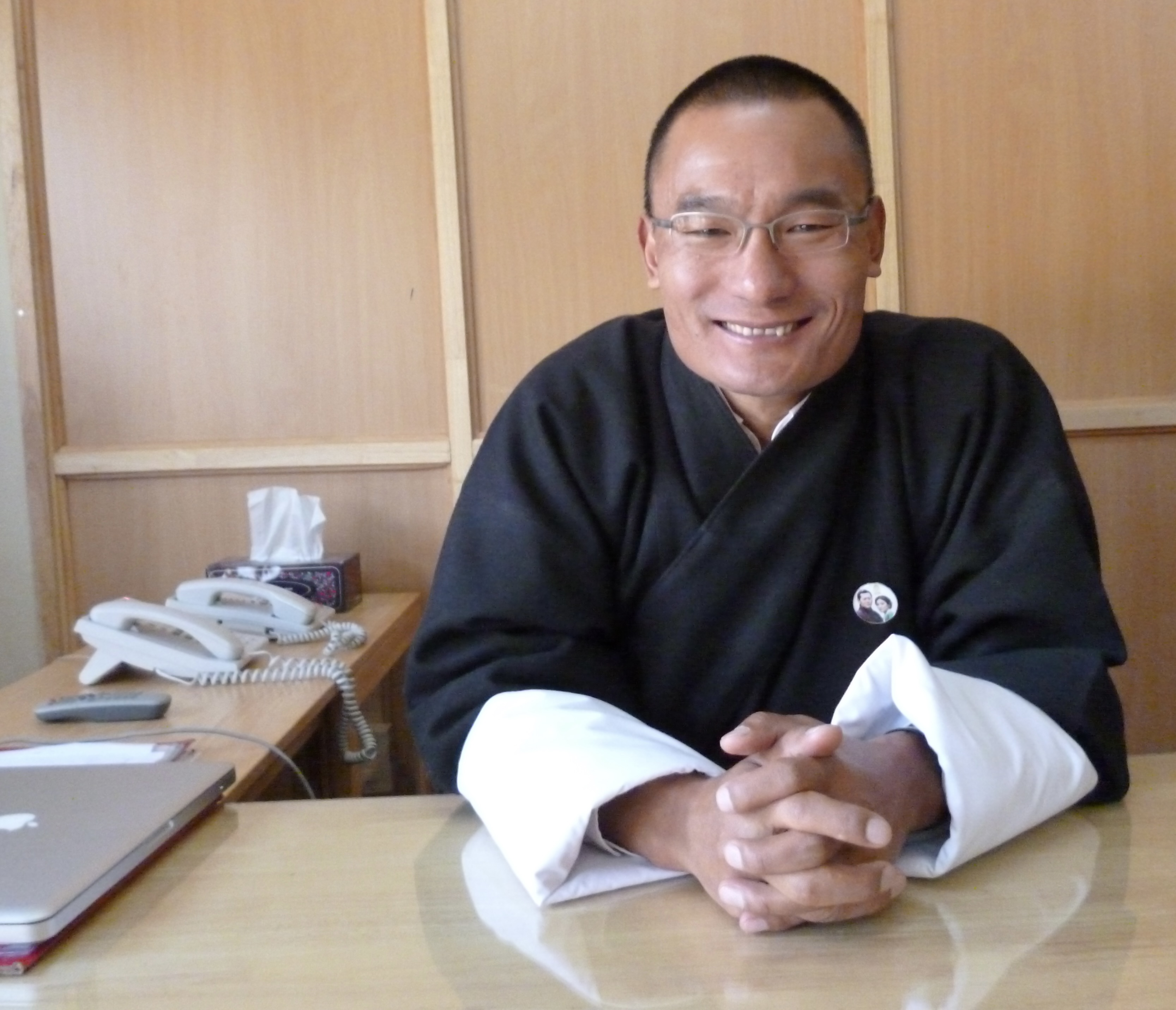
Tshering Tobgay in his parliamentary office in 2011

== Accolades ==
On 17 December 2014, the King of Bhutan presented Tobgay with the Lungmar Scarf for his efforts in the well-being of the nation while being Prime Minister of Bhutan.

== Honours ==
- Bhutan :
  - The Royal Orange Scarf (16 June 2008).
  - The Royal Red Scarf (17 December 2014).

== Awards ==
Tobgay was awarded the German Sustainability Award (GSA) for his outstanding contributions to promoting sustainability in Bhutan. This recognition was presented at an event in Düsseldorf, Germany, on November 25, 2016. He also received the Distinguished Leadership Award (2022) from the United Nations Hospitality Committee for UN Delegations during the Ambassadors’ Ball on December 10, 2022. This award honors individuals for their selfless contributions toward humanity in various fields, including conservation and humanitarian efforts.

== Notes ==
Political offices
| Preceded by Sonam Tobgye as Chief Advisor | Prime Minister of Bhutan; 2013–2018 | Succeeded by Dasho Tshering Wangchuk as Chief Advisor |
