= Ugyen Dorji (footballer) =

Bhutanese footballer

Personal information
- Full name: Ugyen Dorji
- Date of birth: December 23, 1992 (age 33)
- Place of birth: Bhutan
- Position: Forward

Senior career*
Years	Team	Apps	(Gls)
2003–2005	Thimphu		
2005–	Transport United		

International career
2011–	Bhutan	2	(0)
- * Club domestic league appearances and goals

Ugyen Dorji is a Bhutanese professional footballer who currently plays for Transport United. He made his first appearance for the Bhutan national football team in 2011.
