= People's Democratic Party (Bhutan) =

Political party in Bhutan

People's Democratic Party མི་སེར་དམངས་གཙོའི་ཚོགས་པ།
- Abbreviation: PDP
- President: Tshering Tobgay
- Founders: Sangay Ngedup; Tshering Tobgay
- Founded: 24 March 2007 (19 years ago)
- Headquarters: Drizang Lam, Lower Motithang, Thimphu
- Ideology: Liberalism; Royalism
- Political position: Centre-left
- Seats in the National Assembly: 31 / 47

Election symbol
- Galloping White Horse

The People's Democratic Party (Dzongkha: མི་སེར་དམངས་གཙོའི་ཚོགས་པ།; Wylie: mi-ser dmangs-gtsoi tshogs-pa; abbr. PDP) is one of the major political parties in Bhutan, formed on 24 March 2007. The founder president of this party is Sangay Ngedup, the former prime minister and agriculture minister of the Royal Government of Bhutan. The current leader of the party is Tshering Tobgay. The People's Democratic Party submitted its application for registration on 6 August 2007 and thus became the first political party in Bhutan to do so. On 1 September 2007 the Election Commission of Bhutan registered the party. The PDP tends to be more popular in the west of the country.

The party presented candidates for the 2008 National Assembly election in all 47 constituencies. The party won only two of the National Assembly's 47 seats, and just under one third of the votes cast. The only other party that registered for the election, the Bhutan Peace and Prosperity Party, gained 45 seats and just over two thirds of the votes. The People's Democratic Party's president, Sangay Ngedup, failed to win the seat in his own constituency.

In the 2013 elections, the party won 32 seats with 54.88% of the votes.

PDP's election victory is attributed to its comprehensive campaign promises. The campaign promise focused on improving the country's economy which has recorded a real GDP growth rate of 2%, the lowest in the recent 20 years. Confidence in the economy was at its weakest with rupee shortages, raising debt, loans being stopped by financial institutions and corruption having become a major concern.

The party came in 3rd place in the 2018 first-round primary elections, thus losing all its seats.

== Election results ==
=== National Assembly ===
Election	First round		Second round		Seats	+/–	Outcome
Election	Votes	%	Votes	%	Seats	+/–	Outcome
2008	83,322	32.96%	Cancelled		2 / 47	New	Opposition
2013	68,650	32.53%	138,760	54.88%	32 / 47	▲30	Supermajority
2018	79,883	27.44%	Did not qualify		0 / 47	▼32	Extra-parliamentary
2023–24	133,217	42.54%	179,652	54.98%	30 / 47	▲30	Majority

== See also ==
- List of major liberal parties considered left
- List of political parties in Bhutan
- 2013 Bhutanese National Assembly election
