= 2013 Bhutanese National Assembly election =

- 31 May 2013 (first round); 13 July 2013 (second round)

All 47 seats in the National Assembly 24 seats needed for a majority
- Turnout: 66%
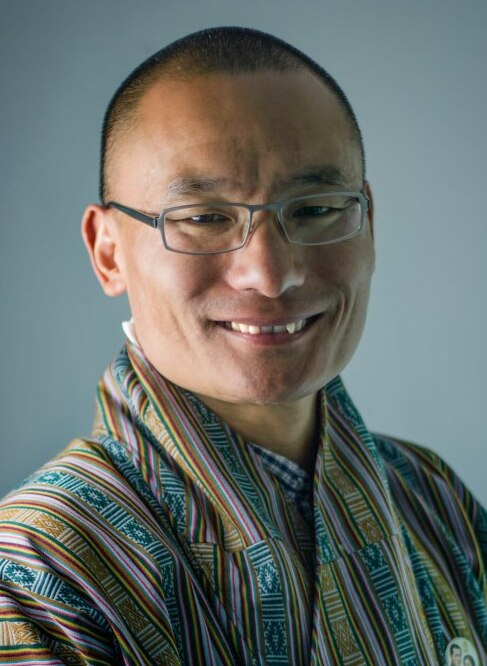

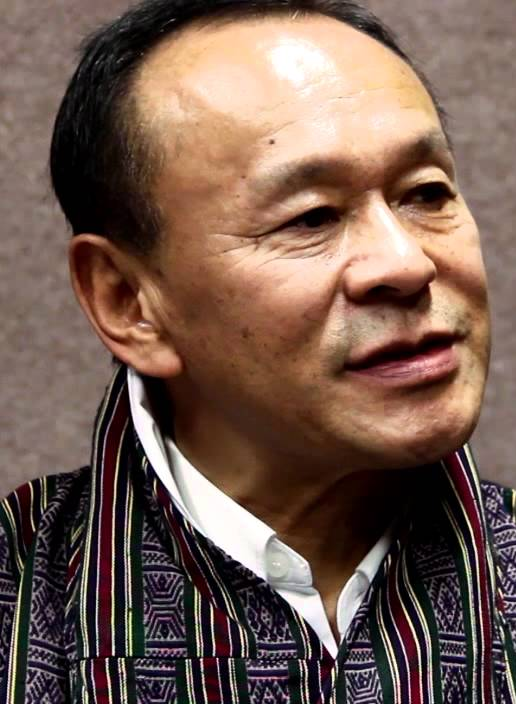
	First party	Second party
Leader	Tshering Tobgay	Jigme Thinley
Party	PDP	DPT
Last election	2 seats, 32.96%	45 seats, 67.04%
Seats won	32	15
Seat change	▲30	▼30
Popular vote	138,558	113,927
Percentage	54.88%	45.12%
Swing	▲21.92pp	▼21.92pp
Prime Minister before election
Jigme Thinley
DPT
Prime Minister-designate
Tshering Tobgay
PDP

National Assembly elections were held in Bhutan on 31 May and 13 July 2013. The result was a victory for the opposition People's Democratic Party (PDP), which won 32 of the 47 seats. The elections were the second general elections to occur in Bhutan since former King Jigme Singye Wangchuck ushered in democratic reforms.

== Background ==
By law, the National Assembly is required to be reconstituted within 90 days of its previous term expiring. As the term of the Assembly elected in 2008 expired on 20 April 2013, this meant that the new Assembly would need to have been elected by 20 July.

== Electoral system ==
The election was held in two rounds. In the first round every party contested all 20 Dzongkhags (the administrative and judicial districts of Bhutan). The parties with the two highest vote tallies progressed to the second round, in which they put forward candidates in each of the 47 National Assembly constituencies. In the first round of the elections, the Bhutan Peace and Prosperity Party had received roughly 40% of votes and the People's Democratic Party received approximately 30%, with two other parties sharing the other 30% of the votes.

A total of 381,790 voters were registered for the election. The election date for the first round was made a public holiday, with all businesses required to close on the day. Over 4,000 electronic voting machines were provided by India for the election.

== Campaign ==
Four parties contested the election; the ruling Bhutan Peace and Prosperity Party (DPT), the main opposition People's Democratic Party, and two new parties, Druk Nymrub Tshogpa and Druck Chirwang Tshogpa. A fifth party, the Bhutan Kuen-Nyam Party, attempted to participate in the election, but failed to field a university-educated candidate in Gasa District in the northern part of the country. Consequently, the Bhutanese Elections Commission disqualified the party, even though each of the four other parties had made official requests to the commission to allow the Bhutan Kuen-Nyam Party to participate. The head of the party, Sonam Tobgay, stated that "Four parties appealing for the fifth party, who couldn’t qualify, is something unprecedented universally and internationally, something special and noble." The DPT campaigned for the support of rural communities having improved access to roads, mobile phone networks and electricity during its tenure.

Ties with India had recently come under strain after it cut subsidised cooking gas and kerosene to Bhutan, viewed as a punishment for developing ties with China. This tripled the cost of fuel and made relations between the two neighbours a major electoral issue. The consequent rise in fuel prices was coupled with a credit crunch and import restrictions after the country ran short of foreign exchange reserves of the Indian rupee. The People's Democratic Party had campaigned on a platform of stronger relations with India and a decentralisation of powers, devolving control through local government.

== Results ==
The voting process was a challenge due to the mountainous terrain as officials had to trek for seven days to set up some polling stations.

As a result of the election, Tshering Tobgay is expected to be named Prime Minister of the new government, to form once a 10-day "petition period" for electoral complaints to be heard has finished. Three women were elected, with Dorji Choden of the PDP expected to be Bhutan's first female minister.

Party	First round		Second round		Seats	+/–
Party	Votes	%	Votes	%	Seats	+/–
People's Democratic Party	68,650	32.53	138,558	54.88	32	+30
Druk Phuensum Tshogpa	93,949	44.52	113,927	45.12	15	−30
Druk Nyamrup Tshogpa	35,962	17.04			0	New
Druk Chirwang Tshogpa	12,457	5.90			0	New
Total	211,018	100.00	252,485	100.00	47	0
Total votes	211,018	–	252,485	–		
Registered voters/turnout	381,790	55.27	381,790	66.13		
Source: Election Commission of Bhutan

== Reactions and analysis ==
Prime Minister of India Manmohan Singh sent the PDP a message of congratulations, assuring Bhutan of India's "steadfast and unflinching support."

The PDP victory was considered an upset by the media.
