= Druk Nyamrup Tshogpa =

Major political party in Bhutan

Druk Nyamrup Tshogpa འབྲུག་མཉམ་རུབ་ཚོགས་པ།
- Abbreviation: DNT
- President: Lotay Tshering
- Vice President: Sherub Gyeltshen
- Deputy Leader: Karma Dorji
- Spokesperson: Tandi Dorji
- Founders: Tenzin Lekphell; Karma Dorji; Tandi Dorji
- Founded: 20 January 2013 (13 years ago)
- Headquarters: Thimphu, Bhutan
- Ideology: Social democracy
- Political position: Centre-left
- Slogan: "Narrowing the gap"
- Seats in the National Assembly: 0 / 47

Election symbol
- Peach blossom

Druk Nyamrup Tshogpa (Dzongkha: འབྲུག་མཉམ་རུབ་ཚོགས་པ།; Wylie: ’brug nyam-rub tshogs-pa; lit. 'Bhutan United Party'), formerly the Social Democratic Party, is one of the five registered political parties in Bhutan. It was registered on 20 January 2013. The DNT was Bhutan's governing party from 2018 to 2023.

== Electoral performance ==
Druk Nyamrup Tshogpa contested the National Assembly elections of 2013, 2018 and 2023.

=== 2013 National Assembly election ===
In the primary round of the 2nd National Assembly elections held in 2013, the DNT had 35,962 votes and came third place, and so could not take part in the final round. However the then party president, Aum Dorji Choden, who placed first in her constituency, as well as several other DNT candidates who placed second in their own constituencies, resigned from the party to become successful candidates for the People's Democratic Party in the final round.

=== 2018 National Assembly election ===
In the 2018 elections, the party won 30 seats with 54.95% of the votes.

=== 2023–24 National Assembly election ===
The party failed to advance to the second round of the 2023–24 elections.

== Election results ==
=== National Assembly ===
| Election | First round | | Second round | | Seats | +/– | Outcome |
| Election | Votes | % | Votes | % | Seats | +/– | Outcome |
|---|---|---|---|---|---|---|---|
| 2013 | 35,962 | 17.04% | Did not qualify | | 0 / 47 | New | Extra-parliamentary |
| 2018 | 92,722 | 31.85% | 172,268 | 54.95% | 30 / 47 | ▲30 | Government |
| 2023–24 | 41,106 | 13.13% | Did not qualify | | 0 / 47 | ▼30 | Extra-parliamentary |
