= 2018 Bhutanese National Assembly election =

- 15 September 2018 (first round); 18 October 2018 (second round)

All 47 seats in the National Assembly 24 seats needed for a majority
- Turnout: 71.46%
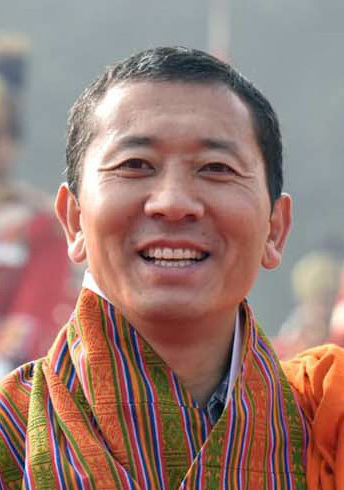

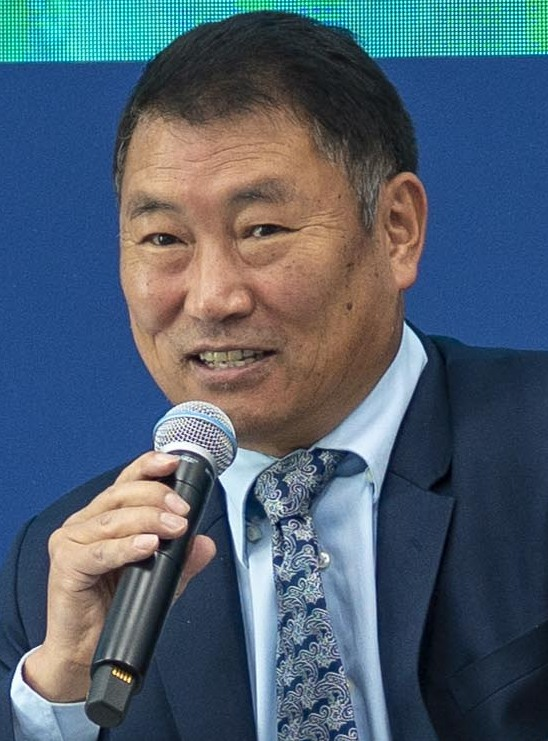
	First party	Second party
Leader	Lotay Tshering	Pema Gyamtsho
Party	DNT	DPT
Last election	17.04%, 0 seats	45.12%, 15 seats
Seats won	30	17
Seat change	▲30	▲2
Popular vote	172,268	141,205
Percentage	54.95%	45.05%
Swing	▲37.91pp	▲0.07pp
Prime Minister before election
Tshering Tobgay
PDP
Prime Minister
Lotay Tshering
DNT

National Assembly elections were held in Bhutan in 2018; the first round was held on 15 September and the second round on 18 October.

The ruling People's Democratic Party of former Prime Minister Tshering Tobgay came third in the first round of voting, unexpectedly failing to advance to the second round and resulting in it losing all 32 seats. The second round was a contest between the Druk Phuensum Tshogpa, the only other party with parliamentary representation, and the unrepresented Druk Nyamrup Tshogpa, which received the most votes in the first round.

== Electoral system ==
The 47 members of the National Assembly are elected from single-member constituencies. Primary elections are held in which voters cast votes for parties. The top two parties are then able to field candidates in the main round of voting, in which members are elected using first-past-the-post voting.

== Results ==
Party	First round		Second round		Seats	+/–
Party	Votes	%	Votes	%	Seats	+/–
Druk Nyamrup Tshogpa	92,722	31.85	172,268	54.95	30	+30
Druk Phuensum Tshogpa	90,020	30.92	141,205	45.05	17	+2
People's Democratic Party	79,883	27.44			0	–32
Bhutan Kuen-Nyam Party	28,473	9.78			0	New
Total	291,098	100.00	313,473	100.00	47	0
Total votes	291,098	–	313,473	–		
Registered voters/turnout	438,663	66.36	438,663	71.46		
Source: Election Commission of Bhutan

=== By constituency ===
Constituency	Electorate	First round			Second round		
Constituency	Electorate	Party	Votes	%	Candidate	Votes	%
Athang-Thedtsho	9,918	Druk Nyamrup Tshogpa	2,131		Kinley Wangchuk	4,001	
Athang-Thedtsho	9,918	Druk Phuensum Tshogpa	1,813		Nim Gyeltshen	3,134	
Athang-Thedtsho	9,918	People's Democratic Party	2,336				
Athang-Thedtsho	9,918	Bhutan Kuen-Nyam Party	778				
Bardo-Trong	10,789	Druk Phuensum Tshogpa	2,358		Gyambo Tshering	3,633	
Bardo-Trong	10,789	Druk Nyamrup Tshogpa	1,581		Sonam Leki	3,507	
Bardo-Trong	10,789	People's Democratic Party	2,254				
Bardo-Trong	10,789	Bhutan Kuen-Nyam Party	796				
Bartsham-Shongphu	11,302	Druk Phuensum Tshogpa	2,741		Passang Dorji	4,099	
Bartsham-Shongphu	11,302	Druk Nyamrup Tshogpa	2,404		Tenzin Lekphell	3,561	
Bartsham-Shongphu	11,302	People's Democratic Party	1,941				
Bartsham-Shongphu	11,302	Bhutan Kuen-Nyam Party	382				
Bji-Kar-Tshog-Uesu	4,173	Druk Nyamrup Tshogpa	964		Ugen Tenzin	1,879	
Bji-Kar-Tshog-Uesu	4,173	Druk Phuensum Tshogpa	370		Sonam Tobgay	888	
Bji-Kar-Tshog-Uesu	4,173	People's Democratic Party	1,185				
Bji-Kar-Tshog-Uesu	4,173	Bhutan Kuen-Nyam Party	441				
Bongo-Chapchha	14,320	Druk Nyamrup Tshogpa	3,139		Tshewang Lhamo	6,632	
Bongo-Chapchha	14,320	Druk Phuensum Tshogpa	1,273		Pempa	3,479	
Bongo-Chapchha	14,320	People's Democratic Party	4,413				
Bongo-Chapchha	14,320	Bhutan Kuen-Nyam Party	822				
Boomdeling-Jamkhar	9,212	Druk Phuensum Tshogpa	1,471		Dupthob	3,541	
Boomdeling-Jamkhar	9,212	Druk Nyamrup Tshogpa	2,701		Sangay Dorji	2,710	
Boomdeling-Jamkhar	9,212	People's Democratic Party	1,567				
Boomdeling-Jamkhar	9,212	Bhutan Kuen-Nyam Party	402				
Chhoekhor-Tang	6,051	Druk Phuensum Tshogpa	2,540		Pema Gyamtsho	3,251	
Chhoekhor-Tang	6,051	Druk Nyamrup Tshogpa	921		Dawa	1,536	
Chhoekhor-Tang	6,051	People's Democratic Party	1,048				
Chhoekhor-Tang	6,051	Bhutan Kuen-Nyam Party	237				
Chhumig-Ura	3,785	Druk Phuensum Tshogpa	968		Karma Wangchuk	1,433	
Chhumig-Ura	3,785	Druk Nyamrup Tshogpa	699		Phuntsho Namgey	1,415	
Chhumig-Ura	3,785	People's Democratic Party	894				
Chhumig-Ura	3,785	Bhutan Kuen-Nyam Party	235				
Dewathang-Gomdar	14,587	Druk Phuensum Tshogpa	4,020		Ugyen Dorji	5,367	
Dewathang-Gomdar	14,587	Druk Nyamrup Tshogpa	2,432		Thinley Namgay	5,144	
Dewathang-Gomdar	14,587	People's Democratic Party	1,880				
Dewathang-Gomdar	14,587	Bhutan Kuen-Nyam Party	1,506				
Dokar-Sharpa	8,684	Druk Nyamrup Tshogpa	2,528		Namgay Tshering	4,155	
Dokar-Sharpa	8,684	Druk Phuensum Tshogpa	1,009		Chencho Dorji	2,112	
Dokar-Sharpa	8,684	People's Democratic Party	2,389				
Dokar-Sharpa	8,684	Bhutan Kuen-Nyam Party	606				
Dophuchen-Tading	13,231	Druk Nyamrup Tshogpa	2,453		Loknath Sharma	5,069	
Dophuchen-Tading	13,231	Druk Phuensum Tshogpa	2,679		Thakur Singh Powdyel	4,532	
Dophuchen-Tading	13,231	People's Democratic Party	1,648				
Dophuchen-Tading	13,231	Bhutan Kuen-Nyam Party	958				
Draagteng-Langthil	5,879	Druk Nyamrup Tshogpa	1,299		Gyem Dorji	1,979	
Draagteng-Langthil	5,879	Druk Phuensum Tshogpa	897		Ugyen Namgyal	1,906	
Draagteng-Langthil	5,879	People's Democratic Party	1,305				
Draagteng-Langthil	5,879	Bhutan Kuen-Nyam Party	452				
Dramedtse-Ngatshang	13,278	Druk Phuensum Tshogpa	4,694		Ugyen Wangdi	5,602	
Dramedtse-Ngatshang	13,278	Druk Nyamrup Tshogpa	1,844		Jigme Dorji	3,690	
Dramedtse-Ngatshang	13,278	People's Democratic Party	1,644				
Dramedtse-Ngatshang	13,278	Bhutan Kuen-Nyam Party	853				
Drukjeygang-Tseza	12,505	Druk Nyamrup Tshogpa	2,929		Jurmi Wangchuk	6,087	
Drukjeygang-Tseza	12,505	Druk Phuensum Tshogpa	1,152		Migma Dorji	2,939	
Drukjeygang-Tseza	12,505	People's Democratic Party	2,642				
Drukjeygang-Tseza	12,505	Bhutan Kuen-Nyam Party	1,111				
Gangzur-Minjey	8,395	Druk Nyamrup Tshogpa	2,134		Kinga Penjor	3,026	
Gangzur-Minjey	8,395	Druk Phuensum Tshogpa	1,504		Tshering Dorji	2,638	
Gangzur-Minjey	8,395	People's Democratic Party	1,302				
Gangzur-Minjey	8,395	Bhutan Kuen-Nyam Party	507				
Gelegphu	17,242	Druk Nyamrup Tshogpa	3,488		Karma Donnen Wangdi	6,691	
Gelegphu	17,242	Druk Phuensum Tshogpa	3,368		Pema Tashi	5,433	
Gelegphu	17,242	People's Democratic Party	2,436				
Gelegphu	17,242	Bhutan Kuen-Nyam Party	1,466				
Jomotshangkha-Martshala	11,239	Druk Phuensum Tshogpa	3,361		Norbu Wangzom	4,372	
Jomotshangkha-Martshala	11,239	Druk Nyamrup Tshogpa	1,565		Ugyen Dorji	3,547	
Jomotshangkha-Martshala	11,239	People's Democratic Party	1,961				
Jomotshangkha-Martshala	11,239	Bhutan Kuen-Nyam Party	604				
Kabisa-Talog	10,015	Druk Nyamrup Tshogpa	2,284		Tshencho Wangdi	4,294	
Kabisa-Talog	10,015	Druk Phuensum Tshogpa	1,193		Kinley Wangchuk	2,459	
Kabisa-Talog	10,015	People's Democratic Party	2,738				
Kabisa-Talog	10,015	Bhutan Kuen-Nyam Party	639				
Kanglung-Samkhar-Udzorong	11,125	Druk Phuensum Tshogpa	2,741		Samdrup R Wangchuk	3,866	
Kanglung-Samkhar-Udzorong	11,125	Druk Nyamrup Tshogpa	2,350		Tenzin Namgyel	3,838	
Kanglung-Samkhar-Udzorong	11,125	People's Democratic Party	1,941				
Kanglung-Samkhar-Udzorong	11,125	Bhutan Kuen-Nyam Party	450				
Kengkhar-Weringla	10,856	Druk Phuensum Tshogpa	3,487		Rinzin Jamtsho	4,385	
Kengkhar-Weringla	10,856	Druk Nyamrup Tshogpa	2,292		Kunzang Drukpa	3,246	
Kengkhar-Weringla	10,856	People's Democratic Party	956				
Kengkhar-Weringla	10,856	Bhutan Kuen-Nyam Party	485				
Khamdang-Ramjar	9,176	Druk Phuensum Tshogpa	2,742		Kuenga Loday	3,602	
Khamdang-Ramjar	9,176	Druk Nyamrup Tshogpa	1,770		Karma Gyeltshen	2,821	
Khamdang-Ramjar	9,176	People's Democratic Party	1,242				
Khamdang-Ramjar	9,176	Bhutan Kuen-Nyam Party	418				
Khamaed-Lunana	1,041	Druk Nyamrup Tshogpa	198		Yeshley Dem	419	
Khamaed-Lunana	1,041	Druk Phuensum Tshogpa	107		Dhendup	361	
Khamaed-Lunana	1,041	People's Democratic Party	339				
Khamaed-Lunana	1,041	Bhutan Kuen-Nyam Party	65				
Khar-Yurung	9,589	Druk Phuensum Tshogpa	4,066		Tshering Chhoden	4,738	
Khar-Yurung	9,589	Druk Nyamrup Tshogpa	1,489		Ugyen Tshewang	2,045	
Khar-Yurung	9,589	People's Democratic Party	411				
Khar-Yurung	9,589	Bhutan Kuen-Nyam Party	393				
Khatoed-Laya	1,023	Druk Nyamrup Tshogpa	407		Tenzin	588	
Khatoed-Laya	1,023	Druk Phuensum Tshogpa	85		Changa Dawa	268	
Khatoed-Laya	1,023	People's Democratic Party	278				
Khatoed-Laya	1,023	Bhutan Kuen-Nyam Party	50				
Kilkhorthang-Mendrelgang	12,151	Druk Nyamrup Tshogpa	3,073		Bimal Thapa	6,681	
Kilkhorthang-Mendrelgang	12,151	Druk Phuensum Tshogpa	1,419		Yangkhu Tshering Sherpa	2,965	
Kilkhorthang-Mendrelgang	12,151	People's Democratic Party	2,435				
Kilkhorthang-Mendrelgang	12,151	Bhutan Kuen-Nyam Party	760				
Lamgong-Wangchang	10,000	Druk Nyamrup Tshogpa	2,113		Ugyen Tshering	3,566	
Lamgong-Wangchang	10,000	Druk Phuensum Tshogpa	2,387		Phub Tshering	3,496	
Lamgong-Wangchang	10,000	People's Democratic Party	2,081				
Lamgong-Wangchang	10,000	Bhutan Kuen-Nyam Party	539				
Lhamoi Dzingkha-Tashiding	12,065	Druk Nyamrup Tshogpa	3,135		Hemant Gurung	6,257	
Lhamoi Dzingkha-Tashiding	12,065	Druk Phuensum Tshogpa	874		Prem Kumar Khatiwara	2,588	
Lhamoi Dzingkha-Tashiding	12,065	People's Democratic Party	2,520				
Lhamoi Dzingkha-Tashiding	12,065	Bhutan Kuen-Nyam Party	634				
Lingmukha-Toedwang	6,934	Druk Nyamrup Tshogpa	1,985		Tandi Dorji	3,154	
Lingmukha-Toedwang	6,934	Druk Phuensum Tshogpa	1,337		Sonam Wangyel Wang	2,082	
Lingmukha-Toedwang	6,934	People's Democratic Party	1,196				
Lingmukha-Toedwang	6,934	Bhutan Kuen-Nyam Party	605				
Maenbi-Tsaenkhar	8,186	Druk Phuensum Tshogpa	1,951		Choki Gyeltshen	2,941	
Maenbi-Tsaenkhar	8,186	Druk Nyamrup Tshogpa	1,620		Tshering Phuntsho	2,579	
Maenbi-Tsaenkhar	8,186	People's Democratic Party	1,216				
Maenbi-Tsaenkhar	8,186	Bhutan Kuen-Nyam Party	440				
Monggar	10,455	Druk Nyamrup Tshogpa	2,056		Sherub Gyeltshen	3,763	
Monggar	10,455	Druk Phuensum Tshogpa	2,601		Karma Lhamo	3,686	
Monggar	10,455	People's Democratic Party	2,045				
Monggar	10,455	Bhutan Kuen-Nyam Party	584				
Nanong-Shumar	9,457	Druk Phuensum Tshogpa	3,516		Lungten Namgyel	4,311	
Nanong-Shumar	9,457	Druk Nyamrup Tshogpa	1,513		Pema Wangda	2,132	
Nanong-Shumar	9,457	People's Democratic Party	845				
Nanong-Shumar	9,457	Bhutan Kuen-Nyam Party	482				
Nganglam	7,095	Druk Phuensum Tshogpa	3,516		Choida Jamtsho	3,576	
Nganglam	7,095	Druk Nyamrup Tshogpa	1,513		Karma Dorji	1,976	
Nganglam	7,095	People's Democratic Party	516				
Nganglam	7,095	Bhutan Kuen-Nyam Party	223				
North Thimphu-Thromde-Kawang-Lingzhi-Naro-Soe	6,604	Druk Nyamrup Tshogpa	1,211		Dechen Wangmo	2,276	
North Thimphu-Thromde-Kawang-Lingzhi-Naro-Soe	6,604	Druk Phuensum Tshogpa	1,134		Lily Wangchuk	2,102	
North Thimphu-Thromde-Kawang-Lingzhi-Naro-Soe	6,604	People's Democratic Party	1,333				
North Thimphu-Thromde-Kawang-Lingzhi-Naro-Soe	6,604	Bhutan Kuen-Nyam Party	540				
Nubi-Tangsibji	4,371	Druk Nyamrup Tshogpa	1,150		Yeshey Penjor	1,677	
Nubi-Tangsibji	4,371	Druk Phuensum Tshogpa	1,014		Nidup Zangpo	1,537	
Nubi-Tangsibji	4,371	People's Democratic Party	659				
Nubi-Tangsibji	4,371	Bhutan Kuen-Nyam Party	326				
Nyishog-Saephu	10,166	Druk Nyamrup Tshogpa	3,033		Wangchuk Namgyel	4,388	
Nyishog-Saephu	10,166	Druk Phuensum Tshogpa	1,208		Chimmi Jamtsho	3,061	
Nyishog-Saephu	10,166	People's Democratic Party	2,530				
Nyishog-Saephu	10,166	Bhutan Kuen-Nyam Party	935				
Pangbang	7,778	Druk Phuensum Tshogpa	2,559		Dorji Wangdi	2,984	
Pangbang	7,778	Druk Nyamrup Tshogpa	1,151		Tshering	2,525	
Pangbang	7,778	People's Democratic Party	1,241				
Pangbang	7,778	Bhutan Kuen-Nyam Party	333				
Phuentshogling	10,737	Druk Nyamrup Tshogpa	2,685		Jai Bir Rai	5,586	
Phuentshogling	10,737	Druk Phuensum Tshogpa	983		Tashi	2,380	
Phuentshogling	10,737	People's Democratic Party	2,364				
Phuentshogling	10,737	Bhutan Kuen-Nyam Party	801				
Phentshogpelri-Samtse	10,806	Druk Nyamrup Tshogpa	2,045		Ganesh Ghimiray	5,332	
Phentshogpelri-Samtse	10,806	Druk Phuensum Tshogpa	963		Kamal Dan Chamling	2,557	
Phentshogpelri-Samtse	10,806	People's Democratic Party	2,463				
Phentshogpelri-Samtse	10,806	Bhutan Kuen-Nyam Party	1,054				
Radhi-Sagteng	9,874	Druk Nyamrup Tshogpa	2,117		Dorji Tshering	3,550	
Radhi-Sagteng	9,874	Druk Phuensum Tshogpa	2,392		Tashi Dorji	3,317	
Radhi-Sagteng	9,874	People's Democratic Party	1,320				
Radhi-Sagteng	9,874	Bhutan Kuen-Nyam Party	729				
Sangbaykha	3,645	Druk Nyamrup Tshogpa	312		Dorjee Wangmo	1,536	
Sangbaykha	3,645	Druk Phuensum Tshogpa	315		Tshewang Rinzin	857	
Sangbaykha	3,645	People's Democratic Party	1,690				
Sangbaykha	3,645	Bhutan Kuen-Nyam Party	103				
Sergithang-Tsirangtoed	11,545	Druk Nyamrup Tshogpa	2,706		Garja Man Rai	6,077	
Sergithang-Tsirangtoed	11,545	Druk Phuensum Tshogpa	1,416		Kewal Ram Adhikari	2,945	
Sergithang-Tsirangtoed	11,545	People's Democratic Party	2,409				
Sergithang-Tsirangtoed	11,545	Bhutan Kuen-Nyam Party	613				
Shompangkha	12,941	Druk Nyamrup Tshogpa	3,271		Tek Bahadur Rai	7,018	
Shompangkha	12,941	Druk Phuensum Tshogpa	1,342		Deo Kumar Rimal	2,862	
Shompangkha	12,941	People's Democratic Party	2,519				
Shompangkha	12,941	Bhutan Kuen-Nyam Party	983				
South Thiumphu-Thromde-Chang-Darkarkla-Genyen-Maedwang	7,802	Druk Nyamrup Tshogpa	1,211		Lotay Tshering	3,662	
South Thiumphu-Thromde-Chang-Darkarkla-Genyen-Maedwang	7,802	Druk Phuensum Tshogpa	1,134		Kinley Tshering	1,978	
South Thiumphu-Thromde-Chang-Darkarkla-Genyen-Maedwang	7,802	People's Democratic Party	1,333				
South Thiumphu-Thromde-Chang-Darkarkla-Genyen-Maedwang	7,802	Bhutan Kuen-Nyam Party	540				
Tashichhoeling	12,966	Druk Nyamrup Tshogpa	3,177		Dil Maya Rai	6,032	
Tashichhoeling	12,966	Druk Phuensum Tshogpa	1,155		Durga Prasad Chhetri	3,449	
Tashichhoeling	12,966	People's Democratic Party	2,610				
Tashichhoeling	12,966	Bhutan Kuen-Nyam Party	1,145				
Thrimshing	7,019	Druk Nyamrup Tshogpa	1,431		Ugyen Dorji	2,646	
Thrimshing	7,019	Druk Phuensum Tshogpa	1,712		Chenga Tshering	2,459	
Thrimshing	7,019	People's Democratic Party	1,523				
Thrimshing	7,019	Bhutan Kuen-Nyam Party	277				
Ugyentse-Yoeseltse	10,357	Druk Nyamrup Tshogpa	2,375		Dinesh Kumar Pradhan	5,353	
Ugyentse-Yoeseltse	10,357	Druk Phuensum Tshogpa	896		Lila Pradhan	2,054	
Ugyentse-Yoeseltse	10,357	People's Democratic Party	2,208				
Ugyentse-Yoeseltse	10,357	Bhutan Kuen-Nyam Party	739				
Wamrong	8,294	Druk Phuensum Tshogpa	2,083		Karma Thinley	2,980	
Wamrong	8,294	Druk Nyamrup Tshogpa	1,625		Jigme Wangdi	2,622	
Wamrong	8,294	People's Democratic Party	1,130				
Wamrong	8,294	Bhutan Kuen-Nyam Party	502				
