= Druk Phuensum Tshogpa =

Major political party in Bhutan

Druk Phuensum Tshogpa འབྲུག་ཕུན་སུམ་ཚོགས་པ།
- Abbreviation: DPT
- Leader: Dorji Wangdi
- Founded: 25 July 2007 (18 years ago)
- Merger of: All People's Party; Bhutan People's United Party
- Headquarters: Chang Lam, Thimphu
- Ideology: Royalism; Conservatism
- Political position: Centre-right
- Colors: Brown
- Seats in the National Assembly: 0 / 47

Election symbol
- Three Black-necked crane soaring high into the sky

Druk Phuensum Tshogpa (Dzongkha: འབྲུག་ཕུན་སུམ་ཚོགས་པ།; Wylie: 'brug phun-sum tshog-pa; translation: Bhutan Peace and Prosperity Party; abbr. DPT) is one of the major political parties in Bhutan. It was formed on 25 July 2007 as a merger of the All People's Party and the Bhutan People's United Party, which were both short-lived. The working committee of the merged entity, headed by the former home minister, Jigmi Yoezer Thinley, decided on the name for the new party. On 15 August 2007, Jigmi Yoezer Thinley was elected president of the party, and the party applied for registration, thus becoming the second political party in Bhutan to do so. On 2 October 2007, the Election Commission of Bhutan registered the party. On 24 March 2008, the party won the first general election held in Bhutan. The party secured 45 of the 47 seats to the National Assembly. The party tends to be more popular in the east of the country.

== 2013 election ==
In the 2013 general election, while the DPT secured 15 seats, it lost the position of ruling party. In this election, People's Democratic Party won 32 seats and became the ruling party. In July 2013 Jigme Thinley submitted the resignation for the Member of National Assembly before beginning its Legislative Session. So on 24 July of the same year Pema Gyamtsho, who is a former Minister of Agriculture and Forest, was appointed the Opposition Leader in NA for the Second Legislative Session. On 3 December same year he was also elected as the new DPT's Party President.

== Election results ==
=== National Assembly ===
Election	First round		Second round		Seats	+/–	Outcome
Election	Votes	%	Votes	%	Seats	+/–	Outcome
2008	169,490	67.04%	Cancelled		45 / 47	New	Supermajority
2013	93,949	44.52%	114,093	45.12%	15 / 47	▼30	Opposition
2018	90,020	30.92%	141,205	45.05%	17 / 47	▲2	Opposition
2023–24	46,694	14.91%	Did not qualify		0 / 47	▼17	Extra-parliamentary

== See also ==
- List of political parties in Bhutan
- Bhutanese election 2018
