= National Assembly (Bhutan) =

Lower house of the Parliament of Bhutan

Coordinates: 27°29′23.2″N 89°38′17.5″E

National Assembly རྒྱལ་ཡོངས་ཚོགས་འདུ་ Gyelyong Tshogdu
- 4th Legislature
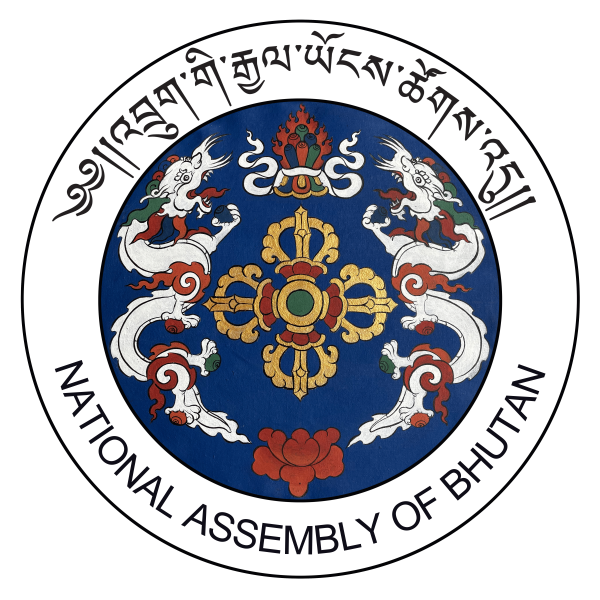

Type
- Type: Lower house of the Parliament of Bhutan

Leadership
- Speaker: Tempa Dorji, BTP since 19 August 2026
- Deputy Speaker: Sangay Khandu, PDP since 25 January 2024
- Leader of the House: Tshering Tobgay; Prime Minister of Bhutan, PDP since 28 January 2024
- Leader of the Opposition: Pema Chewang, BTP since 3 February 2024

Structure
- Seats: 47
- Political groups: Government (31): PDP (31); Opposition (16): BTP (16)
- Length of term: 5 years

Elections
- Voting system: Modified two-round system
- First election: 24 March 2008
- Last election: 30 November 2023 and 9 January 2024

Meeting place
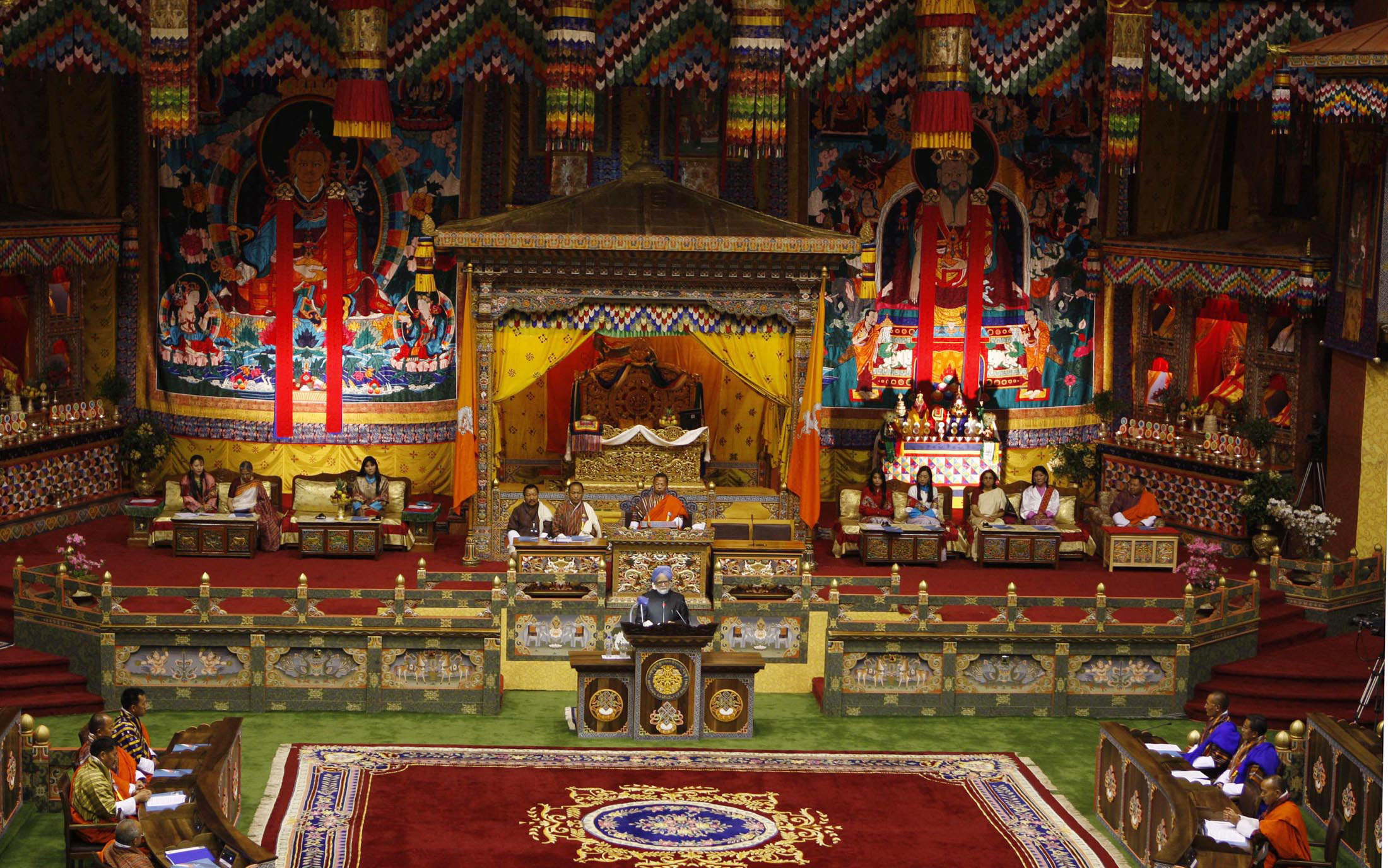
- Gyelyong Tshokhang, Thimphu (Here shown, Prime Minister Manmohan Singh of India addressing a joint session of the Parliament in 2008.)

Website
- www.nab.gov.bt

Constitution
- Constitution of Bhutan

The National Assembly is one of the two houses of the bicameral Parliament of Bhutan, and is responsible for enacting laws, representing the people, and overseeing the government. It consists of 47 members elected from 47 constituencies across the country.

Under the 2008 Constitution, Article 12, section 1, the National Assembly consists of a maximum of 55 members directly elected by the citizens of constituencies within each Dzongkhag (District). Under this single-winner voting system, each constituency is represented by a single National Assembly member; each of the 20 Dzongkhags must be represented by between 2–7 members. Constituencies are reapportioned every 10 years (Art. 12, § 2). The National Assembly meets at least twice a year (Art. 12, § 5), and elects a Speaker and Deputy Speaker from among its members (Art. 12, § 3). Members and candidates are allowed to hold political party affiliation.

The 2013 National Assembly election resulted in large increase in percentage of PDP members, who held 32 seats to the DPT's 15 when the new assembly was convened.

In the 2018 National Assembly election, PDP did not qualify for the elections. DNT saw a rise of 30 seats, thus becoming the majority party in the Assembly. DPT, which won 17 seats, became the opposition.

In the 2023–24 Bhutanese National Assembly election, both incumbent parliamentary parties failed to win seats. PDP returned as the majority party, while the new BTP became the opposition.

== History ==
The National Assembly was originally decreed in 1953 by King Jigme Dorji Wangchuck. The National Assembly began as a unicameral parliament within the King's framework for democratization. In 1971, King Jigme Dorji empowered the National Assembly to remove him or any of his successors with a two-thirds majority. The procedure for abdication remains a part of Bhutan's Constitution of 2008, with the addition of a three-fourths majority in a joint sitting of Parliament (i.e., including the National Council) to confirm the involuntary abdication as well as a national referendum to finalize it. (Art. 2)

On 15 August 2026, Lungten Dorji resigned as speaker in the middle of his term. On the same day Dorji would call a party meeting, Tshering Tobgay wasn't present but outlined for Health Minister Tandin Wangchuk to be nominated, who expressed no interest but accepted the nomination. MP Sonam Dorji supported by MP Kamal Bahadur Gurung would suggest nomiating Deputy Speaker Sangay Khandu, but he would decline it for the time. On 16 August, Tshering Tobgay and all 31 PDP MPs met to elect the candidate through a secret ballot, Sangay Khandu would decline the nomination. An unanimous show of hands would be done to nominate Tandin Wangchuk. Tobgay would ask all PDP members MPs vote for the nominee in the assembly. The party publicly announced the nomination on 17 August. On 18 August, MP Tempa Dorji from Maenbi-Tsaenkhar would be nominated for speaker by the BTP in a party meeting. On 19 August, the speaker election would be held using the secret ballot. The results had the first opposition member elected Speaker of the National Assembly in Bhutan's parliamentary history with BTP's Tempa Dorji receiving 24 to PDP's Tandin Wangchuk receiving 23 votes. 8 members of the PDP crossed the party line to vote with the BTP.

== Electoral system ==
The 47 members of the National Assembly are elected from single-member constituencies. Primary elections are held in which voters cast votes for parties. The top two parties are then able to field candidates in the main round of voting, in which members are elected using first-past-the-post voting.

== Speakers ==
Complete list of speakers of the National Assembly.

Name	Entered office	Left office
Dasho Kesang Dawa	1953	1955
Dasho Thinley Dorji	1956	1963
Dasho Tamji Jagar	1964	1965
Nidup Yanglop	1966	1968
Dasho Kesang Dawa	1969	1971
Dasho Shingkhar Lam	1971	1974
Nidup Yanglop	1974	1977
Dasho Tamji Jagar	1977	1988
Lyonpo Sangye Penjor	1988	1989
Dasho Passang Dorji	1989	1997
Lyonpo Kinzang Dorji	1997	2000
Dasho Ugyen Dorji	2000	2007
Lyonpo Jigme Tshultim	2008	2013
Lyonpo Jigme Zangpo	2013	2018
Lyonpo Wangchuk Namgyel	2018	2024
Lungten Dorji	2024	2026
Tempa Dorji	2026	Present

== Constituencies ==
A map of Bhutan showing its 20 dzongkhags. Currently, each dzongkhag has between two and five National Assembly constituencies.

The National Assembly, the lower of the Parliament of Bhutan, consists Members of Parliament (MPs). Each MP represents a single geographic constituency. Currently, there are 47 National Assembly constituencies. Out of the 20 dzongkhags of Bhutan, Trashigang, with five constituencies, has the highest number of National Assembly constituencies. Samtse, with four constituencies, has the second highest number of National Assembly constituencies. Mongar and Pema Gatshel, with three constituencies each, share the third-highest position. All of the other 16 dzongkhags have two constituencies each.

== See also ==
- Politics of Bhutan
- List of political parties in Bhutan
- Elections in Bhutan
  - 2008 Bhutanese National Assembly election
  - 2013 Bhutanese National Assembly election
  - 2018 Bhutanese National Assembly election
- Parliament of Bhutan
  - National Council of Bhutan
- Bhutanese legislation
  - Constitution of Bhutan
- List of constituencies of the Bhutan National Assembly
