= Democracy in Bhutan =

The development of democracy in Bhutan has been marked by the active encouragement and participation of reigning Bhutanese monarchs since the 1950s, beginning with legal reforms such as the abolition of slavery, and culminating in the enactment of Bhutan's Constitution. The first democratic elections in Bhutan began in 2007, and all levels of government had been democratically elected by 2011. These elections included Bhutan's first ever partisan National Assembly election. Democratization in Bhutan has been marred somewhat by the intervening large-scale expulsion and flight of Bhutanese refugees during the 1990s; the subject remains somewhat taboo in Bhutanese politics. Bhutan was ranked 13th most electoral democratic country in Asia according to V-Dem Democracy indices in 2023 with a score of 0.535 out of 1.

== Role of the monarchy ==
=== History ===
The process of modernization and democratization was initiated by the Third King of Bhutan Jigme Dorji Wangchuck (r. October 27, 1952 – July 21, 1972) amid increasing internal and external political complexity. Three years prior, in 1949, India and Bhutan had signed the Treaty of Peace and Friendship, which provided that India would not interfere in Bhutan's internal affairs but that Bhutan would be guided by India in its foreign policy. This is the first international agreement that unambiguously recognizes Bhutan's independence and sovereignty. Early groundwork for democratization began in 1952, when then king Jigme Dorji Wangchuck established the country's legislature – a 130-member National Assembly – to promote a more democratic form of governance. Among the Third King's most basic democratic reforms was the abolition of slavery in Bhutan in 1958. Under the reign of H.M Jigme Dorji Wangchuck, Bhutan further endeavored simultaneously to foster foreign ties and to develop its own infrastructure under five year plans.

The Fourth King of Bhutan Jigme Singye Wangchuck (r. July 24, 1972 - December 14, 2006) planned and oversaw many of the political and legal reforms that have shaped the constitutional monarchy and democracy in Bhutan. On one hand, these included procedures to force royal abdication and a draft democratic constitution ultimately ratified after his own abdication. On the other hand, H.M Jigme Singye Wangchuck's reign saw the enactment of restrictive citizenship laws, increased emphasis on culturally assimilatory driglam namzha laws, and the expulsion and flight of thousands of Lhotshampa (ethnic Nepalese) refugees from Bhutan in the 1990s. Since the abdication of the Fourth King, the head of state has retained the regal title, but no longer reigns with absolute power.

The reign of the Fifth and current King of Bhutan H.M Jigme Khesar Namgyel Wangchuck has seen the enactment of the Constitution of 2008, as well as the democratic elections of both houses of Parliament and three levels of local government (dzongkhag, gewog, and thromde).

Since the establishment of the House of Wangchuck as the ruling royal family of Bhutan, the intimately connected Dorji family has played an integral role in opening Bhutan to the outside world and promoting political reforms. Kazi Dorji (d. 1916) had advised the future First King to mediate between the British and Tibet, and it was Kazi Dorji who was later responsible for the large-scale induction of Nepalis into Bhutan. Under the monarchy, the family accrued massive wealth and its members filled multiple high government posts including Chief Minister (Gongzim) and its successor post Prime Minister (Lyonchen). The sister of Prime Minister Jigme Dorji – the daughter of Topgay Raja – married the Third King of Bhutan, creating a new bond so prominent as to cause some discontent among other Bhutanese families; the public has been divided politically between pro-modernist and pro-monarchist camps.

== Elections ==
Elections, the cornerstone of participatory democracy, began in Bhutan with a mock election on April 21, 2007, to allow the population to become accustomed to the democratic process. Bhutan's actual first non-partisan democratic election commenced on December 31, 2007. These were followed by actual elections to choose Bhutan's first democratic government in the form of a bicameral parliament. First, citizens elected members of the non-partisan National Council (upper house) between 2007 and 2008; the more powerful partisan National Assembly (lower house), from which the executive is nominated, was elected later in 2008. This government enacted the kingdom's first ever constitution. Bhutan's first democratic local elections were originally slated for 2008, but were delayed until 2011. Local elections for dzongkhag, gewog, and thromde governments were conducted on a staggered schedule between January and August 2011. Voter participation was markedly lower than in previous elections, owing variously to delays, disillusionment, and complications in voting procedure.

=== Mock election ===
On April 21, 2007, Bhutan began practising democracy. They held a mock election to begin to acclimate the populace to the democratic process. There were four parties on the ballot: Druk Blue, Druk Green, Druk Red and Druk Yellow. (Druk is the Dzongkha word for the thunder dragon, the country's national symbol.) Although the parties were fictional, there were thematic party platform descriptions for each one.

Runoff elections were held on May 28, 2007, between Druk Yellow and Druk Red. The two leading parties put up randomly chosen high school students as candidates in the 47 constituencies in the second round in an effort to produce a two-party system to avoid the need for coalition governments and possible political instability. The Druk Yellow Party swept the vote and won 46 of the 47 constituencies. Turnout in the second round was 66%.

Mock election results
| Party | Platform | Votes | Percent | Runoff election |
|---|---|---|---|---|
| Druk Blue | to fight corruption and extend free health care and education | < 25,424 | <20.39 | n/a |
| Druk Green | environment-friendly development | >18,637 | >14.93 | n/a |
| Druk Red | to promote industrialization | 25,423 | 20.38 | ? |
| Druk Yellow | preservation and promotion of our rich cultural heritage and tradition | 55,263 | 44.30 | ? |

=== First National Council election, 2007–2008 ===
On December 31, 2007, Bhutan democratically elected its first National Council, the upper house of the new bicameral Parliament of Bhutan. The National Council of Bhutan consisted of 25 members, out of which 20 members were directly elected from 20 dzongkhags by 312,817 eligible voters, and five more nominated by the King of Bhutan. Nominations had to be filed by November 27, 2007, and the campaigning for 15 of the 20 dzongkhags took place from November 30, 2007, until December 31, 2007.

Elections were not held in five dzongkhags (Thimphu, Trashiyangtse, Gasa, Haa and Lhuntse) on December 31, 2007, since they either did not have any candidate or had only a single candidate until the last date for filing the nominations. The election rules state that there should be at least two candidates for each dzongkhag, otherwise the election would be postponed for that particular dzongkhag. The elections in these five dzongkhags were held on January 29, 2008.

=== First National Assembly election, 2008 ===
Bhutan held its first general election on March 24, 2008 for the National Assembly. Two parties were registered by the Election Commission of Bhutan to contest the election: the Bhutan Peace and Prosperity Party (DPT, for Druk Phuensum Tshogpa), which was formed by the merger of the previously established Bhutan People's United Party and All People's Party and is led by Jigme Y. Thinley, and the People's Democratic Party (PDP). The third political party, the Bhutan National Party (BNP), had its application for the registration canceled.

| Party | Votes | % | Seats |
|---|---|---|---|
| Druk Phuensum Tshogpa | 169,490 | 67.04 | 45 |
| People's Democratic Party | 83,322 | 32.96 | 2 |
| Total | 252,812 | 100.00 | 47 |
| Total votes | 252,812 | – | |
| Registered voters/turnout | 318,465 | 79.38 | |
Source: Election Commission of Bhutan, EUEOM

Turnout reached nearly 80% by the time the polls closed, and the Bhutan Peace and Prosperity Party reportedly won 44 seats, with the People's Democratic Party winning only three seats (Phuentsholing in Chukha, Goenkhatoe-Laya in Gasa and Sombeykha in Haa). The PDP's leader, Sangay Ngedup, who is also the ruling king's uncle, lost his own constituency by 380 votes. Reportedly, there were few differences between the platforms of the two parties, which might explain the unexpectedly uneven results; analysts are worried that the small representation of the opposition may obstruct the functioning of the newly founded democratic system. Both parties had pledged to follow the king's guidelines of "pursuing Gross National Happiness", and both party leaders had previously served in governments.

Another attempt to explain the BPPP's large-scale victory is that it is apparently the more pro-monarchy of the two parties. An explanation popularly given by Bhutanese in the days leading up to the election for the lack of support for the People's Democratic Party was that it would encourage corruption and be contrary to the King's request for the Bhutanese to form a popular government to elect leadership having (as was popularly believed about the PDP) strong personal ties to both the King and Bhutanese business.

The DPT officially approved its leader Jigme Thinley as candidate for Prime Minister on 5 April 2008. He took office on 9 April.

=== Enactment of the Constitution ===
The Constitution was enacted July 18, 2008 by the first democratically elected government. It was thoroughly planned by several government officers and agencies over a period of almost seven years amid increasing democratic reforms in Bhutan. The Constitution is based on Buddhist philosophy, international Conventions on Human Rights, comparative analysis of 20 other modern constitutions, public opinion, and existing laws, authorities, and precedents. According to Princess Sonam Wangchuck, the constitutional committee was particularly influenced by the Constitution of South Africa because of its strong protection of human rights.

On 4 September 2001, King Jigme Singye Wangchuck had briefed the Lhengye Zhungtshog (Council of Ministers, or Cabinet), the Chief Justice, and the Chairman of the Royal Advisory Council on the need to draft a formal Constitution for the Kingdom of Bhutan. While Bhutan did not have a formal Constitution, the King believed all the principles and provisions of a Constitution were covered under the various written laws and legislation which guided the actions of the King and the functioning of the Royal Government, the judiciary, and the National Assembly of Bhutan. Nevertheless, the King felt the time had come for a formal Constitution for the Kingdom of Bhutan. The King expressed his desire that the Lhengye Zhungtshog and the Chief Justice should hold discussions on formulating the Draft Constitution, and ordered the formation of the Drafting Committee from among government officials, National Assembly members, and eminent citizens who were well qualified, had a good understanding of the laws of Bhutan. The King emphasized that the Constitution must ensure that Bhutan had a political system that would provide peace and stability, and also strengthen and safeguard Bhutan's security and sovereignty. On November 30, 2001, the King inaugurated the outset of its drafting with a ceremony. By 2005, the Royal Government had circulated copies of the draft among the civil service and local governments in order to receive locals' feedback.

=== First local government elections, 2011 ===
Elections began on January 20, 2011, however polls opened in only 3 of 20 districts – Thimphu, Chukha District (Phuentsholing), and Samdrup Jongkhar – as part of a staggered election schedule. Polls closed June 27, 2011. Ahead of elections, 1,042 chiwogs, the basis of Bhutan's single-constituency electoral scheme, were slated to elect the leadership of Dzongkhag, Gewog, and Thromde governments. Candidates for local elections in Bhutan must not belong to any political party, must not be registered clergy, and must meet the residency, character, and other requirements of Bhutanese election laws. Campaigns for local elections were not publicly funded, and candidates were limited to a campaign budget of Nu.50,000 (about USD 1,130). During this election cycle, Bhutan implemented a forum-style campaigns for the first time, reportedly with success. Previously, candidates campaigned at gatherings that each called individually.

On June 28, 2011, the Election Commission announced the preliminary results of the local government elections. It reported a voter turnout of 56%, electing 1,104 representatives at various levels from among 2,185 candidates. The initial report disclosed "a few" cases of mismatched voter rolls and voter identification cards, and stated that in 135 of these cases, the problems were rectified. It also mentioned that some votes had been improperly cast in voters' former domiciles and were rejected. The report further described 4 candidate disqualifications under the election laws, as well as a total of 16 election disputes, of which 3 were appealed to the Election Commission. Overall, elections were reported to have gone smoothly, and several international observers were allowed access.

According to Bhutanese media, local elections were particularly marked by voter apathy and distrust, leading to lackluster campaign gatherings and poor turnout during elections.

Several problems resulted in cancellations and delays of results in local elections. Notably, a lack of candidates contesting seats resulted in a total of 373 vacancies remained after local government elections. These vacancies included 3 for gup, 1 for mangmi, 360 for gewog tshogpa, 8 for dzongkhag thromde thuemi, and 1 for thromde tshogpa. As a further complication, gup polls in Goenshari Gewog (Punakha) and tshogpa polls in Sherabling Chiwog of Chhudzom Gewog (Sarpang) resulted in equal votes among rival candidates. The Election Commission also disclosed on July 8, 2011, that it had discovered seven elected candidates were in fact ineligible because they did not meet the age requirement (between 25 and 65). As a result, the Commission quashed the elections for gup of Bjacho Gewog (Chhukha), for tshogpa of Nyechhu Shar-ri Chiwog in Tsento Gewog (Paro), Gyalgong Chiwog in Silambi Gewog (Mongar), Langchhenphug Chiwog in Langchenphu Gewog (Samdrup Jongkhar), Ramtogtog_Tsangrina Chiwog in Chang Gewog (Thimphu), Lemphang Chiwog in Bidung Gewog (Trashigang), and Chaling Chiwog in Shongphu Gewog (Trashigang).

During election re-runs, the democratic process again performed: despite the discouraging disqualifications, long journeys to polling stations, and decreased voter turnout in Goenshari from 382 to 323, the rerun proved hotly contested and was won by Kinley Dorji by a narrow 16 votes.

== Politics and culture ==
Bhutan is an orderly place. Everyone follows the traffic rules and even the country's driglam namzha code is strictly adhered to. As with many Asian cultures, Bhutan has historically valued harmony above liberty. This is probably why the transition to democracy has been orderly and peaceful, however, it is also why the people are generally uneasy about the future and the changes.

One source of the discomfort is the cognitive dissonance induced by the inherent contradiction of a king ordering democracy: follow the king's order because he knows what is best for the people; move toward democracy because the people are best suited to rule themselves. The King's position is that this uneasiness is precisely why it is the perfect time for such changes.

Another source of apprehension stems from the country's history of isolation. Television was not introduced until 1999, and the people have been unaccustomed to voicing their opinions or listening to others voice theirs. This is one of the reasons the government has gone to such lengths as mock elections to train the people and insure an orderly transition.

== Influence of ethnic Nepalese ==
Expatriate Nepalese, who resettled in West Bengal and Assam after leaving Bhutan, formed the Bhutan State Congress in 1952 to represent the interests of other expatriates in India as well as the communities they had left behind.

As noted by the human rights agency Freedom House, "In 1989, a royal kasho (decree) reintroduced the code of traditional dress known as driglam namzha and the requirement to wear the traditional gho and kira when visiting government offices and monasteries, while also emphasizing the use of Dzongkha as the national language." Although it is sometimes claimed that the government also banned the use of the Nepali language, this has never been true, and Bhutanese government broadcasts are made to this day in Nepali, known in Bhutan as Lhotsamkha. In addition to forcing people to speak Dzonghka in public places, the government began to increasingly encroach upon the way of life by enforcing driglam namzha for all people, requiring them to dress in Ngalop robes and follow Drukpa Buddhist practices from attending the temple to their manner of serving tea. One tactic employed by the government was to use the lack of land titling as a means to evict Lhotshampa (ethnic Nepali) residents; this and other tactics left Lhotshampa in Bhutan extremely vulnerable. In addition, government agents began to force the ethnic Nepali to leave the country and orchestrated videotaped "affirmations" that individuals were leaving of their own will rather than due to government force. This, along with other limits on the Nepali people, resulted in an estimated 100,000 ethnic Nepalese who fled to refugee camps across the border in Nepal. However, the UNHCR-recognized refugees are not accepted by Bhutan as citizens of Bhutan; they do not have Bhutanese citizenship because jus soli has never operated in Bhutan. Therefore, they do not have grounds to claim citizenship even if they were born there.

The loosely organized Bhutanese pro-democracy movement in the United States is located in Austin, Texas. The group claims that its website has been the victim of multiple cyber-attacks and blocks.

The king's call for elections and abdication of power did an end-run around the exiled movement, preempting any existing calls for freedom from outside (or inside) the country. The irony is that the exiled movement will most likely not have any direct participation in the birth of the new democracy which it had been calling for. Although, the refugee issue remains unresolved and will likely need to be addressed by the new government at some point.

== Timeline ==
- 1907 - Wangchuck Dynasty established under British suzerainty
- 1947 - India assumes responsibility for Bhutan's foreign affairs
- 1947-1950 - Influx of Lhotshampa (ethnic Nepalese) from India
- 1952 - Country's first legislature established – a 130-member National Assembly
- 1952 - Lhotshampa expatriates form the Bhutan State Congress in India and elsewhere
- 1958 - King Jigme Dorji Wangchuck abolishes feudalism and slavery
- 1958 - First Citizenship Act enacted
- 1963 - Royal Advisory Council created
- 1967 - High court is created and judicial system reorganized
- 1972 - King Jigme Singye Wangchuck assumes power and introduces the concept of Gross National Happiness
- 1985 - Second Citizenship Act enacted
- 1989 - Driglam namzha is made mandatory; Dzongkha enforced as official language, and the use of other languages on government properties banned.
- 2005 - King Jigme Singye Wangchuck announces his intent to abdicate
- 2007 - Mock election conducted
- 2008 - First National Council and National Assembly elections; first modern Constitution ratified

== See also ==
- Constitution of Bhutan
- Elections in Bhutan
  - List of political parties in Bhutan
- Freedom of religion in Bhutan
- Immigration in Bhutan
- Politics of Bhutan
