= All People's Party (Bhutan) =

- Leader: Jigme Thinley
- Dissolved: July 25 2007
- Succeeded by: Bhutan Peace and Prosperity Party

The All People's Party (APP) was a political party in Bhutan. Its leader was former Prime Minister Jigme Y. Thinley.

On July 25, 2007, the relatively strong APP merged with the failing Bhutan People's Unity Party, led by former lyonpo (assemblyman) Yeshey Zimba; the two parties unified as the Bhutan Peace and Prosperity Party. Both the PUP and APP had been registered with the Election Commission.

== See also ==
- List of political parties in Bhutan
- 2008 Bhutanese general election
