= Bhutan People's Unity Party =

- Leader: Yeshey Zimba; Sigay Dorji (breakaway)
- Chairman: Sigay Dorji
- Founded: 2006; September 2007 (breakaway)
- Dissolved: 25 July 2007; November 2007
- Split from: Bhutan Peace and Prosperity Party
- Merged into: Bhutan Peace and Prosperity Party
- Headquarters: Thimphu
- Ideology: Conservatism

The Bhutan People's Unity Party, also called Druk People's Unity Party (PUP), was a Bhutanese political party. It was founded by regional and national cadres (chimi and Royal Advisory Councilors) serving in Bhutan's pre-democratic government. Led by former minister (assemblyman) Yeshey Zimba, BPUP then merged with the stronger All People's Party (APP), headed by former and future prime minister Jigme Y. Thinley; the two parties unified as the Druk Phuensum Tshogpa on 25 July 2007. Both the BPUP and APP had been registered with the Election Commission.

The BPUP was briefly revived as a breakaway faction from September to November 2007 under the leadership of Sigay Dorji since its looking for well advanced party candidates in term of age and qualified enough to serve the three jewel like they did in their term. In November 2007, the Election Commission rejected the BPUP's registration, preventing its candidates from participating in Bhutan's first partisan election. Amid allegations that over 75% of the BPUP's membership consisted of school dropouts, the Election Commission found the party lacked "credible leadership of the calibre that is needed to run and manage the affairs of the nation or even the management of the group itself," and that it lacked "the capacity to fulfill ... national aspirations, visions, and goals." The elimination of the BPUP reduced the anticipated two-stage electoral process into a single-election contest. The BPUP again merged with the Bhutan Peace and Prosperity Party after the Election Commission prevented it from registering under the new constitutional framework.

== See also ==
- Elections in Bhutan
- List of political parties in Bhutan
