= Sangay Ngedup =

3rd Prime Minister of Bhutan

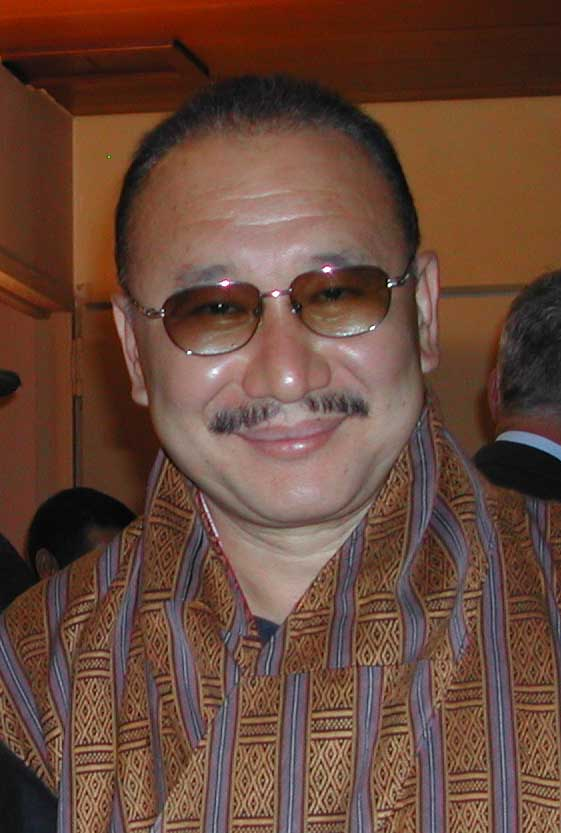
- Sangay Ngedup in 2005

3rd Prime Minister of Bhutan
- In office 5 September 2005 – 7 September 2006
- Monarch: Jigme Singye
- Preceded by: Yeshey Zimba
- Succeeded by: Khandu Wangchuk
- In office 9 July 1999 – 20 July 2000
- Monarch: Jigme Singye
- Preceded by: Jigme Thinley
- Succeeded by: Yeshey Zimba

Personal details
- Born: 1 July 1953 (age 72) Nobgang, Punakha, Bhutan
- Party: People's Democratic Party
- Parent(s): Yab Dasho Ugyen Dorji; Yum Thuiji Zam

Lyonpo Sangay Ngedup (Dzongkha: སངས་རྒྱས་དངོས་གྲུབ, Wylie: sangs-rgyas dngos-grub, born 1 July 1953) was Prime Minister of Bhutan from 1999 to 2000 and again from 2005 to 2006.

== Biography ==
Sangay Ngedup was born in Nobgang village in Punakha. He is the second child and eldest son in a family of three brothers and six sisters. Four of his sisters are married to the former King of Bhutan, Jigme Singye Wangchuck.

His father, Yab Dasho Ugyen Dorji (1925–2019), was the founder and proprietor of Ugyen Academy (UA) (03/04/2002). His mother is Yum Thuiji Zam (b. 1932). Yum Thuiji Zam Charity School in Thimphu District is named after her.

His two brothers are:

- Dasho Ugyen Tsechup (b. 1964).
- Dasho Topgay (b. 1966).

His six sisters are:

- Ashi Beda (b. 1951).
- HM Ashi Dorji Wangmo (b. 1955).
- HM Ashi Tshering Pem (b. 1957).
- HM Ashi Tshering Yangdon (b. 1959), mother of King Jigme Khesar Namgyel Wangchuck.
- HM Ashi Sangay Choden (b 1963).
- Ashi Sonam Choden (b. 1969).

He graduated from Dr. Graham's Homes in Kalimpong, India, and completed his tertiary education at St. Stephen's College in Delhi, India. In 1976, he joined the Bhutanese foreign service, and attended diplomatic courses in Australia and New Delhi.

In 1977, Lyonpo Sangay Ngedup served at the permanent mission of Bhutan to the United Nations in New York and later as second (and later first) secretary in the Royal Bhutan Embassy in New Delhi. In 1989, Lyonpo Sangay Ngedup was appointed as Ambassador to Kuwait.

He was transferred as the Director of Trade and Industry in 1989 and then as the joint secretary of the Planning Commission in April 1991. He became the Director General of Health in 1992. In 1998 he became Minister of Health and Education, and he served as Prime Minister from July 9, 1999, until July 20, 2000. He was Minister of Agriculture from 2003 to 2007, and on September 5, 2005, was appointed as Prime Minister again, serving until September 7, 2006. In July 2007 he resigned from the government, together with Prime Minister Lyonpo Khandu Wangchuk and five other ministers, to enter politics and prepare for the country's first ever democratic election in 2008. Lyonpo Sangay Ngedup, whose demonstrated leadership style is democratic, was unanimously elected as president and leader of the newly constituted People's Democratic Party.

In his presidential debate, the first ever held in February 2008, Lyonpo Sangay Ngedup promised that, if he won the election, he would base his policies of governing on Gross National Happiness (GNH), a philosophy (coined by the fourth king Jigme Singye Wangchuck, his brother-in-law) that states that happiness is more important than material growth for the people.

He led his party during the election, held on March 24, 2008, but lost in his own constituency; the People's Democratic Party took only two seats of a possible 47 in the National Assembly.

Lyonpo Sangay Ngedup was awarded the Red Scarf by His Majesty the King on August 24, 1987, and the Orange Scarf on January 1, 1998.

In 2002 he undertook with six other members the Move for Health Walk from Trashigang to the capital city of Thimphu covering on foot a distance of 560 km concluded successfully as scheduled. The Walk was conceived by Lyonpo Sangay Ngedup to promote the fund-raising for the Bhutan Health Trust Fund, an important initiative to keep the primary health services of Bhutan free of charge.

On 8 September 2015, he received the World Health Organization’s excellence in public health award.

Lyonpo Sangay Ngedup is the Honorary President of the Bhutan Scouts Association.

== Ancestry ==
Ancestors of Sangay Ngedup

16. Nob Gyeltshen
8. Kuenga Gyeltshen
17. Phenkhem
4. Sangay Tenzin
9. Ngodrup Pem
2. Yab Dasho Ugyen Dorji
20. Soenam Drubyel, 4th Sersang Lama
10. Gyeltshen Dorji, 5th Sersang Lama
21. Sangay Droelma
5. Dorji Om
22. Yonten Phuntsho
11. Abi Yum Yangchen Droelma
1. Sangay Ngedup
6. Lopen Duba
3. Yum Thuiji Zam
7. Ugay Dem

Political offices
Preceded by Jigme Thinley	Prime Minister of Bhutan; 1999–2000	Succeeded by Yeshey Zimba
Preceded by Yeshey Zimba	Prime Minister of Bhutan; 2005–2006	Succeeded by Khandu Wangchuk
