= Kinga Tshering =

Bhutanese politician (born 1966)

Member of the National Assembly
- In office August 2013 – August 2016
- Preceded by: Ugen Tshering
- Succeeded by: Tshering
- Constituency: North Thimphu

Chief Executive Officer (CEO), DHI INFRA, Bhutan
- In office April 2010 – February 2013

Chief Executive Officer (CEO) of Bank of Bhutan
- In office December 2007 – April 2010
- Preceded by: Tshering Dorji
- Succeeded by: Passang Dorji

Personal details
- Born: December 20, 1966 (age 59) Thimphu, Bhutan
- Party: Druk Thuendrel Tshogpa (since 2022); Druk Phuensum Tshogpa (until 2016)
- Spouse: Tshering Wangmo
- Children: Kunzang PC Tshering, Yeshi Seldon Tshering and Gelek Yangzom Tshering
- Education: Harvard Kennedy School, Pepperdine University, Kansas University

Kinga Tshering (born 20 December 1966) is a Bhutanese businessman and politician. He served in the public sector for 23 years in Bhutan, most recently as a Member of Parliament in the National Assembly. He has experience in legislation, and organization building with the formation of Bhutan Power Corporation (BPC), Bhutan Electricity Authority (BEA) and Druk Holding and Investments (DHI). He also has experience in the financial sector, banking, energy and infrastructure projects in the capacity of a CEO and a board member.

He led corporate restructuring, change management, strategy, and social enterprises. He has stated as a goal making a profound impact and transformative change on the society through activism in democracy, innovation in governance, and integration of the HAPPINESS index into mainstream economic theory and development works in emerging nations.

He was a Fulbright Fellow while pursuing his BSc in engineering at the University of Kansas, and a Dispute Resolution Fellow at the Straus Institute of Dispute Resolution while pursuing his MBA at Pepperdine University. In 2017, he completed his Ford Foundation Mason Fellowship in the Mid Career Masters in Public Administration program at the Harvard Kennedy School. He spent 2018 as a fellow at the Harvard Kennedy School's Ash Center for Democratic Governance and Innovation.
