= Pema Chewang =

Bhutanese Politician

Dasho Pema Chewang

Leader of the Opposition of the National Assembly of Bhutan
- Incumbent
- Assumed office 3 February 2024
- Preceded by: Dorji Wangdi

President of Bhutan Tendrel Party
- Incumbent
- Assumed office November 2022
- Preceded by: Position established

Member of the National Assembly of Bhutan
- Incumbent
- Assumed office 25 January 2024
- Constituency: Kanglung-Samkhar-Udzorong

Personal details
- Born: 1967 or 1968 (age 58–59)
- Party: Bhutan Tendrel Party

Dasho Pema Chewang (born 1967/1968) is a Bhutanese civil servant and politician who is the leader and founder of the Bhutan Tendrel Party. He previously worked as the Secretary of the National Land Commission of Bhutan from 2014 until his entry into politics in 2022.

== Education and career ==
Chewang has a B.A. from Sherubtse College and a Master in Development Economics from the Australian National University. He served in various roles as a civil servant, including as Chief Planning Officer in the Gross National Happiness Commission and in 2014 was appointed as Secretary of the National Land Commission. In 2020 he was awarded the Red Scarf by king Jigme Khesar Namgyel Wangchuck, conferring on him the title of "Dasho".

== Politics ==
In November 2022, Chewang founded the Bhutan Tendrel Party and was unanimously elected as party president. BTP was registered as a political party by the Election Commission of Bhutan in January 2023, and put forth candidates for the National Assembly election later that year. Chewang ran as a candidate in the constituency of Kanglung-Samkhar-Udzorong, in the Trashigang District, where he placed first in the primary round, with 49.16% of the vote. He also won in the general round with 66.91% of the vote.
