= Bhutan Media Foundation =

Media organization in Bhutan

The Bhutan Media Foundation is a Civil Society Organisation (CSO) established under Royal Charter and with seed funding from His Majesty King Jigme Khesar Namgyel Wangchuck, in Thimphu on 21 February 2010.

The first executive director Lily Wangchuk, a former diplomat and author, described the CSO's broad aims: “For the first time in the country, we will be conducting trainings not only for reporters and editors but also for designers, marketing officers, photographers, circulation officers, administrative officers”. Wangchuck left the organisation in 2012, to pursue a role with Druk Chirwang Tshogpa, becoming the first woman in Bhutan to be appointed president of a political party. BMF is currently headed by Needrup Zangpo, former editor-in-chief of Bhutan Observer.

== Activities ==
As part of its role to build capacity in the media sector it runs training programs for journalists, focusing on such topics as climate change reporting; investigative journalism, and reporting gender. It also provides media literacy programs to citizens, such as 'Navigating infodemic, misinformation and disinformation: a Toolkit'. The BMF published two editions of Journalism Review Magazine providing critical analysis of the state of the media and journalism in Bhutan.

In September 2013, the BMF signed a memorandum of understanding with Sherubtse College detailing a collaboration with the college's media studies program. The agreement stated that the BMF will facilitate internships of media students and faculty with Bhutanese, Indian, and international media organizations, assist in establishing exchange programs, and support the campus radio and student newsletter. The college will offer scholarships in the media studies program to working media professionals, with candidates identified by the BMF, and host BMF lectures, workshops, and training programs.

In October 2013, together with Earth Journalism Network and Third Pole, the BMF launched a forum for environmental journalists, intended to aid local journalists improve environmental reporting through networking and training. Bhutan's constitution mandates the support of environment friendly practices and policies by the nation's government and citizens.

In 2017 the Swiss Agency for Development Corporation (SDC) and Gross National Happiness Commission provided Nu 1 million to BMF to develop two media apps. The Bhutan News app allowed subscribers to download the digital edition of each day’s newspaper and the Radiola app allowed people to listen on their phones to the three private FM radio stations.

The BMF further supported nine newspapers and three radio stations to develop and upgrade their online platforms.

== Social Media Landscape Report ==
In 2021 the BMF released a report detailing the use and impact of social media in the country. According to the report, about 90 per cent of Bhutanese citizens use at least one social media site for their main source of information. Facebook is the primary site for encountering disinformation on social media, with word of mouth coming a close second. More than 50 percent of respondents also experienced disinformation on social media networks like and via social media influencers. More than 90 % of respondents reported spending nearly 3 hours on social media every day, which exceeds the global average of over 2 hours.

== Thimphu Press Club ==
In October 2023, BMF launched Thimphu Press Club at an event attended by the Prime Minister Dr Lotay Tshering, members of Bhutan's Parliament, seven Members of Parliament from Germany, two Members of Parliament from Austria, members of the Friedrich Naumann Foundation, and the press.
