= Khandu Wangchuk =

5th Prime Minister of Bhutan

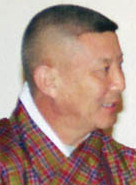
- Khandu Wangchuk on 7 June 2004

5th Prime Minister of Bhutan
- In office 7 September 2006 – 2 August 2007
- Monarchs: Jigme Singye Wangchuck; Jigme Khesar Namgyel Wangchuck
- Preceded by: Sangay Ngedup
- Succeeded by: Kinzang Dorji
- In office 8 August 2001 – 14 August 2002
- Monarch: Jigme Singye Wangchuck
- Preceded by: Yeshey Zimba
- Succeeded by: Kinzang Dorji

3rd Foreign Minister of Bhutan
- In office 2003–2007
- Prime Minister: See list: Jigme Thinley Yeshey Zimba Sangay Ngedup Himself
- Preceded by: Jigme Thinley
- Succeeded by: Yeshey Dorji (acting); Ugyen Tshering

Personal details
- Born: 24 November 1950 (age 75) Paro, Bhutan

Lyonpo Khandu Wangchuk (Dzongkha: མཁའ་འགྲོ་དབང་ཕྱུག, born 24 November 1950 in Paro) is a political figure in Bhutan. He graduated from St. Stephen's College, University of Delhi. He was Chairman of the council (Prime Minister) from 2001 until 2002. On 7 September 2006, he became Prime Minister again; he was then replaced by Kinzang Dorji on 2 August 2007, after Wangchuk resigned to participate in the 2008 election as a member of the Druk Phuensum Tshogpa (DPT) political party. He also served as Minister of Foreign Affairs from 2003 to 2007.

Following the DPT's victory in the March 2008 election, Wangchuk became Minister of Economic Affairs on April 11, 2008.

== Honours ==
- Bhutan :
  - The Royal Red Scarf (March 1987).
  - The Royal Orange Scarf (January 1994).

Political offices
Preceded by Yeshey Zimba	Prime Minister of Bhutan; 2001–2002	Succeeded by Kinzang Dorji
Preceded by Sangay Ngedup	Prime Minister of Bhutan; 2006–2007	Succeeded by Kinzang Dorji
