= 2023–24 Bhutanese National Assembly election =

- 30 November 2023 (first round); 9 January 2024 (second round)

All 47 seats in the National Assembly 24 seats needed for a majority
- Turnout: 65.60%
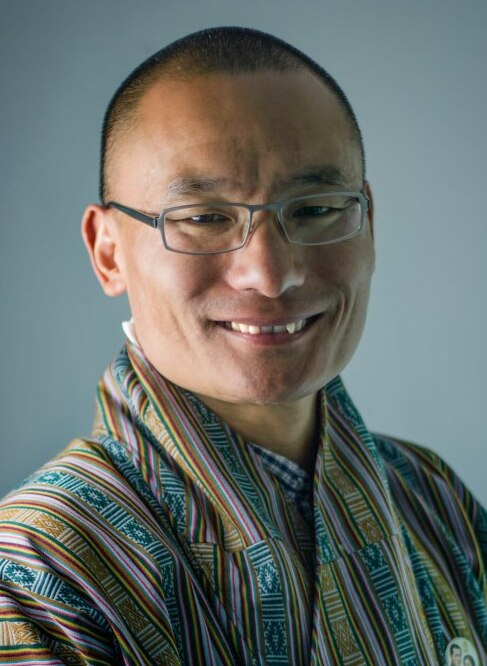
	First party	Second party
		BTP
Leader	Tshering Tobgay	Pema Chewang
Party	PDP	BTP
Last election	27.44%, 0 seats	–
Seats won	30	17
Seat change	▲30	New
Popular vote	179,652	147,123
Percentage	54.98%	45.02%
Prime Minister before election
Lotay Tshering
DNT
Elected Prime Minister
Tshering Tobgay
PDP

The 2023–24 Bhutanese National Assembly election was held in two rounds on 30 November 2023 and 9 January 2024 to elect the 47 members of the National Assembly, the lower house of the Parliament of Bhutan. It was the fourth National Assembly election held under Bhutan's 2008 Constitution. Four political parties contested the first round, with the People's Democratic Party (PDP) and the Bhutan Tendrel Party (BTP) qualifying for the second round after finishing first and second respectively. The ruling Druk Nyamrup Tshogpa (DNT), led by Prime Minister Lotay Tshering, finished third and failed to qualify for the second round, while the Bhutan Tendrel Party qualified for the second round in its electoral debut.

In the second round, the PDP received 54.98% of the vote and won 30 of the 47 seats, while the BTP received 45.02% and won the remaining 17 seats. PDP leader Tshering Tobgay returned to office as prime minister, having previously served from 2013 to 2018.

== Background ==
In the 2018 elections the previously unrepresented Druk Nyamrup Tshogpa (DNT) won a majority of seats, with their leader Lotay Tshering becoming prime minister.

During the 2018–2023 term the DNT won four by-elections, retaining the seat of Monggar and winning the seats of Chhoekhor-Tang, Nganglam and Khamdang-Ramjar from Druk Phuensum Tshogpa (DPT), the former two being DPT strongholds that the party had never lost before.

In 2022 and 2023 two new parties were registered to compete in the 2023 elections—Druk Thuendrel Tshogpa and Bhutan Tendrel Party.

In January 2023 the Bhutan Kuen-Nyam Party (BKP) deregistered itself following years of low activity and difficulty with funding and finding a new party president. The BKP had come fourth in the 2018 elections.

== Electoral system ==
The 47 members of the National Assembly are elected from single-member constituencies. Primary elections are held in which voters cast votes for candidates of the registered parties. The votes for all candidates of the same party are then aggregated across the whole of the country. The two parties receiving the most votes advance to the second round, and are able to field the same or different candidates. Second round elections are held using first-past-the-post voting.

== Results ==
As the top two finishers in the primary round, the People's Democratic Party and Bhutan Tendrel Party advanced to the second round, where they contested for the 47 National Assembly seats. For the first time since the initial elections for the chamber in 2008, the DPT failed to make it past the primary round, and both incumbent parliamentary parties failed to return to the chamber. Only two women were elected, the lowest number since the initial elections in 2008.

Party	First round		Second round		Seats	+/–
Party	Votes	%	Votes	%	Seats	+/–
People's Democratic Party	133,217	42.54	179,652	54.98	30	+30
Bhutan Tendrel Party	61,331	19.58	147,123	45.02	17	New
Druk Phuensum Tshogpa	46,694	14.91			0	–17
Druk Nyamrup Tshogpa	41,106	13.13			0	–30
Druk Thuendrel Tshogpa	30,814	9.84			0	New
Total	313,162	100.00	326,775	100.00	47	0
Total votes	313,162	–	326,775	–		
Registered voters/turnout	497,058	63.00	498,135	65.60		
Source: First round: ECB, Kuensel; Second round: ECB, Kuensel

=== By constituency – first round ===
Constituency	Votes cast	First round			
Constituency	Votes cast	Party	Candidate	Votes	%
Athang-Thedtsho	7,620	People's Democratic Party	Tandin Wangchuk	3,328	43.67
Athang-Thedtsho	7,620	Druk Thuendrel Tshogpa	Nim Gyeltshen	1,565	20.54
Athang-Thedtsho	7,620	Bhutan Tendrel Party	Ugyen	990	12.99
Athang-Thedtsho	7,620	Druk Nyamrup Tshogpa	Kinley Wangchuk	922	12.10
Athang-Thedtsho	7,620	Druk Phuensum Tshogpa	Kinga Kinga	815	10.70
Bardo-Trong	7,579	People's Democratic Party	Lekey Dorji	3,632	47.92
Bardo-Trong	7,579	Druk Phuensum Tshogpa	Gyambo Tshering	1,786	23.57
Bardo-Trong	7,579	Bhutan Tendrel Party	Pema Dakpa	859	11.33
Bardo-Trong	7,579	Druk Thuendrel Tshogpa	Kezang	679	8.96
Bardo-Trong	7,579	Druk Nyamrup Tshogpa	Sonam Leki	623	8.22
Bartsham-Shongphu	7,563	People's Democratic Party	Kinzang Wangdi	2,386	31.55
Bartsham-Shongphu	7,563	Bhutan Tendrel Party	Rinchen Wangdi	2,355	31.14
Bartsham-Shongphu	7,563	Druk Phuensum Tshogpa	Pasang Dorji	1,342	17.74
Bartsham-Shongphu	7,563	Druk Nyamrup Tshogpa	Sonam Kinga	930	12.30
Bartsham-Shongphu	7,563	Druk Thuendrel Tshogpa	Sonam Phuntsho	550	7.27
Bji-Katsho-Eusu	2,949	People's Democratic Party	Lhendup Wangdi	1,633	55.37
Bji-Katsho-Eusu	2,949	Bhutan Tendrel Party	Tshering Dorji	626	21.23
Bji-Katsho-Eusu	2,949	Druk Nyamrup Tshogpa	Ugyen Tenzin	311	10.55
Bji-Katsho-Eusu	2,949	Druk Thuendrel Tshogpa	Dawa Gyelmo	220	7.46
Bji-Katsho-Eusu	2,949	Druk Phuensum Tshogpa	Nim Dem	159	5.39
Bongo-Chapcha	10,730	People's Democratic Party	Pempa	6,575	61.28
Bongo-Chapcha	10,730	Bhutan Tendrel Party	Pema Tenzin	1,321	12.31
Bongo-Chapcha	10,730	Druk Nyamrup Tshogpa	Tshewang Lhamo	1,234	11.50
Bongo-Chapcha	10,730	Druk Thuendrel Tshogpa	Purna Bahadur Chhetri	919	8.56
Bongo-Chapcha	10,730	Druk Phuensum Tshogpa	Sonam Pelden	681	6.35
Bumdeling-Jamkhar	6,242	People's Democratic Party	Thinley Wangchuk	2,024	32.43
Bumdeling-Jamkhar	6,242	Bhutan Tendrel Party	Wangdi	1,635	26.19
Bumdeling-Jamkhar	6,242	Druk Phuensum Tshogpa	Ngawang Tashi	1,456	23.33
Bumdeling-Jamkhar	6,242	Druk Nyamrup Tshogpa	Namgay Wangmo	573	9.18
Bumdeling-Jamkhar	6,242	Druk Thuendrel Tshogpa	Ugyen Rinzin	554	8.88
Chokhor-Tang	4,638	People's Democratic Party	Kuenzang Thinley	1,613	34.78
Chokhor-Tang	4,638	Druk Nyamrup Tshogpa	Dawa	1,406	30.31
Chokhor-Tang	4,638	Bhutan Tendrel Party	Pema Norbu	609	13.13
Chokhor-Tang	4,638	Druk Phuensum Tshogpa	Thinley Tshering	582	12.55
Chokhor-Tang	4,638	Druk Thuendrel Tshogpa	Nima Dorji	428	9.23
Chumey-Ura	2,749	People's Democratic Party	Sonam Rinchen	1,107	40.27
Chumey-Ura	2,749	Druk Phuensum Tshogpa	Karma Wangchuk	496	18.04
Chumey-Ura	2,749	Bhutan Tendrel Party	Tshering Lhadon	471	17.13
Chumey-Ura	2,749	Druk Nyamrup Tshogpa	Sonam Jamtsho	391	14.22
Chumey-Ura	2,749	Druk Thuendrel Tshogpa	Thinley Gyeltshen	284	10.33
Dewathang-Gomdar	10,647	People's Democratic Party	Kelzang Phuntsho	3,719	34.93
Dewathang-Gomdar	10,647	Bhutan Tendrel Party	Tshering Penjor	2,695	25.31
Dewathang-Gomdar	10,647	Druk Phuensum Tshogpa	Ugyen Dorji	2,654	24.93
Dewathang-Gomdar	10,647	Druk Nyamrup Tshogpa	Karma Sherab Thobgyal	818	7.68
Dewathang-Gomdar	10,647	Druk Thuendrel Tshogpa	Chundi Dorji	761	7.15
Dogar-Shaba	6,855	People's Democratic Party	Gem Tshering	3,131	45.67
Dogar-Shaba	6,855	Druk Nyamrup Tshogpa	Namgye Tshering	2,312	33.73
Dogar-Shaba	6,855	Bhutan Tendrel Party	Jigme	577	8.42
Dogar-Shaba	6,855	Druk Thuendrel Tshogpa	Jangchuk Tshomo	529	7.72
Dogar-Shaba	6,855	Druk Phuensum Tshogpa	Zacko	306	4.46
Dopchuchen-Tading	8,600	People's Democratic Party	Ugyen Lama	4,857	56.48
Dopchuchen-Tading	8,600	Bhutan Tendrel Party	Deepak Sunwar	1,442	16.77
Dopchuchen-Tading	8,600	Druk Nyamrup Tshogpa	Loknath Sharma	1,244	14.47
Dopchuchen-Tading	8,600	Druk Phuensum Tshogpa	Tara Man Ghalley	577	6.71
Dopchuchen-Tading	8,600	Druk Thuendrel Tshogpa	Tirtha Man Rai	480	5.58
Dragteng-Langthel	4,341	People's Democratic Party	Namgay Dorji	1,695	39.05
Dragteng-Langthel	4,341	Bhutan Tendrel Party	Dorji	869	20.02
Dragteng-Langthel	4,341	Druk Phuensum Tshogpa	Nidup Gyeltshen	737	16.98
Dragteng-Langthel	4,341	Druk Thuendrel Tshogpa	Tharchen	603	13.89
Dragteng-Langthel	4,341	Druk Nyamrup Tshogpa	Gem Dorji	437	10.07
Drametse-Ngatshang	9,820	People's Democratic Party	Tobgay Tobgay	3,638	37.05
Drametse-Ngatshang	9,820	Druk Phuensum Tshogpa	Ugyen Wangdi	2,497	25.43
Drametse-Ngatshang	9,820	Bhutan Tendrel Party	Kinzang Wangchuk	2,478	25.23
Drametse-Ngatshang	9,820	Druk Nyamrup Tshogpa	Jigme Dorji	698	7.11
Drametse-Ngatshang	9,820	Druk Thuendrel Tshogpa	Tenzin Wangchuk	509	5.18
Drujegang-Tseza	9,291	People's Democratic Party	Sonam Dorji	4,515	48.60
Drujegang-Tseza	9,291	Bhutan Tendrel Party	Nima Tshering	1,448	15.58
Drujegang-Tseza	9,291	Druk Thuendrel Tshogpa	Ganeshman Gurung	1,159	12.47
Drujegang-Tseza	9,291	Druk Phuensum Tshogpa	Chador Wangmo	1,094	11.77
Drujegang-Tseza	9,291	Druk Nyamrup Tshogpa	Tashi Penjor	1,075	11.57
Gangzur-Minjey	5,682	People's Democratic Party	Chimi Dorji	1,731	30.46
Gangzur-Minjey	5,682	Bhutan Tendrel Party	Loday Tsheten	1,375	24.20
Gangzur-Minjey	5,682	Druk Nyamrup Tshogpa	Kinga Penjore	1,196	21.05
Gangzur-Minjey	5,682	Druk Thuendrel Tshogpa	Sangay Dorji	731	12.87
Gangzur-Minjey	5,682	Druk Phuensum Tshogpa	Sonam Phuntsho	649	11.42
Gelephu	12,422	People's Democratic Party	Harka Singh Tamang	5,627	45.30
Gelephu	12,422	Druk Phuensum Tshogpa	Dechen Lhaden	2,399	19.31
Gelephu	12,422	Bhutan Tendrel Party	Karma Rinchen	2,261	18.20
Gelephu	12,422	Druk Nyamrup Tshogpa	Namgay Tashi	1,353	10.89
Gelephu	12,422	Druk Thuendrel Tshogpa	Karma Jurmin Thinley	782	6.30
Jomotshangkha-Martshala	8,076	People's Democratic Party	Yonten Phuntsho	3,112	38.53
Jomotshangkha-Martshala	8,076	Druk Phuensum Tshogpa	Norbu Wangzom	1,675	20.74
Jomotshangkha-Martshala	8,076	Bhutan Tendrel Party	Jigme Wangchuk	1,555	19.25
Jomotshangkha-Martshala	8,076	Druk Nyamrup Tshogpa	Dorji Tshering	1,044	12.93
Jomotshangkha-Martshala	8,076	Druk Thuendrel Tshogpa	Tshering Norbu	690	8.54
Kabji-Talo	7,549	People's Democratic Party	Namgyal Dorji	3,674	48.67
Kabji-Talo	7,549	Bhutan Tendrel Party	Tshering Dorji	1,471	19.49
Kabji-Talo	7,549	Druk Nyamrup Tshogpa	Tsencho Wangdi	1,284	17.01
Kabji-Talo	7,549	Druk Thuendrel Tshogpa	Kinzang Thinley	587	7.78
Kabji-Talo	7,549	Druk Phuensum Tshogpa	Sangay Phurba	533	7.06
Kanglung-Samkhar-Udzorong	8,008	Bhutan Tendrel Party	Pema Chewang	3,937	49.16
Kanglung-Samkhar-Udzorong	8,008	People's Democratic Party	Norbu Wangchuk	2,479	30.96
Kanglung-Samkhar-Udzorong	8,008	Druk Nyamrup Tshogpa	Tenzin Namgyel	552	6.89
Kanglung-Samkhar-Udzorong	8,008	Druk Phuensum Tshogpa	Karma Chhophel	538	6.72
Kanglung-Samkhar-Udzorong	8,008	Druk Thuendrel Tshogpa	Tshering Dorji	502	6.27
Kengkhar-Weringla	7,796	People's Democratic Party	Sonam Penjor	2,726	34.97
Kengkhar-Weringla	7,796	Druk Phuensum Tshogpa	Rinzin Jamtsho	2,076	26.63
Kengkhar-Weringla	7,796	Bhutan Tendrel Party	Dorji Wangmo	1,547	19.84
Kengkhar-Weringla	7,796	Druk Nyamrup Tshogpa	Kunzang Drukpa	736	9.44
Kengkhar-Weringla	7,796	Druk Thuendrel Tshogpa	Ugyen Thinley	711	9.12
Khamaed-Lunana	837	Bhutan Tendrel Party	Dhendup	275	32.86
Khamaed-Lunana	837	People's Democratic Party	Pema Drakpa	271	32.38
Khamaed-Lunana	837	Druk Nyamrup Tshogpa	Yeshey Dem	154	18.40
Khamaed-Lunana	837	Druk Phuensum Tshogpa	Sonam Chezom	95	11.35
Khamaed-Lunana	837	Druk Thuendrel Tshogpa	Kinley Dorji	42	5.02
Khamdang-Ramjar	6,215	Bhutan Tendrel Party	Namgay Dorji	2,463	39.63
Khamdang-Ramjar	6,215	People's Democratic Party	Kinley Dorji	1,695	27.27
Khamdang-Ramjar	6,215	Druk Phuensum Tshogpa	Tshering Tobgay	999	16.07
Khamdang-Ramjar	6,215	Druk Nyamrup Tshogpa	Karma Gyeltshen	724	11.65
Khamdang-Ramjar	6,215	Druk Thuendrel Tshogpa	Phuntsho Wangdi	334	5.37
Khar-Yurung	6,437	Druk Phuensum Tshogpa	Tshring Choden	2,012	31.26
Khar-Yurung	6,437	Bhutan Tendrel Party	Sangay Thinley	1,687	26.21
Khar-Yurung	6,437	People's Democratic Party	Lekden Zangmo	1,412	21.94
Khar-Yurung	6,437	Druk Thuendrel Tshogpa	Norbu	669	10.39
Khar-Yurung	6,437	Druk Nyamrup Tshogpa	Chenga Tshewang	657	10.21
Khatoe-Laya	881	Druk Nyamrup Tshogpa	Tenzin	322	36.55
Khatoe-Laya	881	People's Democratic Party	Lhaba Lhaba	218	24.74
Khatoe-Laya	881	Druk Thuendrel Tshogpa	Dorji Khandu	128	14.53
Khatoe-Laya	881	Druk Phuensum Tshogpa	Pema Wangchuk	123	13.96
Khatoe-Laya	881	Bhutan Tendrel Party	Ugyen Dem	90	10.22
Kilkhorthang-Mendrelgang	8,264	People's Democratic Party	Kamal Bahadur Gurung	4,134	50.02
Kilkhorthang-Mendrelgang	8,264	Bhutan Tendrel Party	Dhan Bdr Tamang	1,772	21.44
Kilkhorthang-Mendrelgang	8,264	Druk Thuendrel Tshogpa	Dhan Bahadur Chhetri	891	10.78
Kilkhorthang-Mendrelgang	8,264	Druk Nyamrup Tshogpa	Bimal Thapa	741	8.97
Kilkhorthang-Mendrelgang	8,264	Druk Phuensum Tshogpa	Sahadev Thapa	726	8.79
Lamgong-Wangchang	7,316	People's Democratic Party	Sonam Tashi	2,835	38.75
Lamgong-Wangchang	7,316	Druk Nyamrup Tshogpa	Ugyen Tshering	1,488	20.34
Lamgong-Wangchang	7,316	Bhutan Tendrel Party	Kunzang Dorji	1,265	17.29
Lamgong-Wangchang	7,316	Druk Phuensum Tshogpa	Tandin Dorji	868	11.86
Lamgong-Wangchang	7,316	Druk Thuendrel Tshogpa	Sangay Dorji	860	11.76
Lhamoidzingkha-Tashiding	8,013	People's Democratic Party	Chandra Bdr Gurung	5,091	63.53
Lhamoidzingkha-Tashiding	8,013	Bhutan Tendrel Party	Prakash Sharma	1,058	13.20
Lhamoidzingkha-Tashiding	8,013	Druk Thuendrel Tshogpa	Bishnulal Bhandari Chhetri	628	7.84
Lhamoidzingkha-Tashiding	8,013	Druk Nyamrup Tshogpa	Dorji Phuntsho	626	7.81
Lhamoidzingkha-Tashiding	8,013	Druk Phuensum Tshogpa	Krishna Bahadur Tamang	610	7.61
Lingmukha-Toewang	5,348	People's Democratic Party	Namgay Wangchuk	1,888	35.30
Lingmukha-Toewang	5,348	Druk Thuendrel Tshogpa	Sonam Wang	1,548	28.95
Lingmukha-Toewang	5,348	Druk Nyamrup Tshogpa	Tandi Dorji	1,019	19.05
Lingmukha-Toewang	5,348	Bhutan Tendrel Party	Gyambo Sithey	632	11.82
Lingmukha-Toewang	5,348	Druk Phuensum Tshogpa	Tenzin Tshewang	261	4.88
Menbi-Tsenkhar	5,681	People's Democratic Party	Yeshey Dorji	2,486	43.76
Menbi-Tsenkhar	5,681	Bhutan Tendrel Party	Tempa Dorji	1,352	23.80
Menbi-Tsenkhar	5,681	Druk Phuensum Tshogpa	Choki Gyeltshen	753	13.25
Menbi-Tsenkhar	5,681	Druk Nyamrup Tshogpa	Sonam Dargay	610	10.74
Menbi-Tsenkhar	5,681	Druk Thuendrel Tshogpa	Tshoki Lhamo	480	8.45
Mongar	7,802	People's Democratic Party	Sonam Dendup	3,030	38.84
Mongar	7,802	Bhutan Tendrel Party	Naiten Wangchuk	1,980	25.38
Mongar	7,802	Druk Nyamrup Tshogpa	Karma Lhamo	1,081	13.86
Mongar	7,802	Druk Phuensum Tshogpa	Ugyen Gyeltshen	950	12.18
Mongar	7,802	Druk Thuendrel Tshogpa	Sonam Pelzom	761	9.75
Nanong-Shumar	6,400	People's Democratic Party	Pema Wangchuk	1,559	24.36
Nanong-Shumar	6,400	Bhutan Tendrel Party	Yeshey Jamtsho	1,536	24.00
Nanong-Shumar	6,400	Druk Phuensum Tshogpa	Lungten Namgyel	1,386	21.66
Nanong-Shumar	6,400	Druk Nyamrup Tshogpa	Sonam Dhendup	1,129	17.64
Nanong-Shumar	6,400	Druk Thuendrel Tshogpa	Wangchuk	790	12.34
Nganglam	5,355	Druk Phuensum Tshogpa	Rinchen Pelzang	2,494	46.57
Nganglam	5,355	People's Democratic Party	Rinchen Khandu	1,158	21.62
Nganglam	5,355	Bhutan Tendrel Party	Lamdra Wangdi	923	17.24
Nganglam	5,355	Druk Nyamrup Tshogpa	Karma Dorji	572	10.68
Nganglam	5,355	Druk Thuendrel Tshogpa	Jambay Yeshey	208	3.88
Nisho-Sephu	8,297	People's Democratic Party	Kuenga	4,038	48.67
Nisho-Sephu	8,297	Druk Nyamrup Tshogpa	Wangchuk Namgyel	1,383	16.67
Nisho-Sephu	8,297	Druk Thuendrel Tshogpa	Tashi Penjor Dorji	1,179	14.21
Nisho-Sephu	8,297	Bhutan Tendrel Party	Karma Dorji	1,141	13.75
Nisho-Sephu	8,297	Druk Phuensum Tshogpa	Ugyen Tshering	556	6.70
North Thimphu	4,375	People's Democratic Party	Tshering	1,602	36.62
North Thimphu	4,375	Bhutan Tendrel Party	Sonam M Penjor	959	21.92
North Thimphu	4,375	Druk Thuendrel Tshogpa	Kinga Tshering	669	15.29
North Thimphu	4,375	Druk Nyamrup Tshogpa	Dechen Wangmo	632	14.45
North Thimphu	4,375	Druk Phuensum Tshogpa	Namgyel Wangdi	513	11.73
Nubi-Tangsibji	3,174	People's Democratic Party	Phuntsho Dendup	1,049	33.05
Nubi-Tangsibji	3,174	Druk Phuensum Tshogpa	Zhungchuk	618	19.47
Nubi-Tangsibji	3,174	Druk Thuendrel Tshogpa	Tashi Samdrup	556	17.52
Nubi-Tangsibji	3,174	Druk Nyamrup Tshogpa	Yeshi Penjor	533	16.79
Nubi-Tangsibji	3,174	Bhutan Tendrel Party	Tashi Dorji	418	13.17
Panbang	5,991	People's Democratic Party	Lungten Dorji	2,628	43.87
Panbang	5,991	Druk Phuensum Tshogpa	Dorji Wangdi	2,104	35.12
Panbang	5,991	Bhutan Tendrel Party	Dorji Cheten	623	10.40
Panbang	5,991	Druk Nyamrup Tshogpa	Tshering Lhendrup	375	6.26
Panbang	5,991	Druk Thuendrel Tshogpa	Karma Dema	261	4.36
Phuentsholing	7,950	People's Democratic Party	Rinzin Dorji	4,619	58.10
Phuentsholing	7,950	Druk Nyamrup Tshogpa	JB Rai	1,372	17.26
Phuentsholing	7,950	Bhutan Tendrel Party	Maita Raj Rai	879	11.06
Phuentsholing	7,950	Druk Thuendrel Tshogpa	Damcho Gyetshen	592	7.45
Phuentsholing	7,950	Druk Phuensum Tshogpa	Natra Ghalley	488	6.14
Phuentshopelri-Samtse	6,979	People's Democratic Party	DN Dhungyel	3,863	55.35
Phuentshopelri-Samtse	6,979	Bhutan Tendrel Party	Pasang Dorji	1,355	19.42
Phuentshopelri-Samtse	6,979	Druk Phuensum Tshogpa	Sonam Lepcha	665	9.53
Phuentshopelri-Samtse	6,979	Druk Nyamrup Tshogpa	Ngawang Nidup	638	9.14
Phuentshopelri-Samtse	6,979	Druk Thuendrel Tshogpa	Subash Sharma	458	6.56
Radhi-Sakten	6,894	People's Democratic Party	Sonam Wangchuk	2,388	34.64
Radhi-Sakten	6,894	Bhutan Tendrel Party	Tashi Tenzin	1,523	22.09
Radhi-Sakten	6,894	Druk Phuensum Tshogpa	Tenzin Jamtsho	1,130	16.39
Radhi-Sakten	6,894	Druk Nyamrup Tshogpa	Dorji Tshering	1,109	16.09
Radhi-Sakten	6,894	Druk Thuendrel Tshogpa	Tashi Dorji	744	10.79
Sergithang-Tsirang Toed	7,759	People's Democratic Party	Lhakpa Tamang	4,206	54.21
Sergithang-Tsirang Toed	7,759	Bhutan Tendrel Party	Gopal Thapa	1,023	13.18
Sergithang-Tsirang Toed	7,759	Druk Phuensum Tshogpa	Sarvajit Rai	954	12.30
Sergithang-Tsirang Toed	7,759	Druk Nyamrup Tshogpa	Garja Man Rai	890	11.47
Sergithang-Tsirang Toed	7,759	Druk Thuendrel Tshogpa	Kewal Ram Adhikari	686	8.84
Shompangkha	9,175	People's Democratic Party	Tek Bhadur Rai	4,865	53.02
Shompangkha	9,175	Bhutan Tendrel Party	Lachuman Ghalley	1,586	17.29
Shompangkha	9,175	Druk Phuensum Tshogpa	Tsedrup	1,065	11.61
Shompangkha	9,175	Druk Nyamrup Tshogpa	Tek Bdr Rai	959	10.45
Shompangkha	9,175	Druk Thuendrel Tshogpa	Susan Lama	700	7.63
Somgbaykha	2,778	People's Democratic Party	Tshering Tobgay	2,133	76.78
Somgbaykha	2,778	Bhutan Tendrel Party	Ngawang Tobgay	226	8.14
Somgbaykha	2,778	Druk Nyamrup Tshogpa	Dorji Wangmo	153	5.51
Somgbaykha	2,778	Druk Thuendrel Tshogpa	Jampel Dorji	136	4.90
Somgbaykha	2,778	Druk Phuensum Tshogpa	Sonam Peljore	130	4.68
South Thimphu	6,223	Druk Nyamrup Tshogpa	Lotay Tshering	2,006	32.24
South Thimphu	6,223	People's Democratic Party	Tshewang Rinzin	1,747	28.07
South Thimphu	6,223	Bhutan Tendrel Party	Tandin Tshering	980	15.75
South Thimphu	6,223	Druk Thuendrel Tshogpa	Kinlay Dorjee	835	13.42
South Thimphu	6,223	Druk Phuensum Tshogpa	Sangay Tshering	655	10.53
Tashicholing	8,381	People's Democratic Party	Sangay Khandu	3,627	43.28
Tashicholing	8,381	Druk Phuensum Tshogpa	Namgay	1,657	19.77
Tashicholing	8,381	Druk Thuendrel Tshogpa	Mani Kumar Ghalay	1,260	15.03
Tashicholing	8,381	Bhutan Tendrel Party	Ritu Raj Chhetri	931	11.11
Tashicholing	8,381	Druk Nyamrup Tshogpa	Amina Gurung	906	10.81
Thrimshing	5,213	People's Democratic Party	Dorji Choden	2,140	41.05
Thrimshing	5,213	Druk Thuendrel Tshogpa	Chenga Tshering	1,048	20.10
Thrimshing	5,213	Bhutan Tendrel Party	Damche Tenzin	881	16.90
Thrimshing	5,213	Druk Phuensum Tshogpa	Ugyen Dorji	608	11.66
Thrimshing	5,213	Druk Nyamrup Tshogpa	Ugyen Dorji	536	10.28
Ugyentse-Yoeseltse	6,555	People's Democratic Party	Dimple Thapa	3,523	53.75
Ugyentse-Yoeseltse	6,555	Bhutan Tendrel Party	Pushparaj Humagai	1,176	17.94
Ugyentse-Yoeseltse	6,555	Druk Nyamrup Tshogpa	Dinish Kumar Pradhan	747	11.40
Ugyentse-Yoeseltse	6,555	Druk Thuendrel Tshogpa	Deo Raj Ghalley	576	8.79
Ugyentse-Yoeseltse	6,555	Druk Phuensum Tshogpa	Bharat Bahadur Pradhan	533	8.13
Wamrong	5,712	Bhutan Tendrel Party	Lam Dorji	2,076	36.34
Wamrong	5,712	People's Democratic Party	Yeshey Nidup	1,810	31.69
Wamrong	5,712	Druk Phuensum Tshogpa	Sonam Tshering	689	12.06
Wamrong	5,712	Druk Nyamrup Tshogpa	Jigme Wangdi	605	10.59
Wamrong	5,712	Druk Thuendrel Tshogpa	Lhatu	532	9.31
Source: Primary round General round

=== By constituency – second round ===
Constituency	Votes cast	Second round			
Constituency	Votes cast	Party	Candidate	Votes	%
Athang-Thedtsho	7,510	People's Democratic Party	Tandin Wangchuk	4,231	56.34
Athang-Thedtsho	7,510	Bhutan Tendrel Party	Ugyen	3,279	43.66
Bardo-Trong	7610	People's Democratic Party	Lekey Dorji	4,656	61.18
Bardo-Trong	7610	Bhutan Tendrel Party	Pema Dakpa	2,954	38.82
Bartsham-Shongphu	7,650	People's Democratic Party	Kinzang Wangdi	3,174	41.49
Bartsham-Shongphu	7,650	Bhutan Tendrel Party	Rinchen Wangdi	4,476	58.51
Bji-Katsho-Eusu	2,970	People's Democratic Party	Lhendup Wangdi	1,804	60.74
Bji-Katsho-Eusu	2,970	Bhutan Tendrel Party	Tshering Dorji	1,166	39.26
Bongo-Chapcha	11,359	People's Democratic Party	Pempa	8,131	71.58
Bongo-Chapcha	11,359	Bhutan Tendrel Party	Pema Tenzin	3,228	28.42
Bumdeling-Jamkhar	6,247	People's Democratic Party	Thinley Wangchuk	2,735	43.78
Bumdeling-Jamkhar	6,247	Bhutan Tendrel Party	Wangdi	3,512	56.22
Chokhor-Tang	4,469	People's Democratic Party	Kuenzang Thinley	2,476	55.40
Chokhor-Tang	4,469	Bhutan Tendrel Party	Pema Norbu	1,993	44.60
Chumey-Ura	2,656	People's Democratic Party	Sonam Rinchen	1,446	54.44
Chumey-Ura	2,656	Bhutan Tendrel Party	Tshering Lhadon	1,210	45.56
Dewathang-Gomdar	11,187	People's Democratic Party	Kelzang Phuntsho	4,887	43.68
Dewathang-Gomdar	11,187	Bhutan Tendrel Party	Tshering Penjor	6,300	56.32
Dogar-Shaba	6,359	People's Democratic Party	Gem Tshering	4,083	64.21
Dogar-Shaba	6,359	Bhutan Tendrel Party	Jigme	2,276	35.79
Dopchuchen-Tading	10,270	People's Democratic Party	Ugyen Lama	6,914	67.32
Dopchuchen-Tading	10,270	Bhutan Tendrel Party	Deepak Sunwar	3,356	32.68
Dragteng-Langthel	4,428	People's Democratic Party	Namgay Dorji	2,461	55.58
Dragteng-Langthel	4,428	Bhutan Tendrel Party	Dorji	1,967	44.42
Drametse-Ngatshang	9,736	People's Democratic Party	Tobgay Tobgay	4,074	41.73
Drametse-Ngatshang	9,736	Bhutan Tendrel Party	Kinzang Wangchuk	5,689	58.27
Drujegang-Tseza	9,753	People's Democratic Party	Sonam Dorji	5,906	60.56
Drujegang-Tseza	9,753	Bhutan Tendrel Party	Nima Tshering	3,847	39.44
Gangzur-Minjey	5,551	People's Democratic Party	Chimi Dorji	2,385	42.97
Gangzur-Minjey	5,551	Bhutan Tendrel Party	Loday Tsheten	3,166	57.03
Gelephu	13.338	People's Democratic Party	Harka Singh Tamang	7,136	53.50
Gelephu	13.338	Bhutan Tendrel Party	Karma Rinchen	6,202	46.50
Jomotshangkha-Martshala	8,480	People's Democratic Party	Yonten Phuntsho	4,440	52.36
Jomotshangkha-Martshala	8,480	Bhutan Tendrel Party	Jigme Wangchuk	4,040	47.64
Kabji-Talo	7,318	People's Democratic Party	Namgyal Dorji	4,421	60.41
Kabji-Talo	7,318	Bhutan Tendrel Party	Tshering Dorji	2,897	39.59
Kanglung-Samkhar-Udzorong	7,927	Bhutan Tendrel Party	Pema Chewang	5,304	66.91
Kanglung-Samkhar-Udzorong	7,927	People's Democratic Party	Norbu Wangchuk	2,623	33.09
Kengkhar-Weringla	7,802	People's Democratic Party	Sonam Penjor	3,298	42.27
Kengkhar-Weringla	7,802	Bhutan Tendrel Party	Dorji Wangmo	4,504	57.73
Khamaed-Lunana	961	Bhutan Tendrel Party	Dhendup	430	44.75
Khamaed-Lunana	961	People's Democratic Party	Pema Drakpa	531	55.25
Khamdang-Ramjar	6,324	Bhutan Tendrel Party	Namgay Dorji	4,169	65.92
Khamdang-Ramjar	6,324	People's Democratic Party	Kinley Dorji	2,155	34.08
Khar-Yurung	6,487	Bhutan Tendrel Party	Sangay Thinley	4,448	68.57
Khar-Yurung	6,487	People's Democratic Party	Lekden Zangmo	2,039	31.43
Khatoe-Laya	910	People's Democratic Party	Lhaba Lhaba	688	75.60
Khatoe-Laya	910	Bhutan Tendrel Party	Ugyen Dem	222	24.40
Kilkhorthang-Mendrelgang	9,747	People's Democratic Party	Kamal Bahadur Gurung	5,800	59.51
Kilkhorthang-Mendrelgang	9,747	Bhutan Tendrel Party	Dhan Bdr Tamang	3,947	40.49
Lamgong-Wangchang	7,117	People's Democratic Party	Sonam Tashi	4,237	59.53
Lamgong-Wangchang	7,117	Bhutan Tendrel Party	Kunzang Dorji	2,880	40.47
Lhamoidzingkha-Tashiding	9,496	People's Democratic Party	Chandra Bdr Gurung	7,218	76.01
Lhamoidzingkha-Tashiding	9,496	Bhutan Tendrel Party	Prakash Sharma	2,278	23.99
Lingmukha-Toewang	5,041	People's Democratic Party	Namgay Wangchuk	2,835	56.24
Lingmukha-Toewang	5,041	Bhutan Tendrel Party	Gyambo Sithey	2,206	43.76
Menbi-Tsenkhar	5,940	People's Democratic Party	Yeshey Dorji	2,853	48.03
Menbi-Tsenkhar	5,940	Bhutan Tendrel Party	Tempa Dorji	3,087	51.97
Mongar	7,755	People's Democratic Party	Sonam Dendup	3,278	42.27
Mongar	7,755	Bhutan Tendrel Party	Naiten Wangchuk	4,477	57.73
Nanong-Shumar	6,467	People's Democratic Party	Pema Wangchuk	2,212	34.20
Nanong-Shumar	6,467	Bhutan Tendrel Party	Yeshey Jamtsho	4,255	65.80
Nganglam	5,230	People's Democratic Party	Rinchen Khandu	1,590	30.40
Nganglam	5,230	Bhutan Tendrel Party	Lamdra Wangdi	3,640	69.60
Nisho-Sephu	8,061	People's Democratic Party	Kuenga	5,038	62.50
Nisho-Sephu	8,061	Bhutan Tendrel Party	Karma Dorji	3,023	37.50
North Thimphu	4,144	People's Democratic Party	Tshering	2,357	56.88
North Thimphu	4,144	Bhutan Tendrel Party	Sonam M Penjor	1,787	43.12
Nubi-Tangsibji	3,002	People's Democratic Party	Phuntsho Dendup	1,373	45.74
Nubi-Tangsibji	3,002	Bhutan Tendrel Party	Tashi Dorji	1,629	54.26
Panbang	5,932	People's Democratic Party	Lungten Dorji	3,716	62.64
Panbang	5,932	Bhutan Tendrel Party	Dorji Cheten	2,216	37.36
Phuentsholing	8,958	People's Democratic Party	Rinzin Dorji	6,766	75.53
Phuentsholing	8,958	Bhutan Tendrel Party	Maita Raj Rai	2,192	24.47
Phuentshopelri-Samtse	8,618	People's Democratic Party	DN Dhungyel	5,912	68.60
Phuentshopelri-Samtse	8,618	Bhutan Tendrel Party	Pasang Dorji	2,706	31.40
Radhi-Sakten	6,821	People's Democratic Party	Sonam Wangchuk	3,231	47.37
Radhi-Sakten	6,821	Bhutan Tendrel Party	Tashi Tenzin	3,590	52.63
Sergithang-Tsirang Toed	9,040	People's Democratic Party	Lhakpa Tamang	6,338	70.11
Sergithang-Tsirang Toed	9,040	Bhutan Tendrel Party	Gopal Thapa	2,702	29.89
Shompangkha	10,648	People's Democratic Party	Tek Bhadur Rai	6,592	61.91
Shompangkha	10,648	Bhutan Tendrel Party	Lachuman Ghalley	4,056	38.09
Somgbaykha	2,615	People's Democratic Party	Tshering Tobgay	2,337	89.37
Somgbaykha	2,615	Bhutan Tendrel Party	Sonam Peljore	278	10.63
South Thimphu	5,889	People's Democratic Party	Tshewang Rinzin	2,962	50.30
South Thimphu	5,889	Bhutan Tendrel Party	Tandin Tshering	2,927	49.70
Tashicholing	9,990	People's Democratic Party	Sangay Khandu	6,478	64.84
Tashicholing	9,990	Bhutan Tendrel Party	Ritu Raj Chhetri	3,512	35.16
Thrimshing	5,123	People's Democratic Party	Dorji Choden	2,443	47.69
Thrimshing	5,123	Bhutan Tendrel Party	Damche Tenzin	2,680	52.31
Ugyentse-Yoeseltse	8,080	People's Democratic Party	Dimple Thapa	5,284	65.40
Ugyentse-Yoeseltse	8,080	Bhutan Tendrel Party	Pushparaj Humagai	2,796	34.60
Wamrong	5,732	Bhutan Tendrel Party	Lam Dorji	3,624	63.22
Wamrong	5,732	People's Democratic Party	Yeshey Nidup	2,108	36.78
Source: ECB

== Aftermath ==
In September 2025, a by-election was held in Nubi-Tangsibji following the resignation of BTP MP Tashi Dorji after he was arrested on child molestation charges. The by-election was won by PDP candidate Phuntsho Dendup, with 57.4% of the vote to 42.6% for the BTP candidate.
