= List of political parties in Bhutan =

In Bhutan, political parties need to be registered with Election Commission to contest National Assembly elections. Political parties can only contest National Assembly elections, since being an independent is a requirement for contesting National Council and local government elections.

Besides the official registered parties that came into existence after the democratisation of Bhutan, many Bhutanese parties have been operating in exile since the 1990s. Most of these parties are run by exiled people from the Lhotshampa community from the refugee camps in Nepal.

== Official parties ==
In Bhutan, political parties need to be registered with Election Commission of Bhutan to participate in the Bhutanese elections.

=== Active parties ===
Party	Abbr.	Registered	Ideology	Position	Assembly seats
People's Democratic Party མི་སེར་དམངས་གཙོའི་ཚོགས་པ་།	PDP	2007	Liberalism; Royalism	Centre-left	30 / 47
Druk Phuensum Tshogpa འབྲུག་ཕུན་སུམ་ཚོགས་པ།	DPT	2007	Conservatism; Royalism	Centre-right	0 / 47
Druk Nyamrup Tshogpa འབྲུག་མཉམ་རུབ་ཚོགས་པ་།	DNT	2013	Social democracy	Centre-left	0 / 47
Druk Thuendrel Tshogpa འབྲུག་མཐུན་འབྲེལ་ཚོགས་པ།	DTT	2022	Buddhist capitalism		0 / 47
Bhutan Tendrel Party བྷུ་ཊཱན་རྟེན་འབྲེལ་ཚོགས་པ་།	BTP	2023	Moderate conservatism; Royalism	Centre to centre-right	17 / 47

=== Deregistered parties ===
In 2018, Druk Chirwang Tshogpa was deregistered by the Election Commission on its own request.

In 2023, the Bhutan Kuen-Nyam Party deregistered after years of low activity. The party had failed to find a new leader after Neten Zangmo resigned the position in 2018.

== Other political parties ==
The following unregistered parties operated within Bhutan.

- Druk Gaki Tshogpa would try register with the Election Commission ahead of the 2018 National Assembly election but would be rejected on 17 March on the grounds of irregularities, lack of grounded ideology and national policy. The DGT would appeal to the High Court to overturn the ECB's decisions but would dismiss the case. The party would fizzle out by 2020.
- Druk Kuenphen Tshogpa tried registering with the Election Commission ahead of 2018 and failed but continues to exist.

The following parties are all based in exile.

- Bhutan Democratic Socialist Party
- Bhutan Gorkha National Liberation Front
- Bhutan National Congress
- Bhutan National Democratic Party
- Bhutan National Party
- Bhutan Peoples' Party
- Bhutanese Movement Steering Committee
- Communist Party of Bhutan (Marxist–Leninist–Maoist)
  - Bhutan Tiger Force
- Druk National Congress

The Druk National Congress was formed in exile in Kathmandu, Nepal on June 16, 1994.

On August 26, 2010, Bhutanese political parties in exile formed an umbrella group to pursue a "unified democratic movement led by Rongthong Kunley Dorji, President of the Druk National Congress. The group's offices opened in Kathmandu in November 2010, and it seems to receive some measure of support from the Nepalese government.

== See also ==
- Politics of Bhutan
- Constitution of Bhutan
- Lists of political parties
