= Lily Wangchuk =

Bhutanese politician (born 1972)

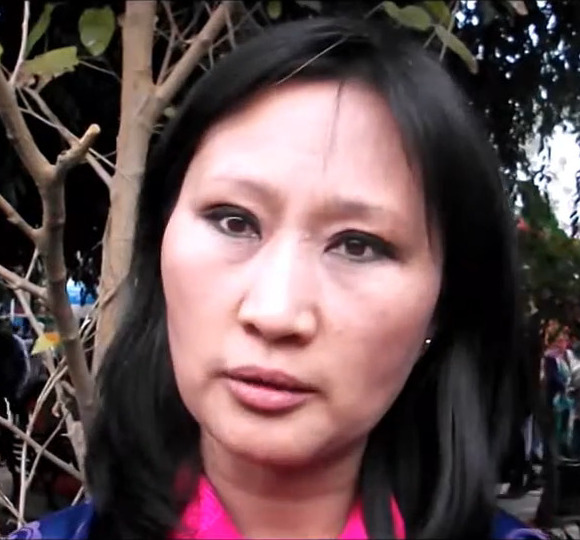
- Wangchuk in 2014

Personal details
- Born: October 15, 1972 (age 53)
- Party: Druk Phuensum Tshogpa
- Education: Miranda College (BA); Australian National University (MPP); Indian Academy of International Law and Diplomacy (PGD)
- Occupation: Politician, diplomat, activist

Lily Wangchuk or Lily Wangchhuk (born October 15, 1972) is a Bhutanese politician, diplomat and activist. A diplomat between 1994 and 2008, in November 2012 she became the first Bhutanese woman to be appointed president of a political party.

== Background and education ==
Wangchuk was born into a noble family. Her grandfather, Rinzin Dorji, served as the last Daga Penlop under the second King Jigme Wangchuck and third King Jigme Dorji Wangchuk. Her father died when she was very young and her mother left the family to become a nun. Wangchuk earned a Bachelor of Arts in Political Science at Miranda College in India. She earned a Master of Public Policy in International Diplomacy at the Australian National University, and a Postgraduate diploma in Human Rights and International Law at the Indian Academy of International Law and Diplomacy.

== Career ==
Wangchuk began work as a diplomat in 1994, and in 2003 she was a recipient of the Lions Club Award for Outstanding Diplomat for her work with Bhutanese bilateral relations with India. After a 12-year career as a diplomat, she took time off to travel across Bhutan, visiting all 20 districts and the remotest areas of the country, during which she observed the socioeconomic challenges facing common people and inequalities in development.

Wangchuk once served as the executive director of the Bhutan Media Foundation (BMF) and head of the People's Democratic Party's women wing. Soon after leaving BMF to pursue a career as a politician, in October 2011 she was diagnosed with endometrial cancer and overcame the disease in six months. In November 2012, Wangchuk became the first Bhutanese woman to be appointed president of a political party, Druk Chirwang Tshogpa, a party which was formally recognized in early 2013. She was a candidate for presidency during the 2013 elections, and represents North Thimphu Constituency. Wangchuk cites Aung San Suu Kyi as an inspiration in her leadership.

She ran for the seat of the National Assembly of Bhutan as a candidate of Druk Phuensum Tshogpa (DPT) from North Thimphu constituency in the 2018 Bhutanese National Assembly election, but was unsuccessful. She came in second, receiving 2,102 votes and losing the seat to Dechen Wangmo.
