= Druk Thuendrel Tshogpa =

Bhutanese political party

Druk Thuendrel Tshogpa འབྲུག་མཐུན་འབྲེལ་ཚོགས་པ།
- Abbreviation: DTT
- President: Kinga Tshering
- Founded: 2 May 2022
- Registered: 22 August 2022
- Split from: Druk Phuensum Tshogpa
- Headquarters: Trashigang
- Ideology: Buddhist capitalism
- Seats in the National Assembly: 0 / 47

Election symbol
- Sun and blue sky

Website
- thuendrel.org

The Druk Thuendrel Tshogpa (DTT; Dzongkha: འབྲུག་མཐུན་འབྲེལ་ཚོགས་པ།, lit. 'Bhutan Alliance Party' or 'Bhutan Goodwill Party' or 'Bhutan Fellowship Party' or 'Bhutan Friendship Party', also 'Unity Party of Bhutan') is a political party in Bhutan. It is headed by Kinga Tshering, a former member of parliament who represented the DPT from North Thimphu constituency following the 2013 elections.

== Ideology ==
In their 2023 campaign manifesto, the DTT centred their concept of "Sunomics" (from "sun"—the party's logo—and "economics"), which they say is based in "Buddhist Capitalism with the spirit of GNH." The party pledged to cut regulations, increase resource extraction, introduce private healthcare services, and to facilitate offshore banking.

== Election results ==
=== National Assembly ===
Election	First round		Second round		Seats	+/–	Outcome
Election	Votes	%	Votes	%	Seats	+/–	Outcome
2023–24	30,814	9.84%	Did not qualify		0 / 47	New	Extra-parliamentary
