= Lhendup Dorji =

Bhutanese aristocrat and politician

Prime Minister of Bhutan Acting
- In office 25 July 1964 – 27 November 1964
- Monarch: Jigme Dorji
- Preceded by: Jigme Palden Dorji
- Succeeded by: Jigme Thinley

Personal details
- Born: 6 October 1935 Bhutan House, Kalimpong, India
- Died: 15 April 2007 (aged 71) Lungtenphu, Thimphu
- Spouse: Glenda Anne Dorji
- Children: 4
- Parent(s): Sonam Topgay Dorji; Chuni Wangmo
- Education: Cornell University

Dasho Lhendup Dorji (Dzongkha: ལྷུན་གྲུབ་རྡོ་རྗེ, 6 October 1935 – 15 April 2007) was a member of the Dorji family of Bhutan. He was also the brother of the Queen of Bhutan, Ashi Kesang choden and uncle to the fourth king of Bhutan, King Jigme Singye Wangchuck. He served as acting Lyonchen (Prime Minister) following the assassination of his brother, Lyonchen Jigme Palden Dorji, on April 5, 1964.

== Early life and education ==
Lhendup Dorji was born to Gongzim Raja Sonam Topgay Dorji and Princess Rani Chuni Wangmo of Sikkim on October 6, 1935, at Bhutan House, Kalimpong, India. He studied at the St. Joseph's School, Darjeeling, at the Choate Preparatory School and then went to the United States attending Cornell University, which he graduated from in 1959. He was the first Bhutanese to study in America. Dorji was an avid hunter and excelled in athletics, such as boxing, golf, and tennis.

== Career ==
Dorji returned to Bhutan from the United States and his first assignment was to measure the length and breadth of the country; He spent months traveling around Bhutan calculating the terrain by hand using the most readily available measuring systems. He later served as Postmaster General, Paro Thrimpon, Deputy and later Secretary General of the country's Development Wing. He was conferred The Red Scarf by the Third Druk Gyalpo Jigme Dorji Wangchuck in 1958. An avid sports man Dorji was the first Bhutanese to win various golf and tennis tournaments in Nepal and in India. In 1965, with the approval of the National Assembly, Lhendup Dorji and several members of his family were exiled. He lived a colourful, vibrant, successful and popular life in Nepal.Following the King's death, Lhendup was permitted to return to Bhutan in 1974 with the support of his sister, Queen Kesang Choden.

== Popularity and death ==
He was a popular personality in the Calcutta racing circuit as well as in the United Kingdom.

He is referenced by Shirley MacLaine in her book, "Don't Fall Off the Mountain", which documents a visit she made to Bhutan during which she met him. Lhendup also sometimes made his own approximation of Bhutanese curry.

Dorji's nephew, Jigme Singye Wangchuck, went on to become the fourth Dragon King of Bhutan. On April 15, 2007, he died of cancer in Lungtenphu, Thimphu.

== Honours ==
- Bhutan :
  - The Royal Red Scarf (1958).
  - King Jigme Singye Investiture Medal (2 June 1974).
  - Commemorative Silver Jubilee Medal of King Jigme Singye (2 June 1999).

== Ancestry ==
Ancestors of Lhendup Dorji

16. Pala Gyeltshen
8. Sherpa Puchung, Dzongpon
17. a Lady from Tsento, Paro
4. Raja Ugyen Dorji
9. Tsherim, a Lady from Tsento, Paro
2. Raja Sonam Tobgye Dorji
1. Lhendup Dorji
24. Tenzing Namgyal, 6th Maharaja of Sikkim
12. Tsugphud Namgyal, 7th Maharaja of Sikkim
25. Anyo Karwang
6. Sir Thutob Namgyal, 9th Maharaja of Sikkim
13. Maharani Menchi
3. Rani Mayum Chonying Wangmo Dorji
14. Shiafe Uthok, of the Lhading House of Lhasa
7. Yeshay Dolma

== See also ==
- List of prime ministers of Bhutan
- House of Wangchuck

Political offices
| Preceded by Jigme Palden Dorji | Prime Minister of Bhutan (acting); July – November 1964 | Succeeded by post abolished 1964–1998; Jigme Thinley (1998) |
