= Rinzin Dorji (disambiguation) =

Rinzin Dorji may refer to:

- Rinzin Dorji, former Foreign Minister of Bhutan
- Rinzin Dorji, last DagaPenlop under the second King Jigme Wangchuk and third King Jigme Dorji Wangchuk, grandfather of Lily Wangchuk
- Rinzin Dorji (athlete), runner
