= Development Challenges in Bhutan =

2017 edited volume by Johannes Dragsbæk Schmidt

Development Challenges in Bhutan: Perspectives on Inequality and Gross National Happiness
- Authors: Michael Hutt; Winnie Bothe; Mahmood Ansari; Mari Miyamoto; Richard W. Whitecross; Norbert Wildermuth; Devi Bhakta Suberi; Caroline Brassard; Mahmood Ansari; Line Kikkenborg Christensen
- Language: English
- Subject: Development Economics
- Genre: Nonfiction
- Published: 2017
- Publisher: Springer Nature
- Publication place: United Kingdom
- Media type: Hardcover
- Pages: 265
- ISBN: 978-3-31947924-8
- LC Class: 2017934481

Development Challenges in Bhutan: Perspectives on Inequality and Gross National Happiness is an edited volume by Johannes Dragsbæk Schmidt and belongs to the Contemporary South Asian Studies book series published by Springer Nature.

== Background ==
The book consists of 10 chapters written by different authors and offers an academic perspective on the development challenges faced by Bhutan. It provides a deep insights into the country's unique development approach—the concept of Gross National Happiness. Furthermore, the book presents a comprehensive and critical assessment of Bhutan's political economy, focusing on key areas such as education policy, health, information and communication technology (ICT), and migration.

== Reception ==
In Asian Affairs, Wolfgang Drechsler writes, "This book has an outsider's perspective to an extent that is astonishing for our time, i.e., hardly anyone from Bhutan was asked to join the effort, and it hardly ever takes Bhutanese approaches seriously. Rather, the authors seem perennially discontented that Bhutan has not taken "the road to Denmark", refusing to develop in what they suggest to be a more equitable way, but which mostly seems more neo-liberal in (quantitative) methods and values."

Writing for Mountain Research and Development, Frank Rennie of the University of the Highlands and Islands writes, "This book makes a very useful start to the deeper critical scrutiny of those issues, but what seems to be missing is the injection of any Bhutanese voice—any real contextual analysis of pragmatic politics."
