= Kinzang Dorji =

6th Prime Minister of Bhutan

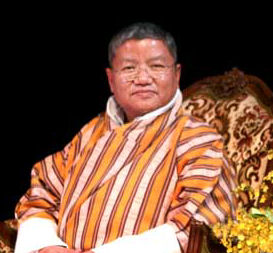
- Kinzang Dorji in 2007

6th Prime Minister of Bhutan
- In office 3 August 2007 – 9 April 2008
- Monarch: Jigme Khesar Namgyal Wangchuck
- Preceded by: Khandu Wangchuk
- Succeeded by: Jigme Thinley
- In office 24 August 2002 – 30 August 2003
- Monarch: Jigme Singye Wangchuck
- Preceded by: Khandu Wangchuk
- Succeeded by: Jigme Thinley

Personal details
- Born: 19 February 1951 (age 74) Chhali Gewog, Bhutan

Lyonpo Kinzang Dorji (born 19 February 1951) is a two-time former Prime Minister of Bhutan from 2002 to 2003 and again from 2007 to 2008. He was the chairman of Royal Monetary Authority of Bhutan from 2007 to 2008.

He was the speaker of the National Assembly from 1997 to 2000.

Kinzang Dorji served as prime minister from August 14, 2002 to August 30, 2003. He was Minister of Works and Human Settlement before being sworn in as prime minister again, in a caretaker capacity, on August 2, 2007. This followed the resignations of Prime Minister Khandu Wangchuk and other ministers, who intended to stand in the 2008 general election. Following the election, held in March 2008, Kinzang Dorji was succeeded by Jigme Thinley on April 9, 2008.

Political offices
Preceded by Khandu Wangchuk	Prime Minister of Bhutan; 2002–2003	Succeeded by Jigme Thinley
Preceded by Khandu Wangchuk	Prime Minister of Bhutan; 2007–2008	Succeeded by Jigme Thinley
