= Bhutan Tendrel Party =

Bhutanese political party

Bhutan Tendrel Party བྷུ་ཊཱན་རྟེན་འབྲེལ་ཚོགས་པ།
- Abbreviation: BTP
- President: Pema Chewang
- Founded: November 2022
- Registered: 9 January 2023
- Headquarters: Thimphu
- Ideology: Royalism; Moderate conservatism
- Political position: Centre to centre-right
- Slogan: Your Voice. Your Hope.
- Seats in the National Assembly: 16 / 47

Election symbol
- Elephant

The Bhutan Tendrel Party (BTP; Dzongkha: བྷུ་ཊཱན་རྟེན་འབྲེལ་ཚོགས་པ།) is a political party in Bhutan. It was founded by Pema Chewang after his resignation as Secretary of the National Land Commission in November 2022.

Following election guidelines, the party held a "convention for registration" on 29 November 2022. During the meeting, core party members, supporters, and dzongkhag coordinators elected the party President, Vice Presidents, Executive Committee Members, General Secretary, Treasurer, and other office bearers.

After submitting all required documents to the Election Commission of Bhutan, BTP received approval for registration on 9 January 2023.

Soon after its registration with the ECB, BTP began its familiarization tour across the country. The party held its first General Assembly in Thimphu on 30 January 2023.

== Tendrel ==
Tendrel refers to the natural law of interdependence, dependent origination, or the law of cause and effect, as well as conveys auspiciousness, virtue, wellness, and harmony. It unifies and strengthens positive energy, marking the way forward for a good cause. The BTP emphasizes that Tendrel signifies the dawn of a new era, heralding a bold and prosperous Bhutan.

== Party symbol ==
The symbol of the BTP is an elephant, chosen to represent strength, character, stability, and power. Elephants are revered for embodying wisdom, memory, and intelligence accumulated over generations.

== President ==
The President of the Bhutan Tendrel Party is Pema Chewang. He previously served as the secretary of the National Land Commission and has a 32-year tenure in the civil service. Chewang holds a Master's degree in Development Economics from the Australian National University.

== Candidates ==
Supporters of the party assert that they have a diverse array of highly capable and competent candidates, spanning various educational backgrounds, experiences, and ages.

=== 2023 election candidates ===
The party unveiled its candidates for the 2023 elections shortly after its establishment.

No	Candidate	Constituency	Dzongkhag
1	Pema Chewang	Kanglung-Udzorong-Samkhar	Trashigang
2	Dorji Cheten	Panbang	Zhemgang
3	Pema Tenzin	Bongo-Chhapcha	Chukha
4	Ugyen Dem	Khatoed-Laya	Gasa
5	Ritu Raj Chhetri	Tashichhoeling	Samtse
6	Rinchen Wangdi	Bartsham-Shongphu	Trashigang
7	Ngawang Tobgay	Sombaykha	Haa
8	Naiten Wangchuk	Mongar	Mongar
9	Sonam M Penjor	North Thimphu	Thimphu
10	Wangdi	Boomdeling-Jamkhar	Trashiyangtse
11	Dr. Gyambo Sithey	Lingmukha-Toedwang	Punakha
12	Tshering Dorji	Kabisa-Talog	Punakha
13	Lam Dorji	Wamrong	Trashigang
14	Tshering Penjor	Dewathang-Gomdar	Samdrup Jongkhar
15	Karma Rinchen	Gelephu	Sarpang
16	Pushpa Raj Humagai	Ugyentse-Yoeseltse	Samtse
17	Passang Dorji	Phuentshogpelri	Samtse
18	Dhan Bahadur Tamang	Kilkhorthang-Mendrelgang	Tsirang
19	Lamdra Wangdi	Nganglam	Pema Gatshel
20	Damche Tenzin	Thrimshing	Trashigang
21	Prakash Sharma	Lhamoidzingkha-Tashiding	Dagana
22	Maita Raj Rai	Phuentshogling	Chhukha
23	Deepak Sunwar	Dophuchen-Tading	Samtse
24	Chhabi Lal Das	Sergithang-Tsirang Toed	Tsirang
25	Lachuman Ghalley	Shompangkha	Sarpang
26	Tshering Dorji	Bji-Kartshog-Uesu	Haa
27	Tempa Dorji	Maenbi-Tshenkhar	Lhuentse
28	Dorji Wangmo	Kengkhar-Werringla	Mongar
29	Tashi Dorji	Nubi-Tangsbji	Trongsa
30	Dorji	Dragteng-Langthil	Trongsa
31	Tashi Tenzin	Radhi-sagteng	Trashigang
32	Namgay Dorji	Khamdang-Ramjar	Trashiyangtse
33	Pema Dakpa	Bardo-Trong	Zhemgang
34	Nima Tshering	Drukjeygang-Tseza	Dagana
35	Dhendup	Khamaed-Lunana	Gasa
36	Karma Dorji	Nyishog-Saephu	Wangduephodrang
37	Jigme	Dokar-Sharpa	Paro
38	Tshering Lhadon	Chhumig-Ura	Bumthang
39	Yeshey Jamtsho	Nanong-Shumar	Pemagatshel
40	Jigme Wangchuk	Jomotshangkha-Martshala	Samdrupjongkhar
41	Ugyen	Athang-Thedtsho	Wangduephodrang
42	Kinzang Wangchuk	Dramedtse-Ngatshang	Mongar

== Election results ==
=== National Assembly ===
Election	First round		Second round		Seats	+/–	Outcome
Election	Votes	%	Votes	%	Seats	+/–	Outcome
2023–24	61,331	19.58%	147,123	45.02%	17 / 47	New	Opposition
