= Indian Society of International Law =

Law society in India

The Indian Society of International Law (ISIL) is an institution for the teaching, research and promotion of International Law in India. It is located opposite the Supreme Court of India and next to the Indian Law Institute (ILI). The ISIL was established due to the efforts of V.K. Krishna Menon and was inaugurated by Prime Minister Jawahar Lal Nehru, who served as Patron of the society. It held its inaugural meeting on August 29, 1959. It set out as its objectives:

to foster nation-wide the study and development of international law; establish the Indian Institute of International Law; interpret through its forums and publications the application of international law chiefly as affecting India; encourage the comparative study of the application of international law in other states; promote research in international law; organize regional branches of the Society and maintain libraries; and for these purposes to co-operate with similar societies in India and in other countries.

The Indian Society of International Law has been notified as an approved organisation u/s 35(1)(iii) of the Income Tax Act, 1961 vide Notification No. 22 [F.NO.203/43/2010/ITA-II], Dated 28-04-2011.
