= Druk Chirwang Tshogpa =

Druk Chirwang Tshogpa འབྲུག་སྤྱིར་དབང་ཚོགས་པ།
- Leader: Lily Wangchuk
- President: Lily Wangchuk
- Founded: January 20, 2013
- Dissolved: February 26, 2018
- Merged into: Druk Phuensum Tshogpa
- Headquarters: Thimphu, Bhutan
- Ideology: Social democracy Democratic socialism
- Political position: Centre-left

Website
- http://www.dct.bt/

The Druk Chirwang Tshogpa (Dzongkha: འབྲུག་སྤྱིར་དབང་ཚོགས་པ།; Wylie: ’brug spyir-dbang tshogs-pa, DCT; English: Bhutan Commoner's Party or Party of the Common People of Bhutan) was a Bhutanese political party. It was registered on January 7, 2013. In the primary round of the 2nd National Assembly elections held in 2013, the DCT had 12,457 votes and came fourth place, not winning in any constituency, and so could not take part in the final round. The Election Commission of Bhutan announced on February 26, 2018, that the Party was being deregistered on its own request. The party then merged with Druk Phuensum Tshogpa.

== See also ==
- List of political parties in Bhutan
- 2013 Bhutanese National Assembly election
