= Yeshey Zimba =

4th Prime Minister of Bhutan

Dasho Yeshey Zimba
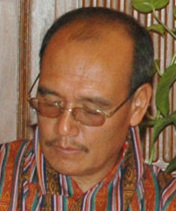
- Zimba in 2006

4th Prime Minister of Bhutan
- In office 20 August 2004 – 4 September 2005
- Monarch: Jigme Singye Wangchuck
- Preceded by: Jigme Thinley
- Succeeded by: Sangay Ngedup
- In office 20 July 2000 – 9 August 2001
- Monarch: Jigme Singye Wangchuck
- Preceded by: Sangay Ngedup
- Succeeded by: Khandu Wangchuk

Personal details
- Born: 10 October 1950
- Died: 9 September 2024 (aged 73)
- Party: Druk Phuensum Tshogpa
- Spouse: Aum Thuji Zam

Lyonpo Yeshey Zimba (Dzongkha: ཡེ་ཤེས་སྦྱིན་པ, Wylie: ye-shes sbyin-pa, 10 October 1950 – 9 September 2024) was a political figure from Bhutan. He was Prime Minister (Chairman of the Council of Ministers) of Bhutan two times: first from 2000 to 2001; then from 20 August 2004 to 5 September 2005. During this period, each minister took turns holding the chairmanship for one year.

== Early life ==
He completed his high school in North Point School and got his bachelor's degree from St. Joseph's College, Darjeeling, an affiliate of the University of North Bengal. Yeshey later graduated with an MA in economics from the University of Wisconsin–Madison in 1976.

== Career ==
He was the managing director of Royal Monetary Authority of Bhutan from 1983 to 1986, and the chairman from 1998 to 2002. He was Minister of Finance from August 1998 to July 2003.

Zimba served as Minister of Trade and Industry until resigning in mid-2007 to participate in the March 2008 general election. Following the election, he became Minister of Works and Human Settlement on 11 April 2008. He served in this position until 2013, and then from 2013 to 2018 was a Member of Parliament in the Parliament of Bhutan. His specific constituency that he served in was South Thimphu Constituency. He was also chairman of the board called the Empowered Group that set up the Education City project site, which later became the Bhutan Education City Board after the passing of the Education City Bill.

== Personal life ==
Zimba was a devout Buddhist, visiting numerous religious sites in Bhutan. He was married to Thuji Zam, who owned an apple orchard land near the Education City site in Selekha. Zimba died on the morning of 9 September 2024 after a period of time with an illness.

Political offices
Preceded by Sangay Ngedup	Prime Minister of Bhutan; 2000–2001	Succeeded by Khandu Wangchuk
Preceded by Jigme Thinley	Prime Minister of Bhutan; 2004–2005	Succeeded by Sangay Ngedup
