= Talog Gewog =

Talog Gewog རྟ་ལོག་
- Gewog
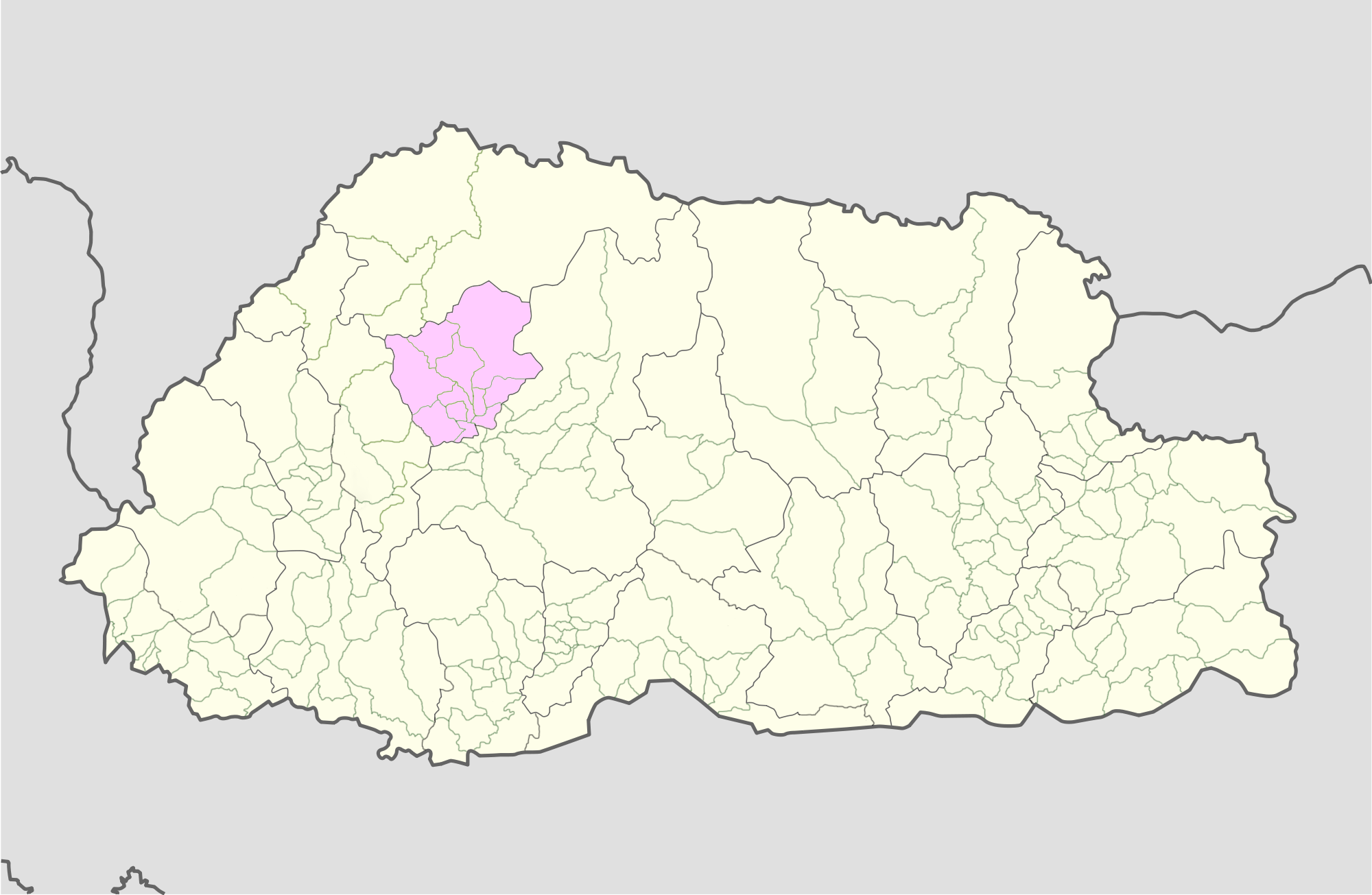
- Coordinates: 27°33′33″N 89°49′8″E
- Country: Bhutan
- District: Punakha District

Area
  - Total: 25.51 km^{2} (9.85 sq mi)

Population (2017)
  - Total: 1,205
- Time zone: UTC+6 (BTT)

Talog Gewog (Dzongkha: རྟ་ལོག་རྒེད་འོག) is a gewog in Punakha District (dzongkhag), Bhutan. Spread over an area of 25.51 km^{2} (9.85 sq mi), it had a population of 1,205 in 2017.

== Geography ==
Talog Gewog is one of the eleven gewogs in Punakha District (dzongkhag), Bhutan. Spread over an area of 25.51 km^{2} (9.85 sq mi), it is one of the smallest gewogs by land area in the district. It is located in the southcentral part of the district and is bordered by Toepisa Gewog to the southwest, Barp Gewog to the south, and Guma Gewog to the northeast.

The gewog is located at an altitude ranging from 1,300 to 1,500 m (4,300 to 4,900 ft). It is located in the subtropical climate zone and experiences hot and humid summers and cold winters. Approximately 45% of the land area of the gewog is covered by broad-leaf forests and 35% by coniferous forests. Of the remaining land, 15% is designated as agricultural lands and the rest are made up of grazing and shrub lands.

The gewog is divided into five chiwogs–Loongnangkha, Norbugang, Dongkokhar-Yonggu, Talog and Gangthramo-Labtsakha-Soelwdrangsa. The chiwogs are further subdivided into 24 villages.

== Demographics and economy ==
According to the 2017 Population and Housing Census of Bhutan, Talog Gewog had a population of 1,205, comprising 628 males and 577 females. The gewog had 348 households, with an average household size of 3.2 people. Approximately 98% of the household had access to clean drinking water.

Rice, wheat, and mustard are the major crops, apart from vegetables including potato, beans, raddish, pea, and tomato. Oat and fodder grass are also grown in the gewog. In 2021, the Government of Bhutan renovated the Phendey Yuwa irrigation scheme, funded by the Green Climate Fund and supported by the United Nations Development Programme, which benefited agriculture in the gewog.

The gewog also has one renewable natural resources centre, one basic health unit, one outreach clinic, two primary schools, one multipurpose hall and community centre. The gewog has eight lhakhangs.
