= List of prime ministers of Bhutan =

Prime Minister of Bhutan
- བློན་ཆེན (Dzongkha)
- Emblem of Bhutan

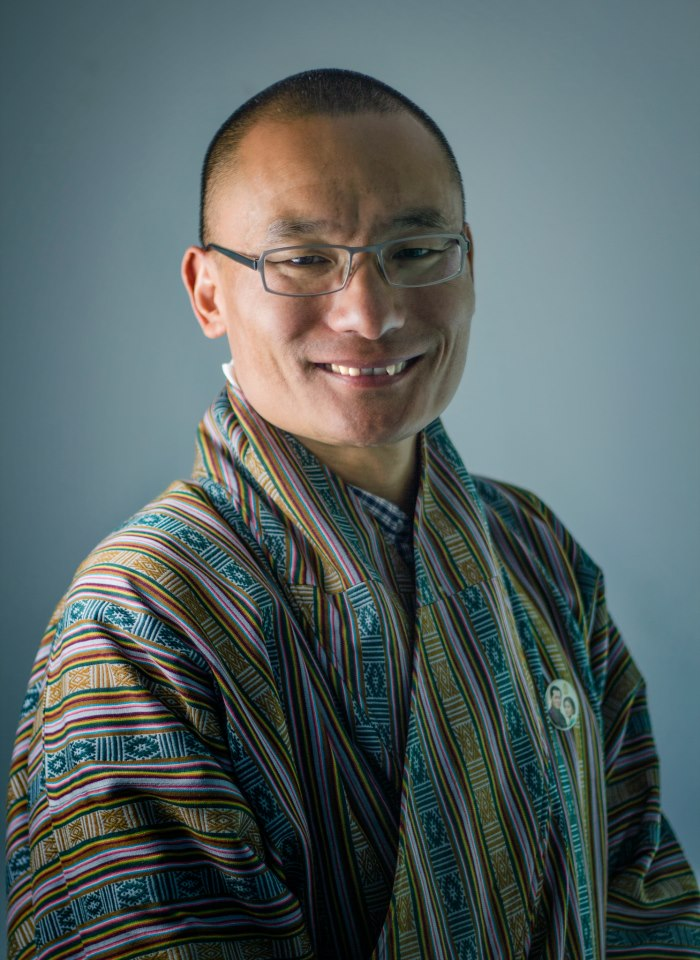
- Incumbent; Tshering Tobgay since 28 January 2024
- Type: Head of government
- Member of: National Assembly; Council of Ministers
- Appointer: King of Bhutan
- Term length: Four years, renewable once
- Formation: 1907 (Chief Minister); 1952 (Prime Minister)
- First holder: Ugyen Dorji (Chief Minister); Jigme Palden Dorji (Prime Minister)
- Salary: Nu. 3,053,094 / US$37,365 annually (2015)

The prime minister of Bhutan (Dzongkha: བློན་ཆེན, romanized: Lyonchen) is the head of government of Bhutan. The prime minister is nominated by the party that wins the most seats in the National Assembly and heads the executive cabinet, called the Council of Ministers.

On 9 April 2008, Jigme Thinley became the first elected prime minister; he took office following the country's first democratic election.

The current prime minister is Tshering Tobgay, since 28 January 2024.

== Prime ministers of the Kingdom of Bhutan ==
=== Chief ministers (Gongzim) ===
No.	Portrait	Name (Birth–Death)	Term of office			King (Reign)	Ref.
No.	Portrait	Name (Birth–Death)	Took office	Left office	Time in office	King (Reign)	Ref.
1		Raja; Ugyen Dorji (1855–1916)	1907	22 June 1916 #	c. 8–9 years	Ugyen (1907–1926)	
2		Raja; Sonam Topgay Dorji (1896–1953)	1917	1952	c. 34–35 years	Ugyen (1907–1926)	
2		Raja; Sonam Topgay Dorji (1896–1953)	1917	1952	c. 34–35 years	Jigme (1926–1952)	

=== Prime ministers (Lyonchen) ===
No.	Portrait	Name (Birth–Death)	Term of office			Political party	Elected	Cabinet(s)	King (Reign)	Ref.
No.	Portrait	Name (Birth–Death)	Took office	Left office	Time in office	Political party	Elected	Cabinet(s)	King (Reign)	Ref.
1		Jigme Palden Dorji (1919–1964)	1952	6 April 1964 X (Note: Killed by a corporal of the Royal Bhutan Army.)	c. 11–12 years	Independent	—N/a	—	Jigme Dorji (1952–1972)	
Vacant (6 April 1964 – 25 July 1964)									Jigme Dorji (1952–1972)	
—		Lhendup Dorji (Note: Brother of Jigme Palden Dorji.) (1935–2007) acting	25 July 1964	27 November 1964	125 days	Independent	—N/a	—	Jigme Dorji (1952–1972)	
Post Abolished (27 November 1964 – 20 July 1998)
2		Jigme Thinley (born 1952); 1st time	20 July 1998	9 July 1999	354 days	Independent	—N/a	—	Jigme Singye (1972–2006)	
3		Sangay Ngedup (born 1953); 1st time	9 July 1999	20 July 2000	1 year, 11 days	Independent	—N/a	—	Jigme Singye (1972–2006)	
4		Yeshey Zimba (1950–2024); 1st time	20 July 2000	8 August 2001	1 year, 19 days	Independent	—N/a	—	Jigme Singye (1972–2006)	
5		Khandu Wangchuk (born 1950); 1st time	8 August 2001	14 August 2002	1 year, 6 days	Independent	—N/a	—	Jigme Singye (1972–2006)	
6		Kinzang Dorji (born 1951); 1st time	14 August 2002	30 August 2003	1 year, 16 days	Independent	—N/a	—	Jigme Singye (1972–2006)	
(2)		Jigme Thinley (born 1952); 2nd time	30 August 2003	18 August 2004	354 days	Independent	—N/a	—	Jigme Singye (1972–2006)	
(4)		Yeshey Zimba (1950–2024); 2nd time	18 August 2004	5 September 2005	1 year, 18 days	Independent	—N/a	—	Jigme Singye (1972–2006)	
(3)		Sangay Ngedup (born 1953); 2nd time	5 September 2005	7 September 2006	1 year, 2 days	Independent	—N/a	—	Jigme Singye (1972–2006)	
(5)		Khandu Wangchuk (born 1950); 2nd time	7 September 2006	31 July 2007	327 days	Independent	—N/a	—	Jigme Singye (1972–2006)	
(5)		Khandu Wangchuk (born 1950); 2nd time	7 September 2006	31 July 2007	327 days	Independent	—N/a	—	Jigme Khesar Namgyel (2006–present)	
(6)		Kinzang Dorji (born 1951); 2nd time	31 July 2007	9 April 2008	253 days	Independent	—N/a	—	Jigme Khesar Namgyel (2006–present)	
Democratically elected									Jigme Khesar Namgyel (2006–present)	
(2)		Jigme Thinley (born 1952); 3rd time	9 April 2008	28 April 2013	5 years, 19 days	DPT	2008	Thinley	Jigme Khesar Namgyel (2006–present)	
—		Sonam Tobgye (born 1949); Chief Advisor	28 April 2013	27 July 2013	90 days	Independent	—	Tobgye Interim	Jigme Khesar Namgyel (2006–present)	
7		Tshering Tobgay (born 1965); 1st time	27 July 2013	9 August 2018	5 years, 13 days	PDP	2013	Tobgay I	Jigme Khesar Namgyel (2006–present)	
—		Tshering Wangchuk (born 19??); Chief Advisor	9 August 2018	7 November 2018	90 days	Independent	—	Wangchuk Interim	Jigme Khesar Namgyel (2006–present)	
8		Lotay Tshering (born 1969)	7 November 2018	1 November 2023	4 years, 359 days	DNT	2013	Tshering	Jigme Khesar Namgyel (2006–present)	
—		Chogyal Dago Rigdzin (born 19??); Chief Advisor	1 November 2023	28 January 2024	88 days	Independent	—	Rigdzin Interim	Jigme Khesar Namgyel (2006–present)	
(7)		Tshering Tobgay (born 1965); 2nd time	28 January 2024	Incumbent	2 years, 285 days	PDP	2023–24	Tobgay II	Jigme Khesar Namgyel (2006–present)	

== See also ==
- List of rulers of Bhutan
