= Bhutan National Party =

Political party of Bhutan

The Bhutan National Party is a former Bhutanese unregistered political party formed to contest the Himalayan nation's 2008 general election. The party was an alliance of former civil servants, defense officials and businessmen.

As an Asia Sentinel journalist noted:

We definitely need at least three reliable political parties, otherwise the country may be in a situation where voters will have to choose one of the two worst candidates.
