= Jigme Thinley =

2nd Prime Minister of Bhutan

- འཇིགས་མེད་འོད་ཟེར་འཕྲིན་ལས
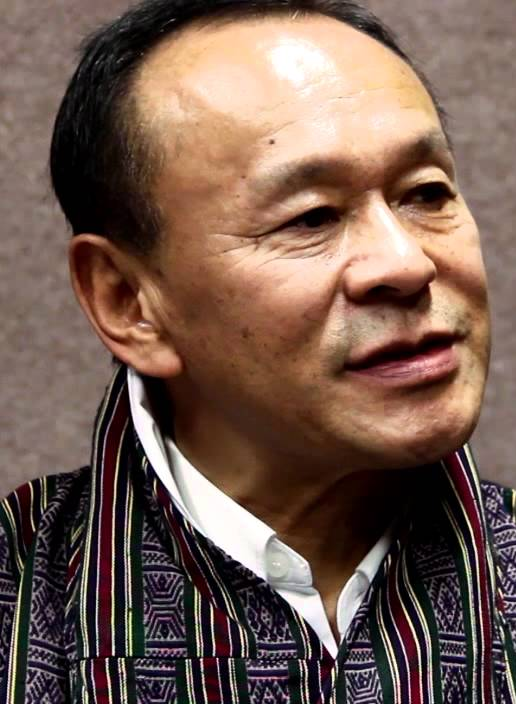
- Thinley in 2012

2nd Prime Minister of Bhutan
- In office 9 April 2008 – 28 April 2013
- Monarch: Jigme Khesar Namgyel Wangchuck
- Preceded by: Kinzang Dorji
- Succeeded by: Sonam Tobgye (as Chief Advisor)
- In office 30 August 2003 – 18 August 2004
- Monarch: Jigme Singye Wangchuck
- Preceded by: Khandu Wangchuk
- Succeeded by: Yeshey Zimba
- In office 20 July 1998 – 9 July 1999
- Monarch: Jigme Singye Wangchuck
- Preceded by: Jigme Palden Dorji
- Succeeded by: Sangay Ngedup

Personal details
- Born: 9 September 1952 (age 74) Bumthang, Bhutan
- Party: Peace and Prosperity Party
- Other political affiliations: Independent (before 2007)
- Spouse: Aum Rinsy Dem (died 2018)
- Children: 3
- Education: Pennsylvania State University; St. Stephen's College, Delhi

Lyonpo Jigme Yoser Thinley (Dzongkha: འཇིགས་མེད་འོད་ཟེར་འཕྲིན་ལས, Wylie: Jigs-med 'Od-zer 'Phrin-las; born 9 September 1952) is a Bhutanese politician who served as Prime Minister of Bhutan for three nonconsecutive terms, from 20 July 1998 to 9 July 1999, 30 August 2003 to 18 August 2004 and 9 April 2008 to 28 April 2013.

== Biography ==
Thinley was born in Bumthang and joined the civil service in 1976 upon receiving a graduate degree from The Pennsylvania State University. He received an undergraduate degree from St. Stephen's College, Delhi.

In February 1987, Thinley was awarded the title of Dasho and the Red Scarf, and in 1990, under the zonal system, he became administrator of the Eastern Zone. He then became secretary in the Ministry of Home Affairs in 1992 before being appointed Deputy Minister of Home Affairs in January 1994, at which time he was also awarded the Orange Scarf. Later in 1994, he was appointed Bhutan's Permanent Representative to the United Nations office and other international organizations in Geneva.

Prior to the beginning of Bhutanese democracy, he was Prime Minister twice, from 20 July 1998 to 9 July 1999, and from 30 August 2003 to 20 August 2004. During this period, chairmanship of the council was based on rotation once per year, with the order of rotation decided by the number of votes secured during the time of election to the council. Jigme was also the Minister of Foreign Affairs of Bhutan from 1998 until 2003 and subsequently served as Minister of Home and Cultural Affairs.

In March 2008, he stood as leader of the political party Druk Phuensum Tshogpa in Bhutan's first democratic election. His party won 45 of the 47 seats in the National Assembly of Bhutan, which enabled Jigme Thinley to become Bhutan's first ever elected Prime Minister. He took office on 9 April.

Thinley blamed the global economic crisis of 2008–2009 on "insatiable human greed" and stressed the need to instead focus on the Bhutanese notion of gross national happiness. His government works to base its policies on gross national happiness rather than purely economic considerations.

In July 2009, Thinley became a member of the SNV Netherlands Development Organisation's International Advisory Board.

== Personal life ==
His son Palden married Princess Ashi Kesang Choden Wangchuck on 11 November 2008.

His wife Aum Rinsy Dem died in Bangkok on 28 November 2018.

He has honorary doctorates from KIIT University and University of Louvain (UCLouvain).

== Honours ==
He has honorary doctorates from KIIT University and University of Louvain (UCLouvain).

Political offices
Preceded by Lhendup Dorji	Prime Minister of Bhutan; 1998–1999	Succeeded by Sangay Ngedup
Preceded by Dawa Tsering	Minister of Foreign Affairs; 1998–2003	Succeeded by Khandu Wangchuk
Preceded by Kinzang Dorji	Prime Minister of Bhutan; 2003–2004	Succeeded by Yeshey Zimba
Preceded by Kinzang Dorji	Prime Minister of Bhutan; 2008–2013	Succeeded by Sonam Tobgye as Chief Advisor
Diplomatic posts
Preceded by Mahinda Rajapaksa	Chairperson of SAARC; 2010	Succeeded by Mohammed Nasheed
