= 2008 Bhutanese National Assembly election =

- 24 March 2008

All 47 seats in the National Assembly 24 seats needed for a majority
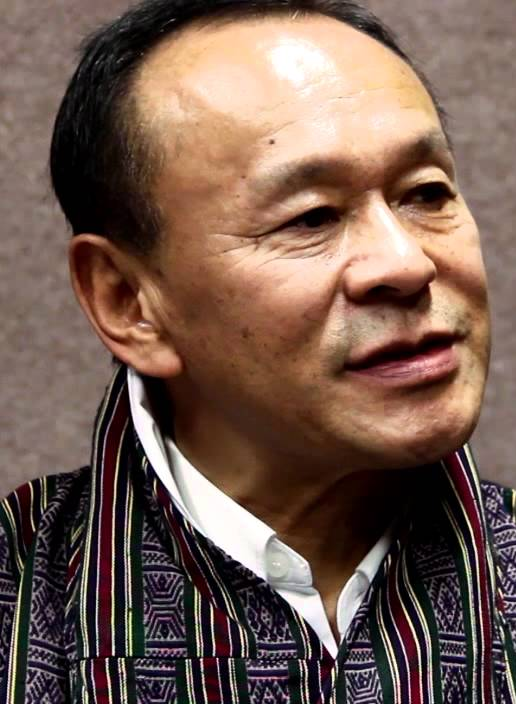

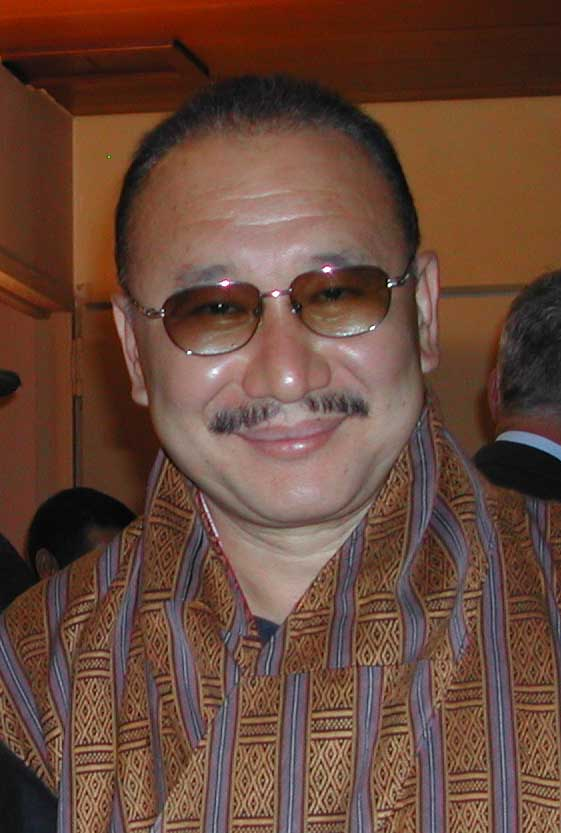
	First party	Second party
Leader	Jigme Thinley	Sangay Ngedup
Party	DPT	PDP
Seats won	45	2
Popular vote	169,490	83,322
Percentage	67.04%	32.96%
- Results by constituency
Prime Minister before election
Kinzang Dorji
Independent
Prime Minister-designate
Jigme Thinley
DPT

National Assembly elections were held in Bhutan for the first time on 24 March 2008. Two parties were registered by the Election Commission of Bhutan to contest the elections; Druk Phuensum Tshogpa (DPT), led by Jigme Y. Thinley, which was formed by the merger of the Bhutan People's United Party and All People's Party, and the People's Democratic Party (PDP). A third political party, the Bhutan National Party (BNP), had its application for the registration refused.

== Electoral system ==
Parties which wished to compete in the election had to attain official status and satisfy a range of conditions, for example supporting the 'national interest'. Candidates for any party had to be a citizen, registered to vote in the constituency, hold at least a bachelor's degree, be between the ages of 25 and 65, not working for the civil service and not be in receipt of foreign assistance.

The elections for the 47 seats of the National Assembly were planned to be held in two rounds: In the first 'primary' round, voters chose for a party. The two parties with the largest share of the national vote would then have been able to field candidates in the 47 constituencies in the 'general election' round. However, as only two parties had successfully registered for the election, the election was held in one general election round.

== Background ==
=== Paro College mock election ===
The Electoral Commission first experimented with elections with a mock election at the Paro College of Education. This involved the college's faculty and students as candidates and voters. The first round was conducted on 8 September 2006, and the second round was conducted on 9 September. 620 voters in 2 polling stations voted for one of six 'dummy' political parties using electronic voting machines.

In the first round, turnout was 96%, and it was 87% in the second round. The two parties which proceeded to the second round were the Bhutan Forward Party, and the Druk Unity Party.

Party	Primary round		General round	
Party	Votes	%	Votes	%
Bhutan Forward	245	41.39	295	54.43
Druk Unity	93	15.71	247	45.57
National Freedom	76	12.84		
Druk Socialist Party	75	12.67		
Bhutan Democratic Party	62	10.47		
Druk Yarphel Party	41	6.93		
Total	592	100.00	542	100.00
Registered voters/turnout	620	–	620	–
Source: ECB

=== National mock election ===
On 21 April 2007 a mock election was held to prepare the population of Bhutan for the imminent change to democracy. These elections were held in all 47 National Assembly constituencies and at 869 polling stations with around 1,000 voters at each one of them. The parties "contesting" the election were the Druk Blue Party, the Druk Green Party, the Druk Red Party and the Druk Yellow Party (with Druk being Dzongkha for "thunder dragon", a national symbol of Bhutan). Each "party" represented certain values as their "party manifesto": yellow for traditional values, red for industrial development, blue for fairness and accountability, and green for the environment. The two parties winning the most votes were to proceed to a run-off election scheduled for 28 May.

Election observers were present from the United Nations and from India.

The results of the first round saw the Druk Yellow Party receive a plurality of the vote. The Druk Yellow and Druk Red parties proceeded to the second, or general, round. These two parties put up randomly chosen high school students as candidates in the 47 constituencies in the second round on 28 May 2007. The Druk Yellow Party swept the vote and won 46 of the 47 constituencies, with the Druk Red Party winning the Bartsham-Shongphu constituency. Turnout in the second round was 66%.

246,146 people had registered to vote, though it is considered likely that a total of 400,000 would have been eligible to register as voters.

Party	Primary round		General round		Seats
Party	Votes	%	Votes	%	Seats
Druk Yellow Party	56,531	44.75	161,986	74.96	46
Druk Red Party	25,542	20.22	54,117	25.04	1
Druk Blue Party	25,508	20.19			0
Druk Green Party	18,757	14.85			0
Total	126,338	100.00	216,103	100.00	47
Registered voters/turnout	246,146	–	246,146	–	
Source: ECB

=== 2007–2008 National Council election ===
Between December 2007 and January 2008, the first official elections were held for the National Council. This was found by international observers to have 'met international standards' for elections. Some of the constituencies had no candidates, leading to a delay in the date.

== Schedule ==
The election procedure began with the submission of the letters of intent, lists of candidates, copies of election manifestos and audited financial statements by the two political parties contesting the elections to the election commission followed by the release of the party manifestos by them on 22 January 2008.

From 31 January to 7 February 2008 both political parties submitted the nomination papers for their candidates for the 47 constituencies. The candidates, whose nominations were accepted, started campaigning in their constituencies from 7 February. The election campaign ended at 9:00 on 22 March. The last date for receiving the postal ballots was 18 February. The elections were held on 24 March from 09:00 to 17:00 followed by the counting of ballots on the same day. The results were declared on 25 March.

All eligible voters were allowed to register with the election commission until 20 February 2008 for the inclusion of their names in the voters list which was updated to include those eligible voters who were eighteen years old on or before 1 January 2008. The final electoral roll was published on 5 March 2008.

== Campaign ==
Only two parties competed in the election, the DPT and PDP, and a close race between the two was expected.

There were few differences between the platforms of the two parties and both pledged to follow the king's guidelines of "pursuing Gross National Happiness". Both party leaders had also previously served in governments.

== Results ==
Voter turnout reached nearly 80% by the time the polls closed, and the Bhutan Peace and Prosperity Party reportedly won 44 seats, with the People's Democratic Party winning only three seats (Phuentsholing in Chhukha, Goenkhatoe-Laya in Gasa and Sombeykha in Haa). The PDP's leader, Sangay Ngedup, who was also the ruling king's uncle, lost his own constituency by 380 votes. However, due to a mistake in tallying the votes in Phuntsholing, the DPT had actually won 45 seats and the PDP only 2.

The DPT's large-scale victory may have been due to it being perceived as the more royalist of the two parties.

Party	Votes	%	Seats
Druk Phuensum Tshogpa	169,490	67.04	45
People's Democratic Party	83,322	32.96	2
Total	252,812	100.00	47
Total votes	252,812	–	
Registered voters/turnout	318,465	79.38	
Source: Election Commission of Bhutan, EUEOM

== Aftermath ==
The two PDP members who were elected refused to take up their seats and resigned their mandates, claiming that the civil servants informally campaigned for the DPT and influenced the result.

The DPT officially approved its leader as candidate for Prime Minister on 5 April 2008. He took office on 9 April.

Although analysts were worried that the small representation of the opposition might obstruct the functioning of the newly founded democratic system, the next elections in 2013 were won by the PDP.
