= Gross National Happiness =

Guiding philosophy of the government of Bhutan

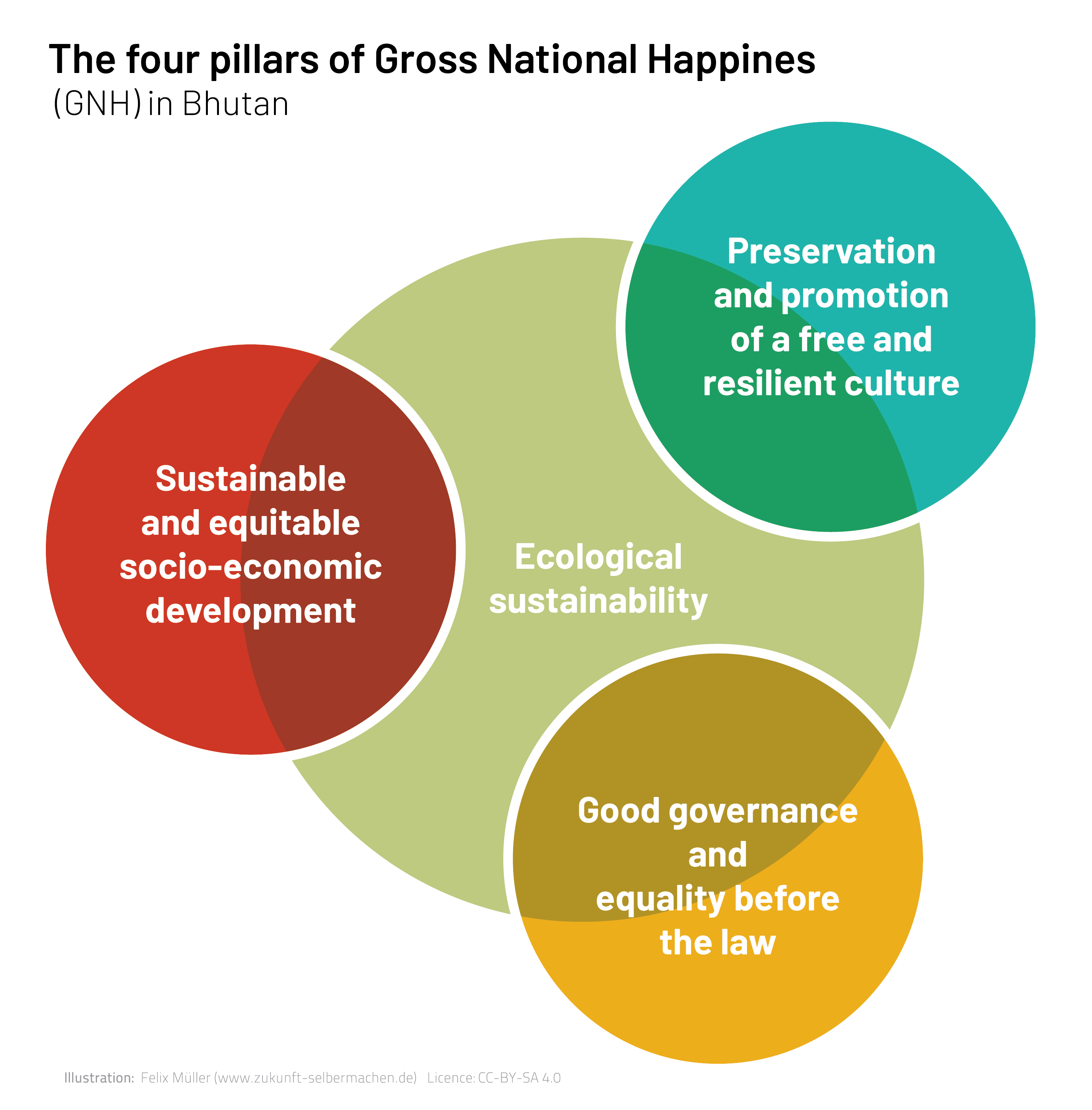
Four pillars of Gross National Happiness (GNH) in Bhutan

Gross National Happiness, (GNH; Dzongkha: རྒྱལ་ཡོངས་དགའ་སྐྱིད་དཔལ་འཛོམས།) sometimes called Gross Domestic Happiness (GDH), is a philosophy that the government of Bhutan follows. It includes an index for measuring a population's collective happiness and well-being. The Gross National Happiness Index was instituted as the goal of the government of Bhutan in the Constitution of Bhutan, enacted on 18 July 2008.

== History ==
The concept of "Gross National Happiness" (GNH) was invented by the 4th King of Bhutan, Jigme Singye Wangchuck, building on "Gaki Phuensum" (Peace and Prosperity) and the modernization period of Bhutan during the reign of Druk Gyelpo, the 3rd King of Bhutan, Jigme Dorji Wangchuck.

The term "Gross National Happiness" as conceptualized by the 4th King of Bhutan, Jigme Singye Wangchuck, in 1972 was declared, "more important than Gross Domestic Product." The concept implies that sustainable development should take a holistic approach towards notions of progress and give equal importance to non-economic aspects of wellbeing. When defining Gross National Happiness (GNH), the king drew inspiration from Bhutan’s long-standing tradition of compassion and non-violence toward all living beings, rooted in its 1,200-year Buddhist heritage.

In 2011, the UN General Assembly passed resolution 65/309, "Happiness: towards a holistic approach to development", urging member nations to follow the example of Bhutan and measure happiness and well-being and calling happiness a "fundamental human goal."

In 2012, Bhutan's Prime Minister Jigme Y Thinley and the Secretary-General Ban Ki-moon of the United Nations convened the High-Level Meeting: Well-being and Happiness: Defining a New Economic Paradigm to encourage the spread of Bhutan's GNH philosophy. At the meeting, the first World Happiness Report was issued. Shortly afterward, 20 March was declared to be the International Day of Happiness by the UN in 2012 with resolution 66/28.

Bhutan's Prime Minister Tshering Tobgay proclaimed a preference for focusing on more concrete goals instead of promoting GNH when he took office in 2013, but subsequently has protected the GNH of his country and promoted the concept internationally. Other Bhutanese officials also promote the spread of GNH at the UN and internationally.

== Definition ==
GNH is distinguishable from Gross Domestic Product by attempting to be a more direct measure of collective happiness through emphasizing harmony with nature and select cultural values, as expressed in the 9 domains of happiness and 4 pillars of GNH. According to the Bhutanese government, the four pillars of GNH are:

1. sustainable and equitable socio-economic development;
2. environmental conservation;
3. preservation and promotion of culture; and
4. good governance.

The nine domains of GNH are:

1. psychological well-being
2. health
3. time use
4. education
5. cultural diversity and resilience
6. good governance
7. community vitality
8. ecological diversity and resilience
9. living standards

Each domain is composed of subjective (survey-based) and objective indicators. The domains weigh equally but the indicators within each domain differ by weight.

Individuals are then classified by their scores on the indicators, and reported as happy (deeply happy or extensively happy) or not-yet-happy (narrowly happy or unhappy).

Political scientist Kent Schroeder notes that "the values underlying the individual pillars of GNH are defined as distinctly Buddhist," and "GNH constructs Buddhism as the core of the cultural values of the country (of Bhutan). They provide the foundation upon which the GNH rests." GNH is thus seen as part of the Buddhist Middle Way, where "happiness is accrued from a balanced act rather than from an extreme approach."

== Implementation in Bhutan ==
The body charged with implementing GNH in Bhutan is the Gross National Happiness Commission. The GNH Commission is composed of the Prime Minister as the Chairperson, Secretaries of each of the ministries of the government, and the Secretary of the GNH Commission. The GNH Commission's tasks include conceiving and also implementing the nation's 5-year plan and promulgating policies. The GNH Index is used to measure the happiness and well-being of Bhutan's population. A GNH Policy Screening Tool and a GNH Project Screening Tool is used by the GNH commission to determine whether to pass policies or implement projects. The GNH Screening tools are used by the Bhutanese GNH Commission for anticipating the impact of policy initiatives upon the levels of GNH in Bhutan.

In 2008, the first Bhutanese GNH survey was conducted. It was followed by a second one in 2010. The third nationwide survey was conducted in 2015. The GNH survey covers all twenty districts (Dzonkhag) and results are reported for varying demographic factors such as gender, age, abode, and occupation. The first GNH surveys consisted of long questionnaires that polled the citizens about living conditions and religious behavior, including questions about the times a person prayed in a day and other karma indicators. It took several hours to complete one questionnaire. Later rounds of the GNH Index were shortened, but the survey retained the religious behavioral indicators.

The Bhutan GNH Index was developed by the Centre for Bhutan Studies with the help of Oxford University researchers to help measure the progress of Bhutanese society. The Index's function was based on the Alkire & Foster method of 2011. After the creation of the GNH Index, the government used the metric to measure national progress and inform policy.

The Bhutan GNH Index is considered by progressive scholars to measure societal progress similarly to other models such as the OECD Better Life Index of 2011, and SPI Social Progress Index of 2013. One feature distinguishing Bhutan's GNH Index from the other models is that the other models are designed for secular governments and do not include religious behavior measurement components.

The data is used to compare happiness among different groups of citizens, and changes over time.

According to the World Happiness Report 2019, Bhutan is 95th out of 156 countries.

The holistic consideration of multiple factors through the GNH approach has been cited as impacting Bhutan's response to the COVID-19 pandemic.

== Dissemination ==
In Victoria, British Columbia, Canada, a shortened version of Bhutan's GNH survey was used by the local government, local foundations and governmental agencies under the leadership of Martha and Michael Pennock to assess the population of Victoria.

In the state of São Paulo, Brazil, Susan Andrews, through her organization Future Vision Ecological Park, used a version of Bhutan's GNH at a community level in some cities.

In Seattle, Washington, United States, a version of the GNH Index was used by the Seattle City Council and Sustainable Seattle to assess the happiness and well-being of the Seattle Area population. Other cities and areas in North America, including Eau Claire, Wisconsin, Creston, British Columbia and the U.S. state of Vermont, also used a version of the GNH Index.

The state of Vermont's Governor declared April 13 (President Jefferson's birthday) "Pursuit of Happiness Day", and became the first state to pass legislation enabling development of alternative indicators and to assist in making policy. The University of Vermont Center for Rural Studies Vermont perform a periodic study of well-being in the state.

At the University of Oregon, United States, a behavioral model of GNH based on the use of positive and negative words in social network status updates was developed by Adam Kramer.

In 2016, Thailand launched its own GNH center. The former king of Thailand, Bhumibol Adulyadej, was a close friend of King Jigme Singye Wangchuck, and conceived the similar philosophy of sufficiency economy.

In the Philippines, the concept of GNH has been lauded by various personalities, notably Philippine senator and UN Global Champion for Resilience Loren Legarda, and former environment minister Gina Lopez. Bills have been filed in the Philippine Senate and House of Representatives in support of Gross National Happiness in the Philippines. Additionally, Executive Director of Bhutan's GNH Center, Dr. Saamdu Chetri, has been invited by high-level officials in the Philippines for a GNH Forum.

Many other cities and governments have undertaken efforts to measure happiness and well-being (also termed "Beyond GDP") since the High Level Meeting in 2012, but have not used versions of Bhutan's GNH index. Among these include the national governments of the United Kingdom's Office of National Statistics and the United Arab Emirates, and cities including Somerville, Massachusetts, United States, and Bristol, United Kingdom. Also a number of companies which are implementing sustainability practices in business that have been inspired by GNH.

== Criticism ==
GNH has been described by critics as a propaganda tool used by the Bhutanese government to distract from ethnic cleansing and human rights abuses it has committed.

The Bhutanese democratic government started in 2008. Before then, the government practiced massive ethnic cleansing of the non-Buddhist population of ethnic Nepalese of Hindu faith in the name of GNH cultural preservation. The NGO Human Rights Watch documented the events. According to Human Rights Watch, "Over 100,000 or 1/6 of the population of Bhutan of Nepalese origin and Hindu faith were expelled from the country because they would not integrate with Bhutan's Buddhist culture." The Refugee Council of Australia stated that "it is extraordinary and shocking that a nation can get away with expelling one sixth of its people and somehow keep its international reputation largely intact. The Government of Bhutan should be known not for Gross National Happiness but for Gross National Hypocrisy."

Some researchers state that Bhutan's GNH philosophy "has evolved over the last decade through the contribution of western and local scholars to a version that is more democratic and open. Therefore, probably, the more accurate historical reference is to mention the coining of the GNH phrase as a key event, but not the Bhutan GNH philosophy, because the philosophy as understood by western scholars is different from the philosophy used by the King at the time." Other viewpoints are that GNH is a process of development and learning, rather than an objective norm or absolute end point. Bhutan aspires to enhance the happiness of its people and GNH serves as a measurement tool for realizing that aspiration.

Other criticism focuses on the standard of living in Bhutan. In an article written in 2004 in the Economist magazine, "The Himalayan kingdom of Bhutan is not in fact an idyll in a fairy tale. It is home to perhaps 900,000 people most of whom live in grinding poverty." Other criticism of GNH cites "increasing levels of political corruption, the rapid spread of diseases, and other woes; such as AIDS and tuberculosis, gang violence, abuses against women and ethnic minorities, shortages in food/medicine, and economic woes."

== See also ==
- Bhutan
  - Development Challenges in Bhutan
  - Small Is Beautiful
- Economics
  - Broad measures of economic progress
  - Happiness economics
  - Humanistic economics
- List of comparative social surveys
  - Gross Domestic Behavior (GDB) survey of India by states
  - Happy Planet Index, global index by country of human wellness and environmental impact
  - Human Development Index, World Bank's global index by country
  - Social credit system (SCS) of China by individual citizens of China
  - World Values Survey
- General
  - Life satisfaction
  - Minister of State for Happiness
  - Utilitarianism
