= Ngenpa Gudzom =

Meeting of Nine Evils

- Official name: Ngenpa Gudzom
- Also called: The Meeting of Nine Evils
- Observed by: Bhutan
- Type: Cultural
- Significance: The day of the Meeting of Nine Evils
- Date: 7th day of the 11th month of the Bhutanese calendar
- Frequency: Annual

Ngenpa Gudzom (Dzongkha: ངན་པ་དགུ་འཛོམས; Wylie: ngen pa gu 'dzoms which literally means (Ngenpa = Evil, Gu = Nine, Dzom = Meet)), also known as "The Meeting of Nine Evils", is one of the festivals in the Bhutan usually observed on the 7th day of the 11th month of Bhutanese Calendar, although the traditional astrological period of Ngyenpa Guzom begins from the 6th day. Ngenpa Guzom, is widely celebrated by the people of central and eastern regions of Bhutan.

The day is considered the most inauspicious day on the Bhutanese calendar and believed that there is no merit in performing any good deeds, and if anyone should do anything sinful, the negative karmic effects will be multiplied on this day. Some people refrain from doing important work, given the belief that nothing good can be achieved on this day. They generally spend the day partying and playing traditional games and do not engage in wholesome activities.

Nyenpa Guzom or The Meeting of Nine Evils is no more a national holiday in Bhutan. The day was removed from the national holiday list in 2007. It was removed by the then ministry of home and cultural affairs (now Ministry of Home Affairs) because Bhutan has too many public holidays. Some people argue that, unless Ngyenpa Guzom is reinstated as a public holiday, the importance of the day will be forgotten and that the future generations will have no idea about this tradition.

== History ==
Ngenpa Guzom falls on the day with the longest night of the year based on the lunar calendrical calculation and geomancy. It is the period of the malicious earth spirit Nyima Nagchen and eight other malicious spirits.

According to an old folktale from the geomantic tradition, an earth spirit named Yadud Dorje and his wife Sasrin Barma had five children—four daughters and a son named Rahula—during the time when sentient beings first appeared on Earth. Over time, the siblings got separated to the point where Rahula once met one of his sisters while travelling across Mount Meru, but he did not recognise her. They consequently engaged in incest on the 7th day of the 11th lunar month. Because of their interaction, the earth's atmosphere and the elements became contaminated, which resulted in several negative occurrences.

However, the negativity of Ngenpa Gudzom is countervailed by Zangpo Chuzom or the Day of Ten Positives, which falls on the following day.

== Practice ==
Since it is believed that during Ngyenpa Guzom negative overpower the positive forces, people do not engage either in negative or meritorious deeds. Instead, they stay at home resting and relaxing. On this inauspicious day, some activities like erecting new monuments, consecrating, pacifying local deities, reciting religious texts, learning, transferring and taking over properties, preaching, appointing new positions, moving, starting a new business, getting married, celebrating, travelling long distances, and selling land are discouraged.

Usually, Nyenpa Guzom is observed in the eastern part of Bhutan as a festival among the family members to eat, drink and play traditional games like archery, dego and khuru.

However, such traditional beliefs and celebrations have declined after Ngenpa Gudzom was delisted from the public holiday. Yet, the older generations still observe this day.

The Nyenpa Guzom or The Meeting of Nine Evils, 2025 falls on Monday 6 January 2025. As per the Pangrizampa College for Astrology, the inauspicious time begins from 4:01pm Bhutan Standard Time (BST) of 5 January 2025 to 1:37pm BST of 6 January 2025.

== Misconception ==
Since the day is considered the most inauspicious and the "day of evil", it is important to avoid misinterpreting the significance of the tradition of Ngenpa Gudzom by considering it as an opportunity to engage in negative and harmful activities, mistaking that misbehavior is acceptable on this day.

== See also ==
- Public holidays in Bhutan
- Tshechu
- Nyilo (Winter Solstice)
- Traditional Day of Offering
- Death Anniversary of Zhabdrung (Zhabdrung Kuchoe)
- Lord Buddha's Parinirvana
- Birth Anniversary of Guru Rinpoche
- First Sermon of Lord Buddha (Drugpa Tshezhi)
- Blessed Rainy Day
- Descending Day of Lord Buddha (Lhabab Düchen)
- National Day of Bhutan (Gyalyong Düchen)
