= Traditional Day of Offering =

Bhutanese New Year tradition

- Official name: Traditional Day of Offering
- Also called: Buelwa Phuewi Nyim (Chunipa Losar)
- Observed by: Bhutan
- Type: National
- Significance: Day of Offering
- Date: 1st day of the 12th month of the Bhutanese calendar
- Frequency: Annual

Traditional Day of Offering (Dzongkha: བུ་ལྭ་ཕེུ་ཝི་ཉིམ; Wylie: buelwa phuewi nyim), known as Chunipa Losar is a traditional Bhutanese New Year celebrated in Bhutan on the 1st day of the 12th month of the Bhutanese lunar calendar. It is also known as Sharchokpé (Sharchokpa) Losar, the New Year of the eastern Bhutanese as the day is popular in the eastern Bhutan.

The day is a national public holiday and usually falls in January or February of the Gregorian calendar. Government offices and institutions remain closed on this day. The day is celebrated to express love, gratitude and reverence to Zhabdrung Ngawang Namgyal who founded Bhutan as a nation.

Traditional Day of Offering was removed from the list of national holidays once but it was reinstated later.

== History ==
The Traditional Day of Offering known as Buelwa Phuewi Nyim originated when the representatives from all over the Bhutan offered Buelwa, to Zhabdrung at Punakha Dzong on the 1st day of the 12th month of the Bhutanese lunar calendar to show their gratitude for unifying the country in the 17th century. It is said that the Trongsa Penlop led the representatives of Sharchog Khorlo Tsibgye (Eight Spokes of the Wheel of Eastern Bhutan), Paro Penlop led the people of western Bhutan and Darkar Penlop led the people of the south in their offerings to Zhabdrung. Due to its significance, Zhabdrung chose this day as the time to change the officials of his new government and monastic body in Punakha. The day is regarded as the old Bhutanese New Year Day as the day was chosen by Zhabdrung himself. Since then, the auspicious day is observed as a Traditional Day of Offering.

== Significance ==
Traditional Day of Offering is regarded as the real Bhutanese New Year. It is the day that the representatives from Bhutan offered buelwa to Zhabdrung at Punakha Dzong. The day is observed to remember Zhabdrung Ngawang Namgyal, who united Bhutan. It is also showcases the spiritual connection between a leader and the subjects.

== Practice ==
In the past, Traditional Day of offering or Chunyipai Losar was celebrated for 15 days. On the day, special offerings are made in memory of Ngawang Namgyal. It is a thanksgiving day in Bhutan. Chunipa Losar is also to make offerings to the deities and ancestors. For families, it is an occasion to gather and feast on good food, donate food to the poor, and play games.

Chunipa Losar begin by waking up early, lighting butter lamps and preparing offerings like traditional "khabzey" (Bhutanese deep-fried cookies) and "khuley" (traditional pancake). These traditional dishes are then offered to deities and Ngawang Namgyal by placing at the altars. Then they prepare sumptuous meals and feast on varied delicacies starting with rice porridge, followed by suja (butter tea) and milk tea with snacks. Lunch and dinner would usually be red rice with meat dishes.

Many families gather and go out for picnic lunches in urban areas. The men participate and contest in the country’s national sport of archery. Other traditional sports like degor and Khuru are also played. Some also visit monasteries and temples to make offerings. In the evening, men and women often have gatherings at one of the households to party.

The Traditional Day of Offering (Chunipa Losar), 2025 falls on Thursday the 30th of January 2025.

== See also ==
- Public holidays in Bhutan
- Tshechu
- Nyilo (Winter Solstice)
- Ngenpa Gudzom
- Death Anniversary of Zhabdrung (Zhabdrung Kuchoe)
- Lord Buddha's Parinirvana
- Birth Anniversary of Guru Rinpoche
- First Sermon of Lord Buddha (Drugpa Tshezhi)
- Blessed Rainy Day
- Descending Day of Lord Buddha (Lhabab Düchen)
- National Day of Bhutan (Gyalyong Düchen)
