= Nyilo =

Winter Solstice in Bhutan

- Official name: Nyilo
- Also called: Winter Solstice
- Observed by: Bhutan
- Type: National
- Significance: The return of sun
- Date: 11th month of the Bhutanese calendar
- Frequency: Annual

Nyilo (Dzongkha: ཉི་ལོག་; Wylie: nyi log; "return of the sun"; also known as Nyinlog) is a traditional new year of the Shar and Wang region of western Bhutan celebrated annually. It falls in the 11th month of the Bhutanese calendar, which corresponds to early January. The day literally means the return of the sun and is a day of celebrations welcoming longer days by the farmers to work in the fields. Nyilo last from three days to a week in the Wang Tsho Chhen Gey region.

The day is a public holiday and all the government offices and institutions remain closed. Nyilo is the shortest day of the year and the first day of winter in the Bhutanese calendar, which is based on Buddhist astrology. After Nyilo, the days get longer until the summer solstice.

Every year, a group of students from schools in Thimphu perform Lolay— traditional verses of good wishes in front of His Majesty The King and Her Majesty The Gyaltsuen at the Lingkana Palace to mark Nyilo. It has become a regular tradition for Their Majesties to welcome children reciting Lolay to Lingkana Palace to celebrate Nyilo each year.

== History ==
The Nyilo celebration is believed to have originated in Wang, the present day Thimphu. According to one folklore, on the day of Nyilo, the sun returns from the south after paying respect to Shinje, one of the deities of the Ten Directions. The majority of Nyilo celebrations are based on Bonism, a religion with origins in animism and ancient shamanic practices.

== Significance ==
Nyilo is regarded as the most auspicious day of the year for the people of Bhutan. They believe that on Nyilo, past misdeeds may be forgiven and good deeds will multiply. Therefore, people are discouraged from engaging in negative activities.

== Practice ==
Nyilo is usually celebrated for a day, although people in the Wang region celebrate it from three days to a week. The celebrations start from Nyilo Eve. On the eve of Nyilo, children and adults gather into small groups and go around their village from house to house singing the Lolay song. As they chant traditional words of prayers to bring good fortune to their locality in the new year, the head of family offers gifts to them in return.

Traditional Lolay Recitation in the local dialect:

"Oka Nor Gi Gang Chuu—Lolay, Lolay!

Barkheb Ju Gi Gang Chuu—Lolay, Lolay!

Tengtho Mi Gi Gang Chuu—Lolay, Lolay!

Chimtho Dar Gi Gang Chuu—Lolay, Lolay!"

In English, the verse translates roughly to:

"May the ground floor be filled with cattle—good year!

And middle floor be filled with wealth—good year!

May the top floor be filled with people—good year!

And the rooftop be filled with flags—good year!"

Next day, the children gather together and use whatever they have collected for a party. Usually the children spend the day out in the wild in a selected spot , where they have a sumptuous party. For the villagers, Nyilo is a break from their hectic farming schedule. The celebration begins with hot tea and porridge, along with an array of home-made delicacies. The men usually engage in an inter-village archery match called Choda, which goes on for three to four days, as well as degor and khuru matches.

However, the tradition of Lolay singing is on the verge of disappearance. Over time, many individuals have become less familiar with this custom. While many people are not taking interest in the celebrations, some disregard such traditions. Therefore, Zhung Dratshang, in collaboration with the De-suung Nangchoe Programme, conducts orientation and training programs among young children to promote the tradition of Lolay recitation.

The Nyilo (Winter Solstice) 2025 was celebrated on Thursday the 2nd of January 2025. On the Nyilo Eve, a group of elderly citizens came together reciting Lolay through the busy street in Thimphu moving from shop to shop, reminding everyone of a culture slipping into the shadows of time. To commemorate Nyilo, a group of schoolchildren from Thimphu recited Lolay in front of Their Majesties the King and the Gyaltsuen, as well as Their Royal Highnesses Gyalsey Jigme Namgyel Wangchuck, Gyalsey Ugyen Wangchuck, and Gyalsem Sonam Yangden Wangchuck at Lingkana Palace.

== See also ==
- Public holidays in Bhutan
- Tshechu
- Ngenpa Gudzom
- Traditional Day of Offering
- Death Anniversary of Zhabdrung (Zhabdrung Kuchoe)
- Lord Buddha's Parinirvana
- Birth Anniversary of Guru Rinpoche
- First Sermon of Lord Buddha (Drugpa Tshezhi)
- Blessed Rainy Day
- Descending Day of Lord Buddha (Lhabab Düchen)
- National Day of Bhutan (Gyalyong Düchen)
