= 2025 in Bhutan =

- Decades: 2000s; 2010s; 2020s
- See also: Other events of 2025; Timeline of Bhutanese history

Events during the year 2025 in Bhutan.

== Incumbents ==
Photo	Post	Name
	King of Bhutan	Jigme Khesar Namgyel Wangchuck
	Prime Minister of Bhutan	Tshering Tobgay

== Events ==
- 25 December – Bhutan political prisoner Sha Bahadur Gurung dies in Chamgang Central Prison.

== Holidays ==
- 2 January – Winter solstice (Nyi)
- 30 January – Traditional Day of Offering
- 21–23 February – Birth Anniversary of His Majesty the King
- 28 February 1 March – Losar New Year
- 2 May – Birth Anniversary of Third Druk Gyalpo
- 7 May – Shabdrung Kurchoe
- 11 June – Lord Buddha's Parinirvana
- 5 July – Sun Birth Anniversary of Guru Rinpoche
- 28 July – First Sermon of Lord Buddha
- 23 September – Sun Blessed Rainy Day
- 2 October – Sat Dashain Festival
- 1 November – Coronation of His Majesty the King
- 11 November – Birth Anniversary of Fourth Druk Gyalpo
- 11 November – Descending Day of Lord Buddha
- 17 December – National Day

== Events ==
- March 28 – Bhutan exports its wine for the first time.
- March 31 – A bank teller in Paro is arrested for embezzling $83,300.
- April 2-3 – The Olympic Council of Asia (OCA)-Olympic Solidarity (OS) Regional Forum is held in Thimphu.
