= 2024 in Bhutan =

- Decades: 2000s; 2010s; 2020s
- See also: Other events of 2024; Timeline of Bhutanese history

Events during the year 2024 in Bhutan.

== Incumbents ==
Photo	Post	Name
	King of Bhutan	Jigme Khesar Namgyel Wangchuck
	Prime Minister of Bhutan	Tshering Tobgay

== Events ==
- 9 January – 2023–24 Bhutanese National Assembly election (second round): Voters elect 47 members of the National Assembly.
- 18 March – Indian Prime Minister visits Bhutan. Both nations signs MoUs to strengthened ties, energy, infrastructure, and development.

== Holidays ==
- 3 January – Winter solstice (Nyi
- 12 January – Traditional Day of Offering
- 10–11 February – Losar New Year
- 21–23 February – Birth Anniversary of His Majesty the King
- 18 April – Shabdrung Kurchoe
- 2 May – Birth Anniversary of Third Druk Gyalpo
- 23 May – Lord Buddha's Parinirvana
- 16 June – Sun Birth Anniversary of Guru Rinpoche
- 10 July – First Sermon of Lord Buddha
- 22 September – Sun Blessed Rainy Day
- 12 October – Sat Dashain Festival
- 1 November – Coronation of His Majesty the King
- 11 November – Birth Anniversary of Fourth Druk Gyalpo
- 22 November – Descending Day of Lord Buddha
- 17 December – National Day
