= Public holidays in Bhutan =

- Observed by: Bhutan
- Type: National
- Significance: National and cultural celebrations
- Date: Various (see article)
- Frequency: Annual

Public holidays in Bhutan consist of both national holidays and local festivals or tshechus. While national holidays are observed throughout Bhutan, tsechus are only observed in their areas. Bhutan uses its own calendar, a variant of the lunisolar Tibetan calendar. Because it is a lunisolar calendar, dates of some national holidays and most tshechus change from year to year. For example, the new year, Losar, generally falls between February and March.

== National holidays ==
Bhutan has sixteen public holidays. Bhutanese holidays are rooted in the Drukpa Lineage of Kagyu Buddhism, the House of Wangchuck and the Tibetan calendar. Even secular holidays, however, have a measure of religious overtone, as religious choreography and blessings mark these auspicious days.

=== Winter solstice ===
Winter solstice celebration in Bhutan known as Nyilo (Dzongkha: ཉི་ལོག, Wylie: nyi log "return of the sun"), is a public holiday. Nyinlog is considered the most auspicious day of the year. It is celebrated like new year among some western Bhutan, though more so in the central and eastern regions, where the shortest day of the year is marked with archery and feasting.

=== Traditional Day of Offering ===
The Traditional Day of Offering (Dzongkha: buelwa phuewi nyim) is a holiday usually falling in January or February, on the 1st day of the 12th month of the calendar. The main purpose behind this holiday is to give thanks to Zhabdrung Ngawang Namgyal, the founder of Bhutan. It also focuses on charity, particularly feeding others, and recreation. The day is celebrated with feasting and traditional sports, including archery, digor, and khuru (darts). This holiday may have originally begun as a Bhutanese new year celebration.

=== Losar ===
Dawa Dangpa Losar (Dzongkha ལོ་གསར་, Wylie: lo gsar), or simply Dangpa losar, the Bhutanese New Year is celebrated on the 1st day of the 1st month of the Bhutanese lunar calendar, which usually falls between February and March. Festivities last 15 days, ahead of which people spend much time preparing food and alcohol and cleaning their homes of old and unused objects. The common Losar greeting is "Losar Tashi Delek."

=== Birthday of King Jigme Khesar Namgyel Wangchuck ===
February 21–23 are holidays commemorating the birth anniversary of Jigme Khesar Namgyel Wangchuck the 5th and current Druk Gyalpo.

=== Zhabdrung Kuchoe ===
Zhabdrung Kurchoe marks the passing of Zhabdrung Ngawang Namgyal in 1651 at Punakha Dzong. It is observed on the 10th day of the 3rd month of the Bhutanese calendar. The holiday is a national day of mourning.

=== Birthday of King Jigme Dorji Wangchuck ===
May 2 is the birth anniversary of Jigme Dorji Wangchuck the 3rd Druk Gyalpo, who began Bhutan's first steps toward modernization (b. 1928, Thruepang Palace, Trongsa).

The day is also celebrated as Teacher's day throughout the country. The day sees students coordinating various programs at schools and institution showing gratitude to their teachers. Students gift cards to Teachers, while some students substitute their teachers in class to give them a time-out. The day also constitute cultural programs showcasing various dance and song items focusing on teachers and their contributions. The day usually ends with a common meal for the entire school or institution.

=== Coronation of King Jigme Singye Wangchuck ===
June 2 is the coronation day of the Jigme Singye Wangchuck, the 4th Druk Gyalpo (1974). It also doubles as Social Forestry Day, where children plant trees.

=== Lord Buddha's Parinirvana ===
Lord Buddha's Parinirvana Day or Duechen Nga Zom is observed on the 15th day of the 4th month of Bhutanese calendar. On this day, Lord Buddha was conceived, born, subdued evil, gained enlightenment and attained Nirvana. The day is considered as one of the most auspicious days for Buddhists and is a public holiday in Bhutan.

=== Birth Anniversary of Guru Rinpoche ===
The Birth Anniversary of Guru Rinpoche is observed on the 10th day of the 5th month of the Bhutanese calendar in Bhutan.

=== First Sermon of Lord Buddha ===
The First Sermon of Lord Buddha is observed on the 4th day of the 6th month of the Bhutanese calendar. It is also known as Drugpa Tshezhi, and is one of the holiest days in the Buddhist calendar. On this day, Lord Buddha delivered his first sermon or turned the first wheel of dharma at Sarnath. Therefore, the day is also called Chokhor Duechen.

=== Blessed Rainy Day ===
Blessed Rainy Day (Dzongkha: thruebab) generally falls in September 23. and is held on an auspicious day during monsoon season. The traditional holiday has not always been a public holiday, but was rather recently reinstated to official status. The event is marked by feasting, drinking alcohol, playing traditional sports, and purification through washing. In some parts of Pemagatshel, the traditional celebrations are more intense than those of even Losar.

=== Dashain ===
Dashain, the main Nepalese (and Hindu festival, falls on October 6. During this holiday, houses are cleaned and replastered, gifts are exchanged, and families gather. Dashain has been a public holiday in Bhutan.

=== Coronation of King Jigme Khesar Namgyel Wangchuck ===
November 1 marks the coronation day of Jigme Khesar Namgyel Wangchuck, the 5th and current Druk Gyalpo (2008).

=== Birthday of King Jigme Singye Wangchuck ===
November 11 marks the birth anniversary of Jigme Singye Wangchuck, the 4th Druk Gyalpo (b. 1955, Dechencholing Palace, Thimphu). The holiday is also called Constitution Day; under this king and at his behest, the Constitution of Bhutan was enacted.

=== Lhabab Duchen ===
Lhabab Duchen or Descending Day of Lord Buddha is a public holiday observed on 22nd day of the 9th month of the Bhutanese lunar calendar. Lhabab Duchen marks Gautama Buddha's return to Earth after attaining Nirvana. In the eastern regions of Bhutan, the holiday is a popular occasion for performing Lhasoel, which are religious offerings in the form of ara (traditional wine), blessings, and supplications.

=== National Day of Bhutan ===
The National Day (Gyalyong Duechen) of Bhutan is December 17. The date marks the coronation of Ugyen Wangchuck as the first Druk Gyalpo of modern Bhutan. Celebrations are held at Changlimithang Stadium, and include a public address by the Druk Gyalpo and a procession including a statue of Ugyen Wangchuck to honor the first Druk Gyalpo and the independent Bhutanese nation.

== Other Major Festivals ==
These are other major festive celebrations in Bhutan that are not part of the national public holidays.

=== Lomba Festival ===
Lomba Festival is a New Year of two western districts of Paro and Haa. The festival falls on the 29th day of the 9th lunar month in the Bhutanese calendar. Hoentay is an important part of the Lomba for the people of Haa while for the people for Paro is called Jomju.

=== Ngenpa Gudzom ===
Ngenpa Gudzom is one of the major festive events in the Bhutanese calendar usually observed on the 7th day of the 11th Bhutanese month annually. The day is considered the most inauspicious day on the Bhutanese calendar. It is widely celebrated by the people of central and eastern regions of Bhutan. Nyenpa Guzom or The Meeting of Nine Evils is not a public holiday in Bhutan. The day was removed from the national holiday list in 2007.

== Tsechus ==
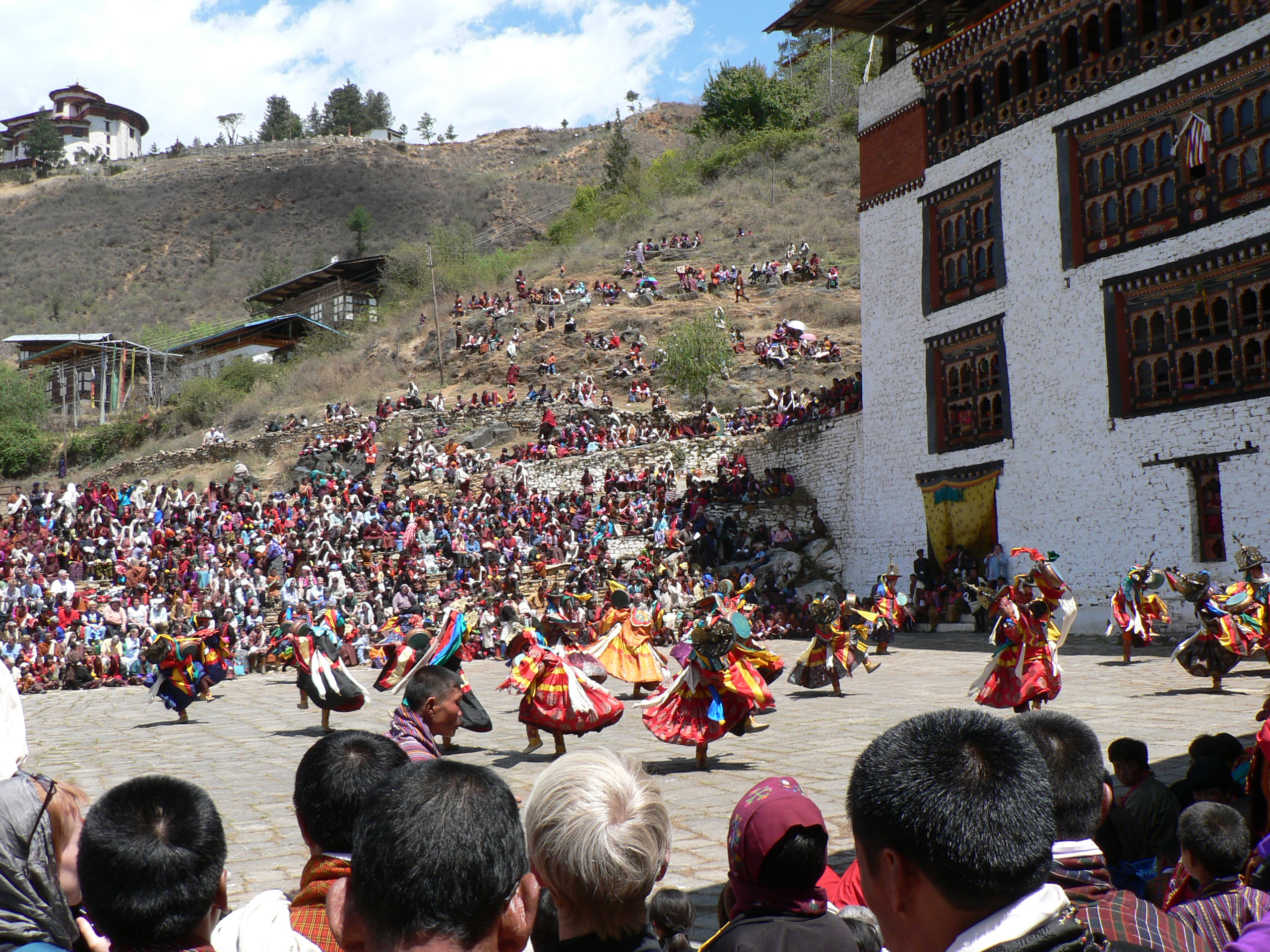
Paro tsechu

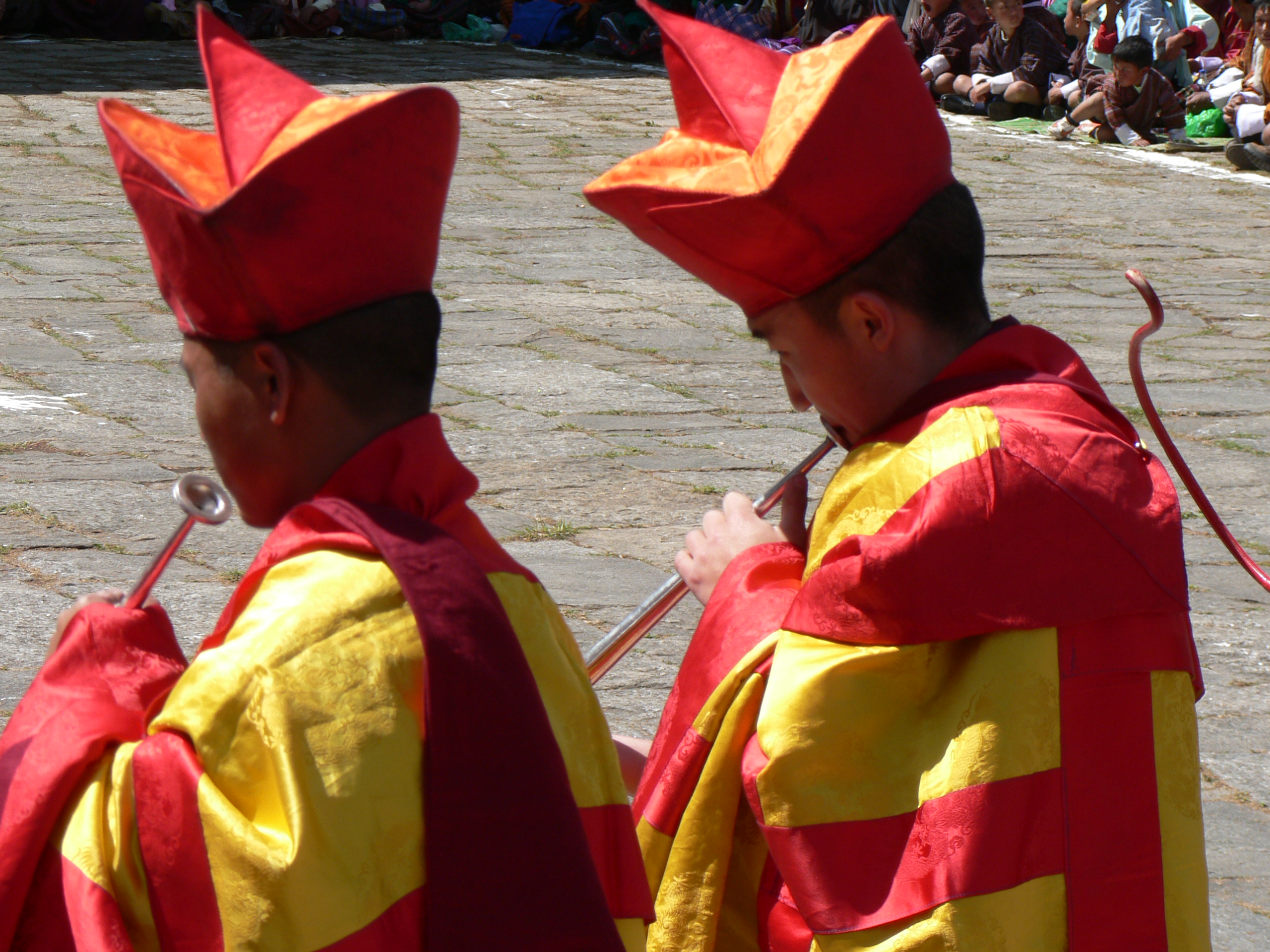
Second day opening session, Paro tsechu

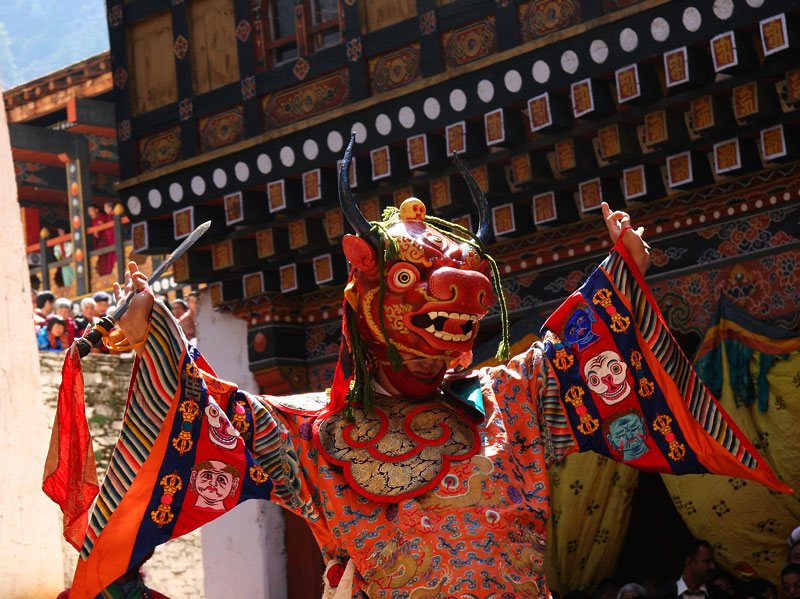
Dance of the Lord of Death, Paro

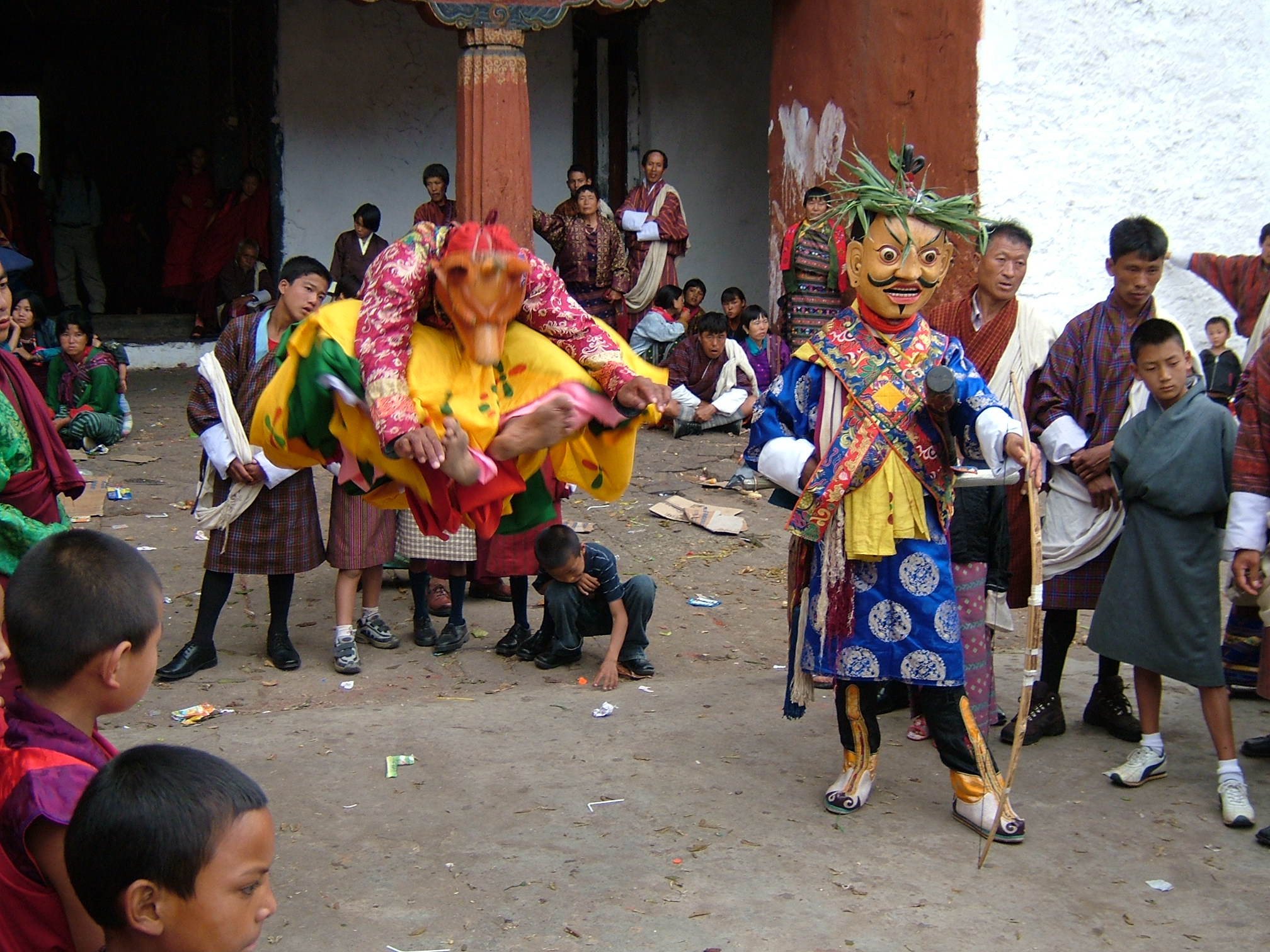
Masked cham dancers, Wangdue Phodrang tsechu

Numerous tsechus, or festivals, take place for up to five days each at different locales across Bhutan. These usually feature large-scale pageantry and costumes, allegorical dances, archery, and music. These festivals are centuries-old traditions functioning not only as links to the past but also attract large numbers of tourists.

Below is a list of major tsechus in Bhutan, along with their 2011 dates. Dates in other years will vary.

Bhutan tsechu dates (2019)
Date	Tsechu	Location
January 2–04	Trongsa Tsechu	Trongsa
January 2–04	Lhuntse Tsechu	Lhuntse
January 2–04	Pemagatshel Tsechu	Pemagatshel
January 9	Shingkhar Metochodpa	Bumthang
January 9–13	Nabji Lhakhang Drup	Trongsa
February 10–15	Punakha Dromache & Tshechu	Punakha
February 17–21	Tangsibi Mani	Bumthang
February 18	Chorten Kora	Trashiyangtse
February 18	Tharpaling Thongdrol	Bumthang
February 19–21	Buli Mani Chumey	Bumthang
February–March (1st month, 7th day)	Trashiyangtse Tsechu	Trashiyangtse
March 4	Chorten Kora (2nd)	Trashiyangtse
March 13–15	Gomkora	Trashigang
March 13–15	Talo Tsechu	Talo, Punakha
March 13–16	Zhemgang Tsechu	Zhemgang
March 15–19	Paro Tshechu	Paro
March 17–19	Chhukha Tshechu	Chukha
April 1–03	Gaden Chodpa	Ura, Bumthang
May 12–14	Domkhar Festival	Chhume, Bumthang
May 14–18	Ura Yakchoe	Ura, Bumthang
June 19–21	Padsel–Ling Kuchod	Bumthang
June	Laya Bumkhosa Festival (Bongkor)	Laya
July 8–10	Nimalung Tshechu	Bumthang
July 9–10 does not move	Alpine	Ha, Haa
July 10	Kurjey Tshechu	Bumthang
July 29	Gangte Kurim	Gangte, Wangdue Phodrang
October 1–05	Thimphu Drupchen	Thimphu
October 4–06	Wangdue Tsechu	Wangdue Phodrang
October 4–06	Gangte Drubchen & Tsechu	Gangte, Wangdue Phodrang
October 6–08	Tamshingphala Choepa	Bumthang
October 6–08	Gasa Tsechu	District Gasa
October 6–08	Thimphu Tshechu	Thimphu
October 10–12	Thangbi Mani	Bumthang
November 1–05	Shingkhar Rabney	Ura, Bumthang
November 3–06	Jakar Tsechu	Jakar, Bumthang
November 10–14	Jambay Lakhang Drup	Bumthang
November 11–13	Prakhar Duchoed	Bumthang
November 12 does not move	Black Necked Crane Festival	Gangte, Wangdue Phodrang
November 22–25	Sumdrang Kangsol	Ura, Bumthang
December 2–05	Trashigang Tsechu	Trashigang
December 2–05	Mongar Tsechu	Mongar
December 3–04	Tang Namkha Rabney Tang	Bumthang
December 10	Singye Cham, Jambay Lhakhang	Bumthang
December 10–12	Nalakhar Tsechu	Bumthang
December 10–13	Chojam Rabney Tang	Bumthang

== See also ==
- Dashain
- Lhabab Duchen
- Losar
- Tsechu
- Culture of Bhutan
- National Day of Bhutan
