= Abhidhamma Day =

BUddhist tradition

Abhidhamma Day (Burmese: အဘိဓမ္မာနေ့), also known as Abhidhamma Divas in India, is a Theravada Buddhist tradition celebrated primarily in Myanmar and India. It is also celebrated by some Buddhists in Indonesia. Abhidhamma Day celebrates Gautama Buddha's descent from Tāvatiṃsa heaven after teaching his mother the Abhidhamma.

It is celebrated on the full moon of the seventh month of the Burmese lunar year which starts in April, and coincides with the end of the (first) Rains Retreat and the Pavāraṇa ceremony. The seventh month corresponds to October. The 2024 date for this event is October 17th.

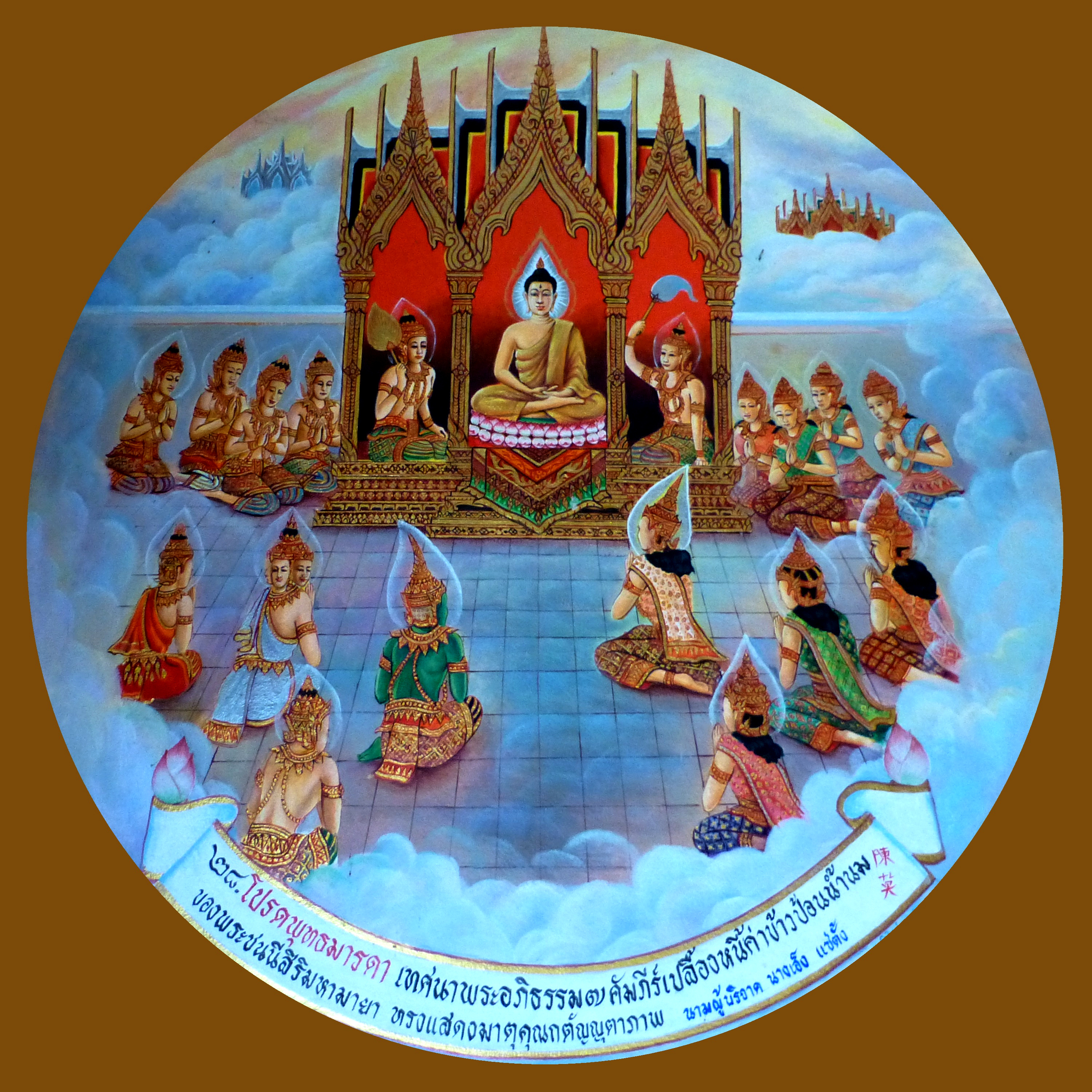
Buddha teaching the Abhidhamma to his mother and the Devas in the Trāyastriṃśa Heaven. Painted representation, Chedi Traiphop Traimongkhon Temple, Hat Yai, Thailand.

== See also ==
- Thadingyut Festival
- Lhabab Duchen
