= 2007 in Bhutan =

- Decades: 1980s; 1990s; 2000s; 2010s; 2020s
- See also: Other events of 2007; Timeline of Bhutanese history

Events from the year 2007 in Bhutan

== Incumbents ==
- Monarch: Jigme Khesar Namgyel Wangchuck
- Prime Minister: Khandu Wangchuk (until 31 July), Kinzang Dorji (starting 31 July)

== Events ==
=== May ===
- May 27: Nepalese police clash with Bhutanese asylum seekers at a United Nations resulting in one 16-year-old boy being killed and a dozen people being injured.

=== December ===
- December 29: Singye Galeem film is released.
