= Linge Ping =

Traditional Nepalese festive swing

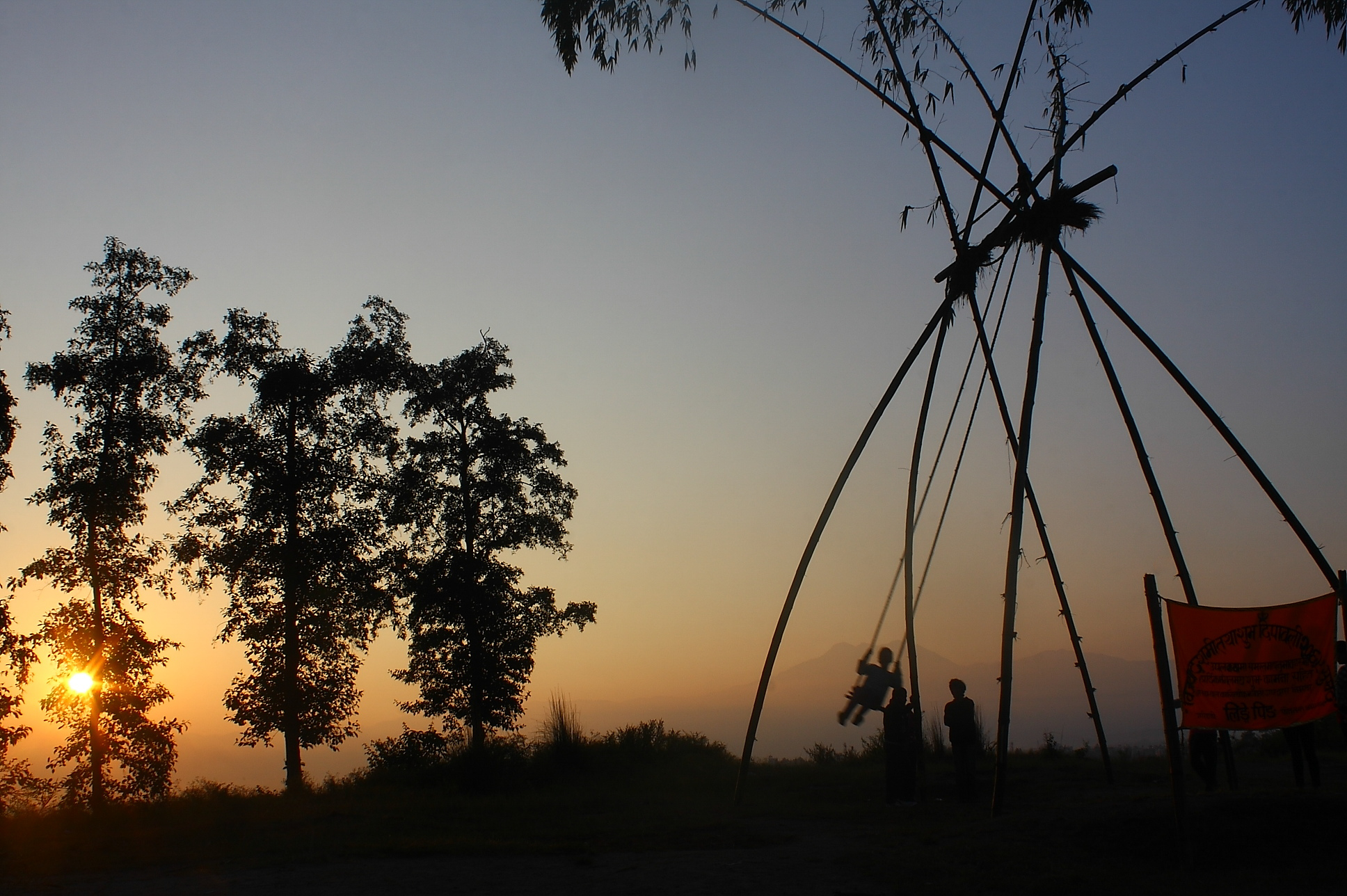
These traditional swings are generally erected during the Dashain festival

Linge Ping (Nepali: लिङ्गे पिङ) is a traditional swing constructed during the festival of Dashain in Nepal. The shape of the swing is in the shape of Shiva Linga, hence the name. It is believed that one must leave the ground once a year by riding the swing in the Dashain festival. During Dashain, multiple fairs are held and Linge Ping, and wooden Ferris wheels (Pirke Ping) are constructed.

== Construction ==
The swing is built with four bamboos connected together at the top and jute rope is used to make the hanging portion of swing. It is ridden alone or by two persons in sitting or standing position. The momentum is gained initially by the external force but later the rider pushes themselves by changing their position to gain elevation.

The tradition of constructing the swing is reducing recently due to lack of interest in young generation and lack of space in urban areas.

== Gallery ==
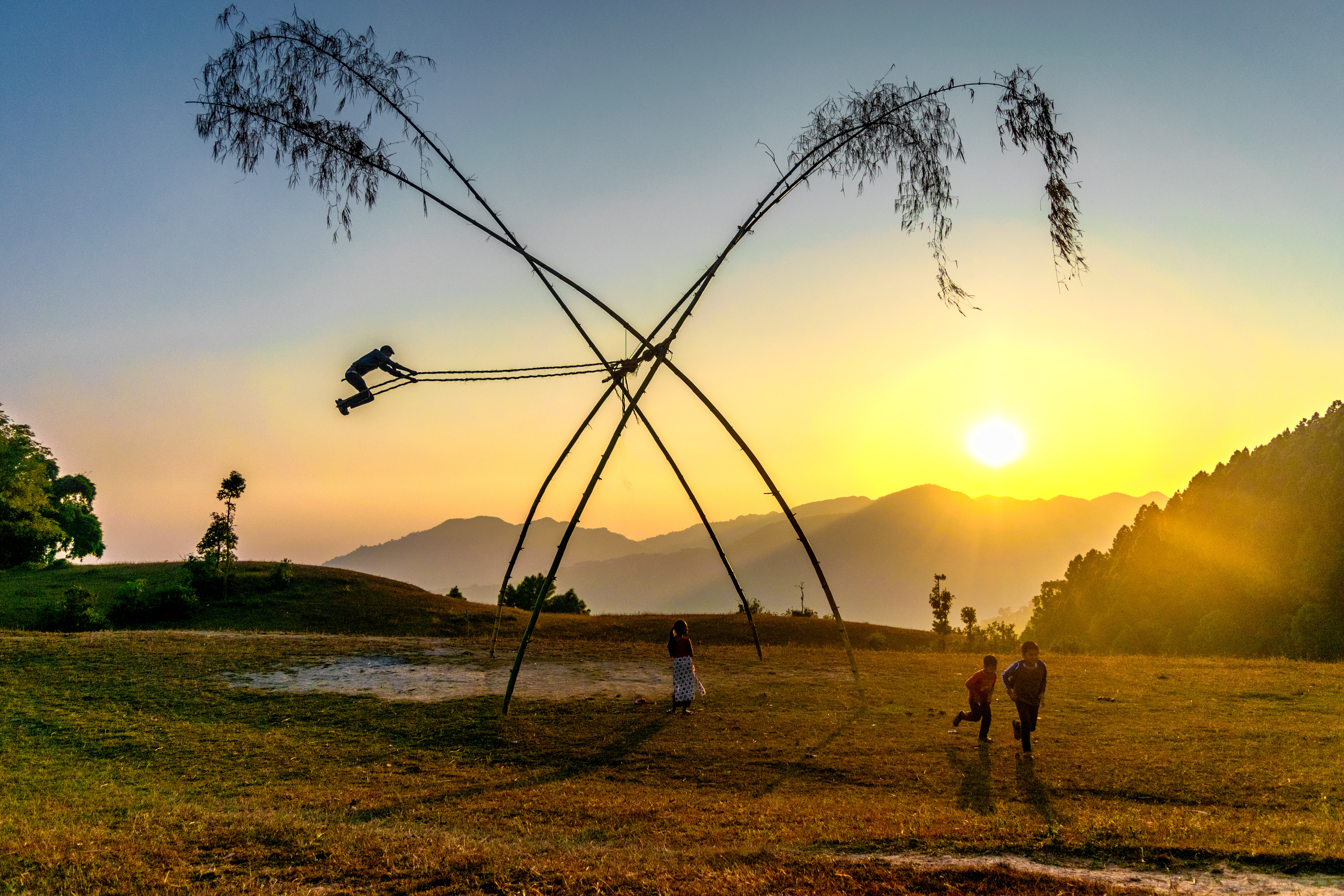
Children playing Linge Ping at Palpa, Nepal (2019)

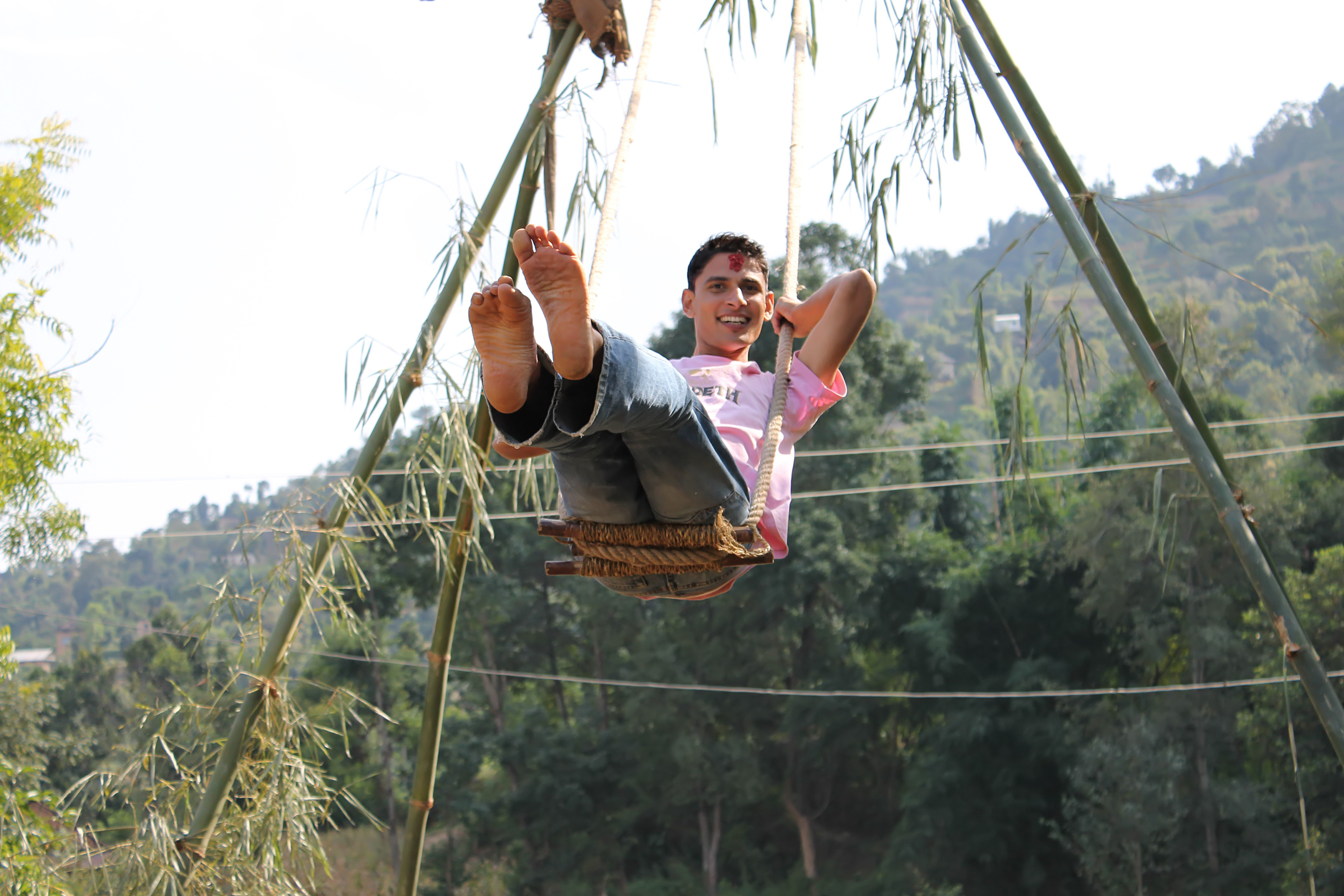
A man swinging in the swing during Dashain festival

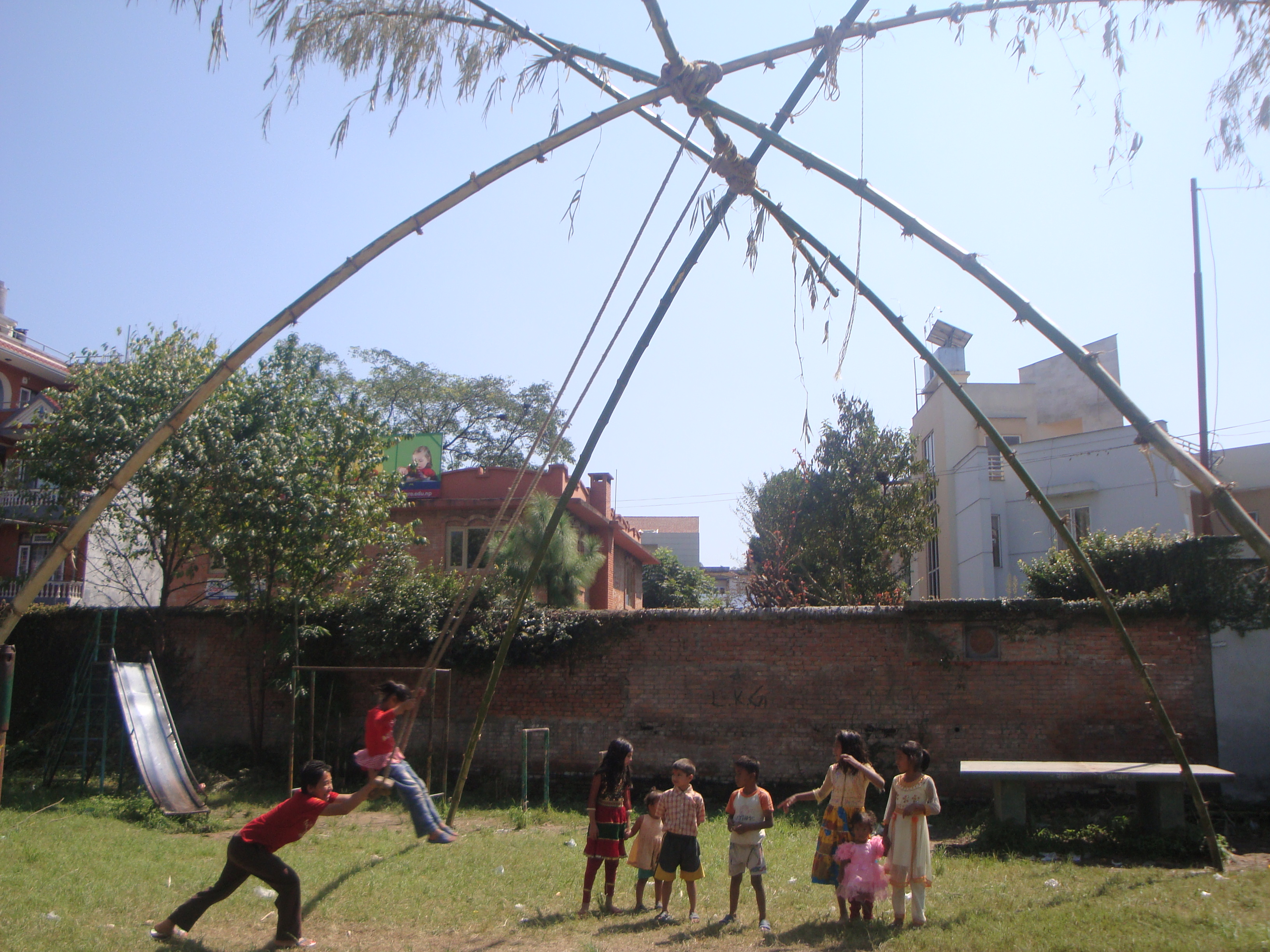
Children standing in a queue for the swing

== See also ==
- Dashain
- Tihar
