= 2009 in Bhutan =

- Decades: 1980s; 1990s; 2000s; 2010s; 2020s
- See also: Other events of 2009; Timeline of Bhutanese history

The following events happened in Bhutan in the year 2009.

== Incumbents ==
- Monarch: Jigme Khesar Namgyel Wangchuck
- Prime Minister: Jigme Thinley

== Events ==
=== September ===
- September 21 - A 6.1 magnitude earthquake occurs in eastern Bhutan and is felt in northeast India, Tibet and Bangladesh, leaving at least 10 dead.
- September 22 - Rescue teams scour eastern Bhutan after at least 11 people are killed by an earthquake which struck the region.
- September 23 - Prime Minister of Bhutan Jigme Thinley describes an earthquake which hit the Himalayan kingdom on Monday as "one of the biggest disasters in recent times".
