= 2017 in Bhutan =

- Decades: 1990s; 2000s; 2010s; 2020s
- See also: Other events of 2017; Timeline of Bhutanese history

Events during the year 2017 in Bhutan.

== Incumbents ==
- Monarch: Jigme Khesar Namgyel Wangchuck
- Prime Minister: Tshering Tobgay
