= 2016 in Bhutan =

- Decades: 1990s; 2000s; 2010s; 2020s
- See also: Other events of 2016; Timeline of Bhutanese history

Events during the year 2016 in Bhutan.

== Incumbents ==
- King: Jigme Khesar Namgyel Wangchuck
- Prime Minister: Tshering Tobgay

== Events ==
- 2016 Bhutan National League
