= 2023 in Bhutan =

- Decades: 2000s; 2010s; 2020s
- See also: Other events of 2023; Timeline of Bhutanese history

Events during the year 2023 in Bhutan.

== Incumbents ==
Photo	Post	Name
	King of Bhutan	Jigme Khesar Namgyel Wangchuck
	Prime Minister of Bhutan	Lotay Tshering

== Events ==
- 20 March – Beginning of 2023 SAFF U-17 Women's Championship which could last till 28 March. Bhutan ended on final position in 2023 SAFF U-17 Women's Championship.
