= 2022 in Bhutan =

- Decades: 2000s; 2010s; 2020s
- See also: Other events of 2022; Timeline of Bhutanese history

Events during the year 2022 in Bhutan.

== Incumbents ==
Photo	Post	Name
	King of Bhutan	Jigme Khesar Namgyel Wangchuck
	Prime Minister of Bhutan	Lotay Tshering

== Events ==
- 14 January - Bhutan reports its first 14 cases of the SARS-CoV-2 Omicron variant in people who travelled abroad.
- 23 September - Bhutan reopens, scrapping COVID-19 related restrictions.
