= Singye Galeem =

- Directed by: Tshering Wangyel
- Written by: Tshering Penjore
- Screenplay by: Tshering Namgyel
- Produced by: Yeshey Tshering And Sonam Wangchuk
- Cinematography: Yeshey Gyeltshen
- Edited by: Tshering Wangyel
- Music by: Tsheten Dorji
- Release date: December 29, 2007 (Thimphu)
- Country: Bhutan
- Language: Dzongkha
- Budget: Nu 1.7M

This film Singye Galeem produced by Wisdom Picture was approved on 29 December 2007 for public exhibition in Bhutan.

== Plot ==
This is based on a true story of two lovers, Singye and Galem which happened in the early 1940s. Their story originated from Punakha which used to be the former capital of Bhutan. Singye works in the Punakha Dzong(Fortress/castle) as a messenger and Galem is an ordinary farm girl who is into weaving traditional clothes. It so happens that Singye meets Galem in the market where Galem has come to sell one of the clothes she wove. It's love at first sight and their romance begins. But unfortunately, their happiness comes to an end when the Chief of the district asks for Galem's hand for marriage. The chief also happens to be Singye's boss. At the same time, Singye is sent to a different location (Gasa) for an urgent task. Galem's parents agrees upon the offer provided by the Chief keeping in mind the wealth and fame that his daughter's matrimony would bring. However, Galem's heart breaks with the situation and she confesses to her father that she has already given her body and soul to a different man already. She further mentions that she is pregnant. These words deafens Galem's father and makes him furious; furious for bringing shame in the family, marrying a local man and having to disappoint the Chief. He then curses and ties her on a rock in the banks of the Moo Chu river.

== Songs ==
1. Nam kha yang me phodrang la
2. Lye kin nymph den pee gyelkhab
3. Dang Che wai kharsel dawa
4. Dangdra che Wei kharsel
5. Bu la pi gasum

== Production ==
The film was produced by Yeshey Tshering and Sonam Wangchuk. Film locations include Thimphu and Punakha.

== Filming Locations ==
1. Paro
2. Thimphu
3. Punakha
4. Gasa
5. Wangdue

== Awards ==
Best Film at the 1st Viewers Choice Awards 2009
