= 2020 in Bhutan =

- Decades: 2000s; 2010s; 2020s
- See also: Other events of 2020; Timeline of Bhutanese history

Events during the year 2020 in Bhutan.

== Incumbents ==
- Monarch: Jigme Khesar Namgyel Wangchuck
- Prime Minister: Lotay Tshering

== Events ==
- March 6 - The first confirmed COVID-19 case is reported, a 76-year-old US male who travelled to the country via India.
- March 22 - Jigme Khesar Namgyel Wangchuck announced in a national address that the country's land borders would be sealed off.
