= 2018 in Bhutan =

- Decades: 1990s; 2000s; 2010s; 2020s
- See also: Other events of 2018; Timeline of Bhutanese history

Events during the year 2018 in Bhutan.

== Incumbents ==
- Monarch: Jigme Khesar Namgyel Wangchuck
- Prime Minister: Tshering Tobgay (until 9 August), Tshering Wangchuk (9 August–7 November), Lotay Tshering (starting 7 November)
