= 2015 in Bhutan =

- Decades: 1990s; 2000s; 2010s; 2020s
- See also: Other events of 2015; Timeline of Bhutanese history

This article lists events from the year 2015 in Bhutan.

== Incumbents ==
- Monarch: Jigme Khesar Namgyel Wangchuck
- Prime Minister: Tshering Tobgay

== Events ==
- 25 April - Nepal earthquake

== Links ==
Media related to 2015 in Bhutan at Wikimedia Commons
