= 2021 in Bhutan =

- Decades: 2000s; 2010s; 2020s
- See also: Other events of 2021; Timeline of Bhutanese history

Events during the year 2021 in Bhutan.

== Incumbents ==
- Monarch: Jigme Khesar Namgyel Wangchuck
- Prime Minister: Lotay Tshering

== Events ==
- 8 January - Bhutan reports its first death from COVID-19 after a 34-year-old man with chronic liver disease and renal failure, who tested positive for COVID-19, died in a hospital in Thimphu.
- 20 January - India begins exporting the Oxford–AstraZeneca COVID-19 vaccine to Bhutan.
- 27 March - Bhutan launches their largest vaccination campaign against COVID-19 using the Oxford-AstraZeneca vaccine that was received from India.
- 24 December - Bhutan begins administering booster doses of the COVID-19 vaccine for people over the age of 65 years, overseas travellers, healthcare workers, people with underlying health conditions, and adults living in high risk areas.
