= 2011 in Bhutan =

- Decades: 1990s; 2000s; 2010s; 2020s
- See also: Other events of 2011; Timeline of Bhutanese history

The following lists events that happened during 2011 in Bhutan.

== Incumbents ==
- Monarch: Jigme Khesar Namgyel Wangchuck
- Prime Minister: Jigme Thinley

== Events ==
=== September ===
- September 18 – The 6.9 M_{w} Sikkim earthquake shook northeastern India with a maximum Mercalli intensity of VII (Very strong), leaving 111 people dead.

=== October ===
- October 13 – The King of Bhutan, Jigme Khesar Namgyal Wangchuck, marries 21-year-old college student Jetsun Pema in Punakha.
