= 2012 in Bhutan =

- Decades: 1990s; 2000s; 2010s; 2020s
- See also: Other events of 2012; Timeline of Bhutanese history

The following lists events that happened during 2012 in Bhutan.

== Incumbents ==
- Monarch: Jigme Khesar Namgyel Wangchuck
- Prime Minister: Jigme Thinley

== Events ==
=== June ===
- June 26 – Bhutan's four-century-old Wangdue Phodrang Dzong, a ridge-top monastery, catches fire and is destroyed; however no relics were destroyed since the monastery was undergoing a renovation.
