= Blessed Rainy Day =

Public holiday in Bhutan

- Official name: Blessed Rainy Day
- Also called: Trhuebab
- Observed by: Bhutan
- Significance: The descent (བབ་) of blessed water (ཁྲུས་) on earth
- Frequency: annual

Blessed Rainy Day (Dzongkha: ཁྲུས་འབབས་ཀྱི་ཉིནམ།), known as Trhuebab, is an important cultural event observed mainly in the eastern Bhutan. It literally mean the descent (བབ་) of blessed water (ཁྲུས་) on earth. The day celebrates neither the rainy season nor the end of the monsoon.

Bhutan observes Thrue Bab annually, on the autumn equinox. On this day all natural water resources in the country are considered to be sanctifying and citizens are encouraged to take an outdoor bath to be cleansed of "bad deeds, obstructions and defilements" and accumulated bad karma. Families traditionally gather for a meal of thup (porridge) at breakfast time.

Government offices, schools, and institutions are closed for the day. The government declared this day a public holiday in 1980. The holiday was removed from the public holiday list in 2007 to reduce public holidays. However, it was reinstated by the elected people’s assembly in 2008.

The most auspicious hour for the ablution is determined by astrologers in the service of the Je Khenpo, the chief abbot of the country. They refer to the Bhutanese lunar calendar (essentially the Tibetan lunar calendar), but the exact method of their calculations have not been disclosed. In 2004, they determined the preferred time to be 4:00 p.m., September 23. Citizens who are unable to bathe at the exact hour instead often rise before dawn for a brisk morning splash.

Variant romanizations of the Dzongkha name of the holiday include Thrue-Bab, Thrie-Bab, and Thri-Bab.

The official dates for recent Blessed Rainy Day celebrations are as follows:

- 2022 Fri, Sep 23
- 2023 Sat, Sep 23
- 2024 Mon, Sep 23
- 2025 Tue, Sep 23
- 2026 Wed, Sep 23

== See also ==
- Public holidays in Bhutan
- Tshechu
- Nyilo (Winter Solstice)
- Traditional Day of Offering
- Descending Day of Lord Buddha
- National Day of Bhutan
