= Dashain =

Regional Hindu festival

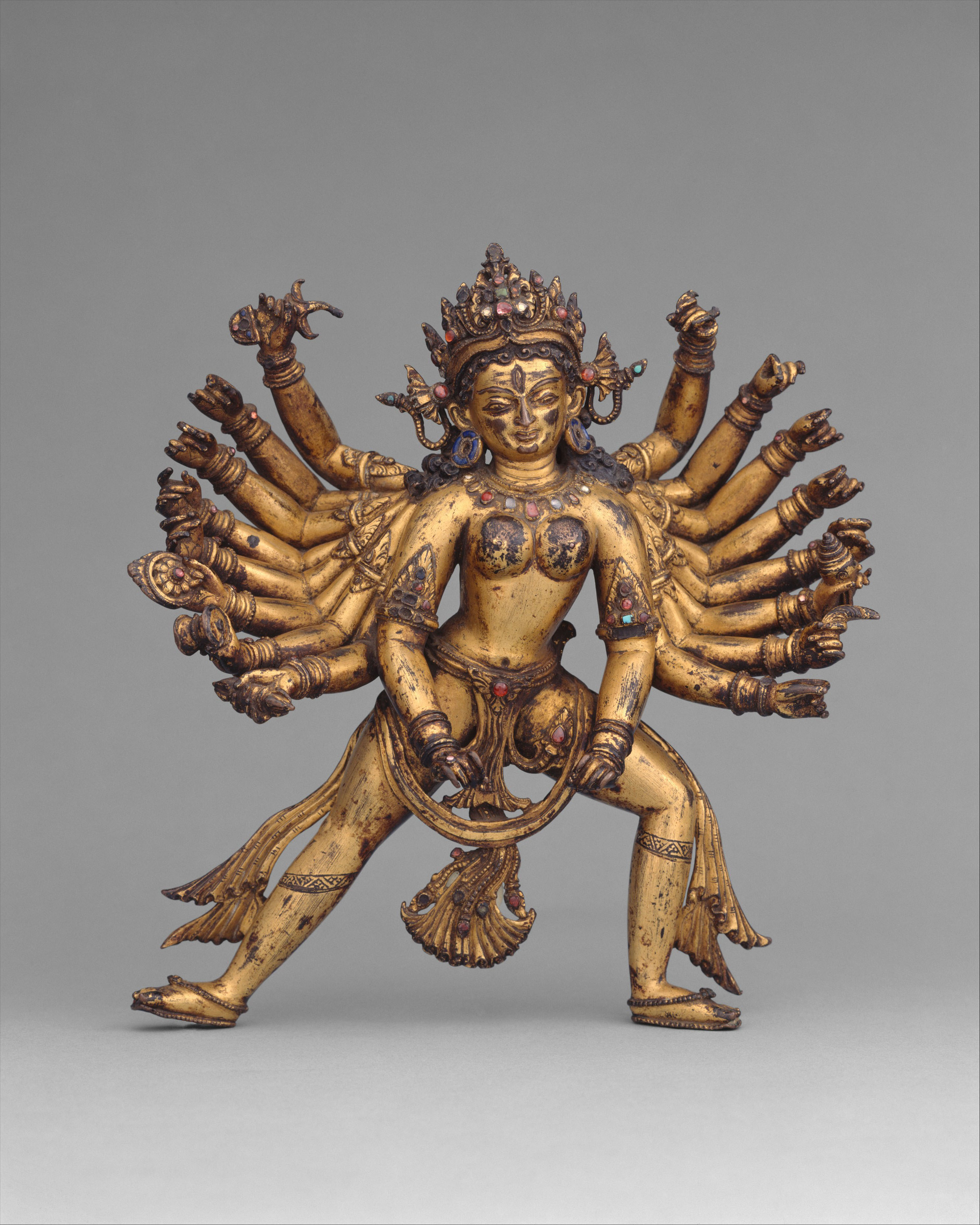
- Nepalese sculpture depicting Durga as the slayer of the demon Mahishasura
- Official name: Bada Dashain
- Also called: Bijayadashami, Nauratha
- Observed by: Nepal and regions with large Nepalese populations
- Type: Religious, cultural
- Significance: Commemorating the victory of good over evil
- Celebrations: Family reunions, feasts, flying kites, swinging on Linge Ping
- Observances: Sowing and receiving barley (jamara), worshipping nine forms of Durga (Navadurga), recitation of Chandi (Saptashati), animal sacrifices, visiting elders for Tika, gifts (Dakshina), community gatherings
- Date: Ashvin or Kartika (September to November)
- 2026 date: 11 October (begins); 25 October (ends)
- 2027 date: TBA (Note: The exact dates of Nepalese Hindu festivals are announced each year by the Government of Nepal after the official calendar is finalized. The dates are determined through annual Panchang (Hindu calendar) circulations based on the Bikram Sambat, the official calendar of Nepal. Once the circumstances are completed, the government publishes the annual calendar, which includes festivals days and public holidays.)
- Duration: 15 days
- Frequency: Annual
- Related to: Durga Puja, Vijaya Dashami, Navaratri

Dashain (Nepali: दशैँ), officially known as Bada Dashain, is the longest and most significant Hindu festival celebrated annually in Nepal according to the Bikram Sambat calendar. It is celebrated by Nepalese of all religions and border diaspora, as well as in regions where Nepalese population is in large number and Nepali cultural influences is prominent.

In Nepal, the 15-day celebration stands as the nation's grandest annual event, occurring in September or October, it begins during Shukla Paksha (the bright lunar fortnight) of the month of Ashvin and concludes on Purnima (the full moon). While observed across fifteen days, the most prominent days are 1st, 7th, 8th, 9th, 10th, 11th, and 15th.

Starting on the first day (Pratipada), devotees sequentially worship the nine manifestations (Navadurga) of Goddess Durga. Alongside these daily worships, the sacred Saptashati (Chandi) is recited, and special devotions are offered to the supreme three feminine powers—Mahakali, Mahalakshmi, and Mahasaraswati. During Dashain, people return home across the country and around the globe to celebrate with their families.

== Etymology ==
Bada Dashain (बडादशैँ) is a Nepali term made up of baḍā (बडा), meaning "great", and daśa͠i (दशैँ), meaning "tenth." It serves as the official name of the festival in Nepal. Commonly known simply as Dashain, the word comes from the Sanskrit term Daśamī (दशमी), meaning "tenth."

Although the festival lasts 15 days, the name Dashain refers specifically to its first ten days. Each day has its own name and religious significance. According to Hindu tradition, the goddess Durga fought the demon Mahishasura for nine nights while manifesting in different forms, She defeated the tenth day, known as Vijayadashami, the which marks her victory over the demon. The festival celebrates the victory of good over evil and honors the nine forms of goddess Durga, collectively known as Navadurga.

== Significance ==
Nepalese sculpture deplicting Durga slaying Mahishasura, c. 14th century

For followers of Shaktism, Dashain represents the victory of Durga over Mahishasura (who had terrorised the devas and usurped their abode, Svarga). The festival's first nine days symbolize the battle between different manifestations of Durga and Mahishasura; on the tenth day, Durga is victorious.

Dashain also represents the victory of Ram over Ravan (who had kidnapped Ram’s wife, Sita). Ram had defeated Ravan on the tenth day of Dashain or the Dashami.

== Day 1 ==
=== Ghatasthapana (घटस्थापना) ===
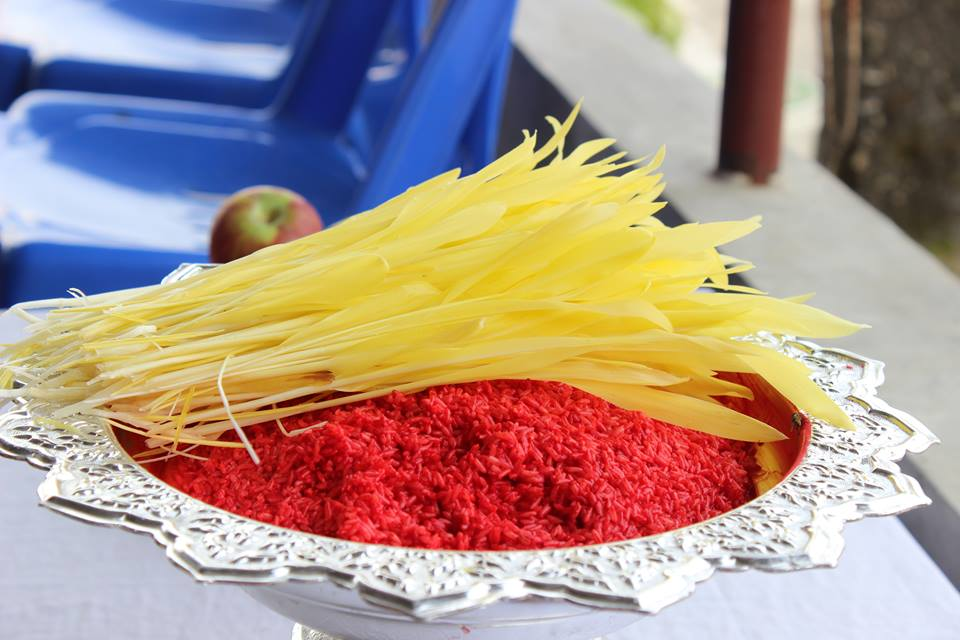
Jamara is sown on Ghatasthapna. The grass is grown in a dark room for nine days, and received as a prasad on the tenth day.

Ghatasthapana (घटस्थापना; "sowing jamara") is celebrated by Jhijhiya folk dancing across Mithila in Madhesh Province as the beginning of Dashain. A kalasha (pot) symbolizes Durga. It is filled with holy water in which barley seeds are sown, and placed in the center of a rectangular sand block. The remaining bed of sand is also seeded with grains. A priest begins the puja by asking Durga to bless the vessel with her presence. The ritual is performed at an astrologically determined time, and Durga is believed to reside in the vessel during Navaratri.

The puja room is known as the Dashain Ghar, which is traditionally closed to outsiders. The kalasha is worshiped in the morning and evening, and is kept away from direct sunlight. By the tenth day, the seed will have sprouted to five- or six-inch-long yellow grass known as jamara. The rituals continue until the seventh day.

== Day 7 ==
=== Phulpati (फूलपाती) ===
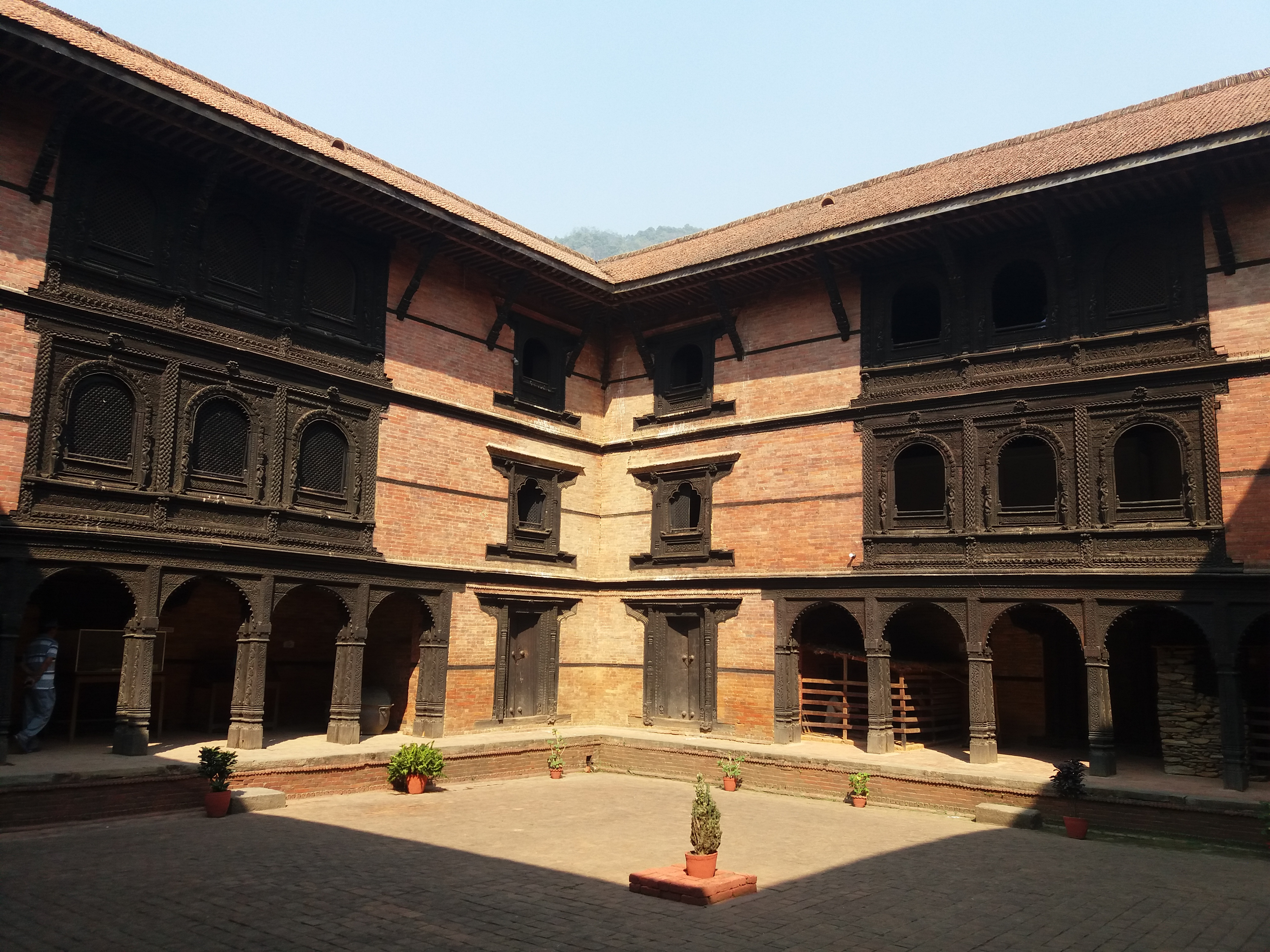
Gorkha Palace, the ancestral seat of the Shah Kings

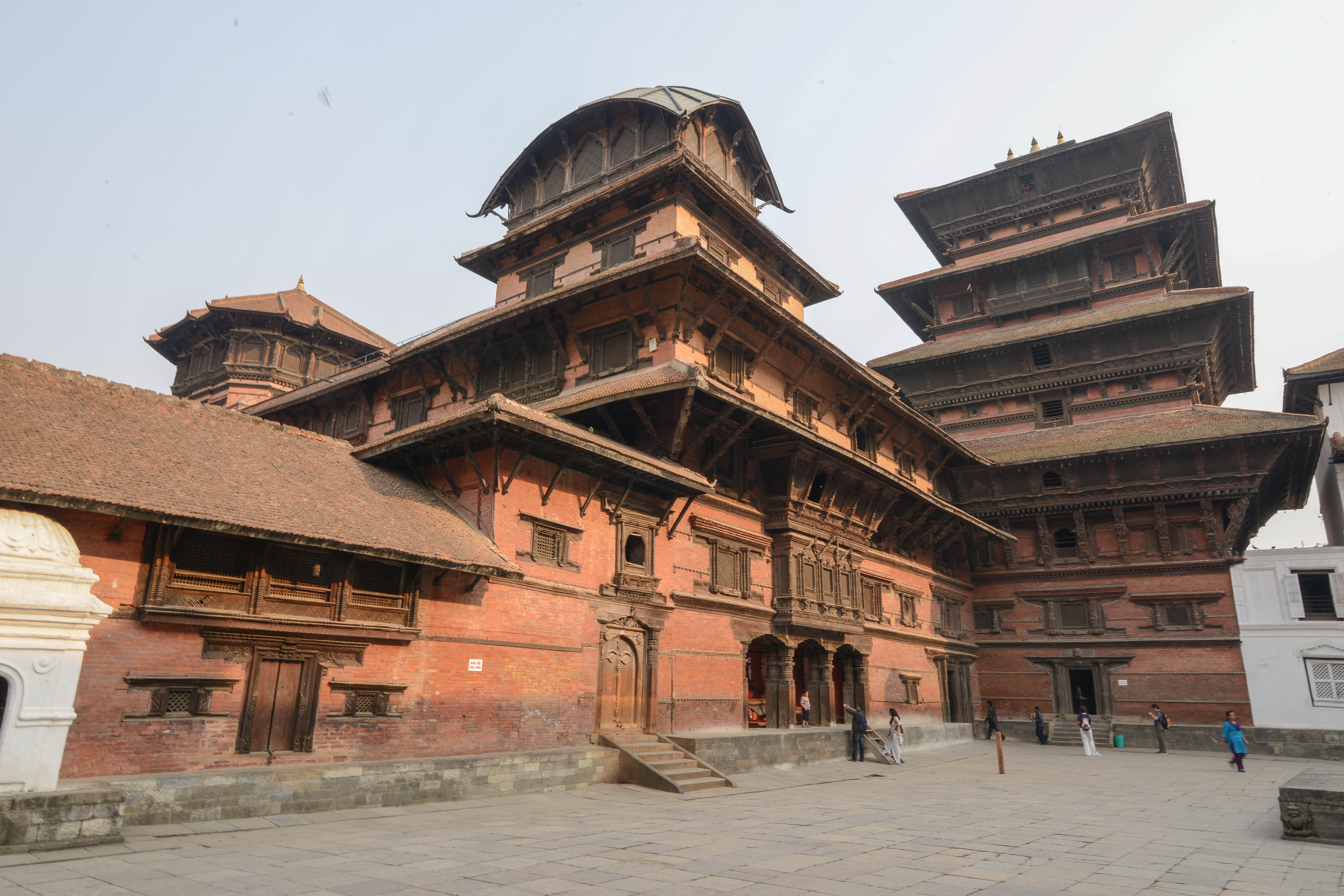
Kathmandu Durbar Square, the old royal palace of Kathmandu

Phulpati (फूलपाती) is celebrated on the seventh day of Dashain. Phulpati is made up of two words: phūl (flower) and pātī (leaf).

On this day the national Phulpati (the kalasha, banana stalks, Jamara, and sugar cane tied with red cloth) is brought to the capital by Magars from Gorkha – a three-day walk, about 169 kilometres (105 miles) from the Kathmandu Valley. Hundreds of formally-dressed government officials, diplomats and high ranking military and police personnel gather on the Tundikhel ground for the official event of "Phulpati Badai (फूलपाती बढाइँ)". The President, as guest of honor, attends the ceremony at Tundikhel. On its grounds, the Nepali Army fires a 10 to 15-minutes of feu de joie and a 21-gun salute, followed by a military parade in honor of the event, and the Phulpati parade of Gurujyuko Platoon, army personnel, alongside a delegation of the Magars, marches past the president, leaving the grounds to the Dashain Ghar in Hanuman Dhoka to be anointed.

Since 2008, when the royal family was overthrown and Nepal was proclaimed a republic, the two-century-old tradition has changed and the Phulpati goes to the residence of the president rather than at the royal palaces wherein it was formerly received by the royal family. The president assumed the king's social and religious roles after the end of the monarchy, in addition to being commander-in-chief of the army, inclusive of his attendance of the principal ceremony of the day. The Phulpati parade at Tundikhel is still held as an expression of army loyalty to Nepali traditions and culture.

In other cities and towns across Nepal and India, a Phulpati procession takes place. Flowers, fruit and holy symbols are tied in a red cloth, which is covered with a red shawl and carried on a decorated log. Townspeople offer flowers and fruit as the procession passes their houses, accompanied by traditional Naumati instruments.

== Day 8 ==
=== Maha Asthami (महाअष्टमी) ===
The eighth day is called Maha Asthami. This is the day when the most fierce of Goddess Durga's manifestations, the Kali, is appeased through the sacrifice of buffaloes, goats, hens, and ducks in temples throughout the nation. Blood, symbolic of its fertility, is offered to the Goddesses. Appropriately enough, the night of this day is called Kal Ratri (Black Night), after the form of Durga worshipped on this day. It is also the norm for buffaloes to be sacrificed in the courtyards of all the land revenue offices in the country on this day. The old palace in Kathmandu Durbar Square, as well as the presidential palace, is active throughout the night with worship and sacrifices in almost every courtyard.

On midnight of the very day of the Dashain, a total of 54 buffaloes and 54 goats are sacrificed in observance of the rites. After the offering of the blood, the meat is taken home and cooked as "prasad", or food blessed by divinity. This food is offered in tiny leaf plates to the household gods, and then distributed amongst the family. Eating this food is thought to be auspicious. While the puja is being carried out, great feasts are held in the homes of common people. On this day the Newar People has an event called "Khadga Puja" where they do puja of their weapons. It is when they put on tika and get blessings from elders.

== Day 9 ==
=== Maha Navami (महानवमी) ===
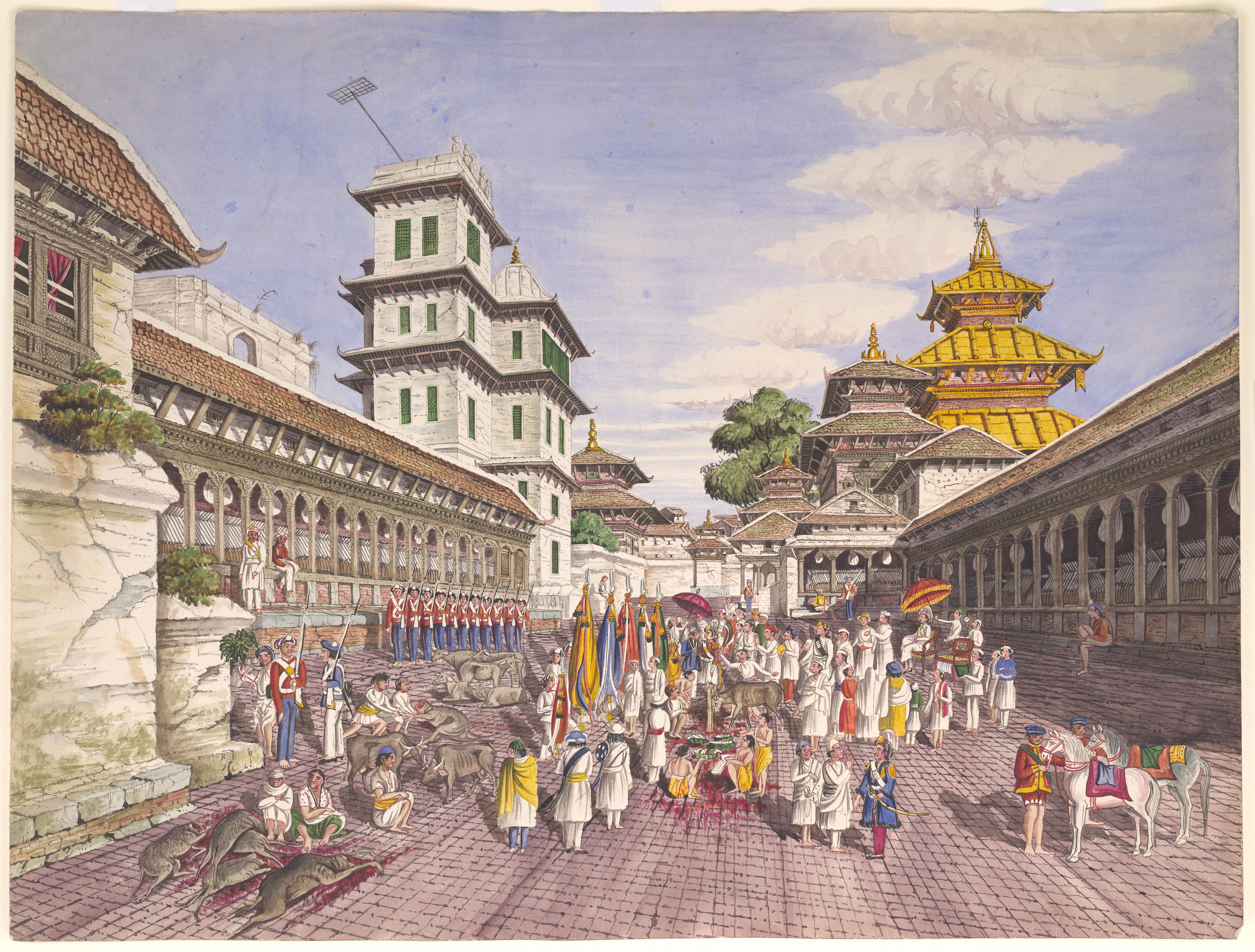
A Maha Navami celebration in 1856

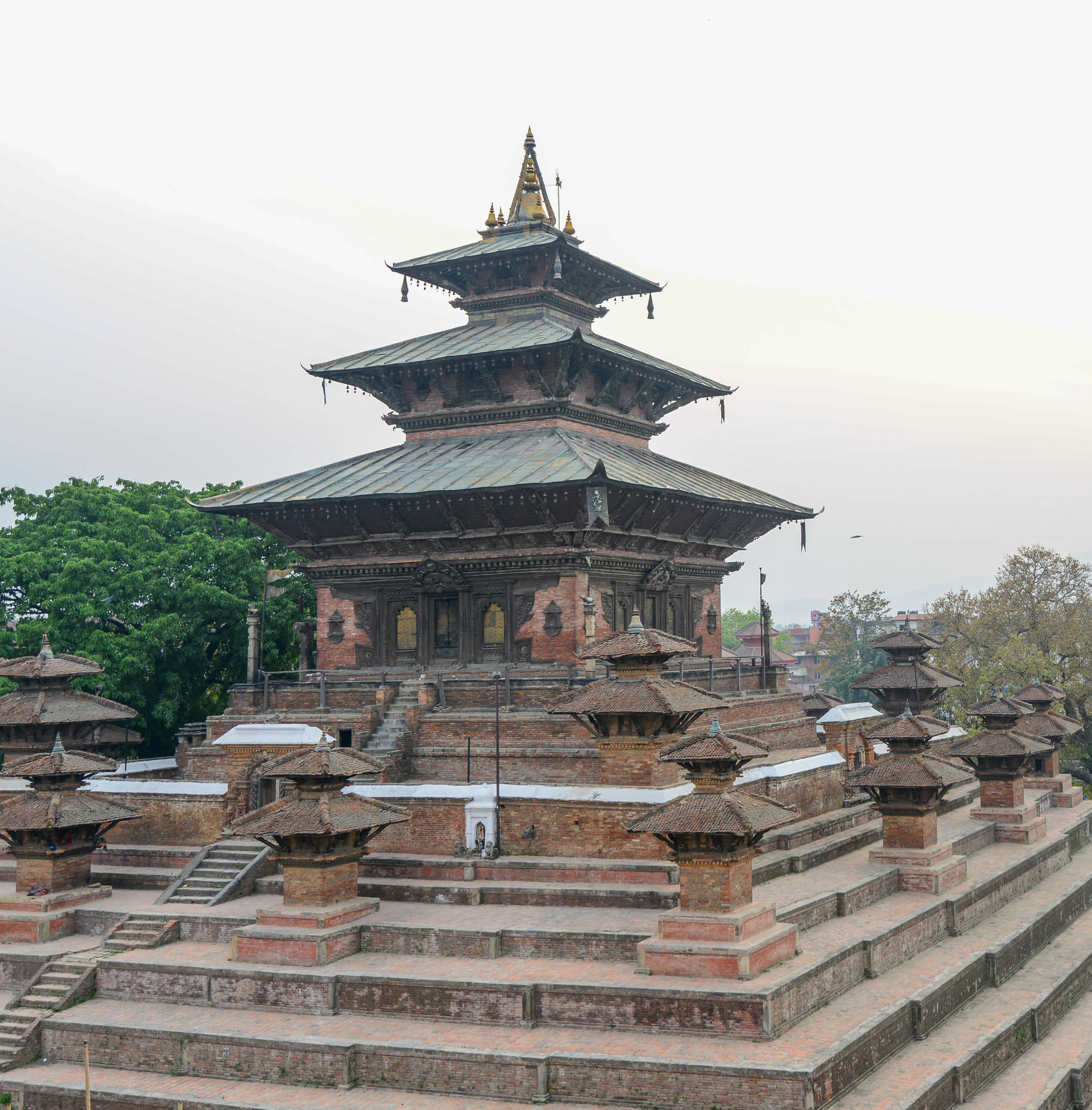
Taleju Temple is open to the public only on Maha Navami

The ninth day of Dashain is Maha Navami, "the great ninth day". The last day of Navaratri, on that day ceremonies and rituals reach a peak. On this day, official ritual sacrifices of the Nepal Armed Forces are held in both one of the Hanuman Dhoka royal palaces, the Kot courtyard grounds, and in the presidential palace yard, at the same time, a 21-gun salute is fired again in honor of the festivities.

On Maha Navami, Durga is celebrated. Artisans, craftsmen, traders, drivers and mechanics worship and offer animal and fowl blood to their tools, equipment, vehicles and aircraft. Uniformed organizations perform similar offerings to weapons, equipment, vehicles and others. The Taleju Temple gates are opened to the general public only on this day, and thousands of devotees pay their respects to the goddess by the thousands, inclusive of people coming from across the nation.

== Day 10 ==
=== Bijaya Dashami (बिजयादशमी) ===
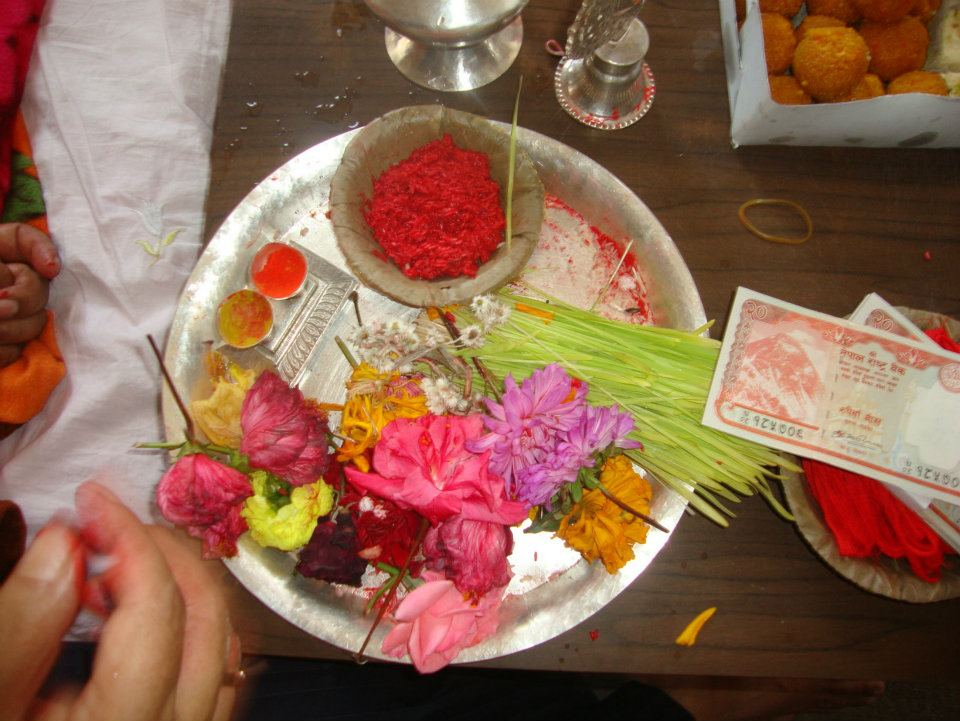
The Tika (red) and jamara (green) used during Dashain

The tenth day of the festival is the Bijaya dashami, which celebrates the victory of Durga. On this day, a mixture of rice, yogurt and vermilion is prepared which is known as "tika". Dashain tika time differs by year. Elders put this tika and jamara on the forehead of younger relatives to bless them with abundance in the future in residences, with similar events in workplaces and even the Presidential palace. Red symbolizes the blood that ties the family and community together.

== Day 11 ==
=== Papakunsha Ekadashi (पापाङ्कुशा एकादशी) ===
Ekadashi is the eleventh day of the lunar fortnight in the Hindu calendar, and people usually fast, while others continue visiting relatives and receiving the tika from the day before. The day after Bijaya Dashami is known as Papakunsha Ekadashi (पापकुंश एकादशी). On this day, it is customary to listen to Papakunsha Ekadashi stories and visit religious sites. Donating objects such as gold, sesame, barley, grain, soil, umbrellas, and shoes on this day is believed to lead to heaven after death.

== Day 15 ==
=== Kojagrat Purnima (कोजाग्रत पूर्णिमा) ===
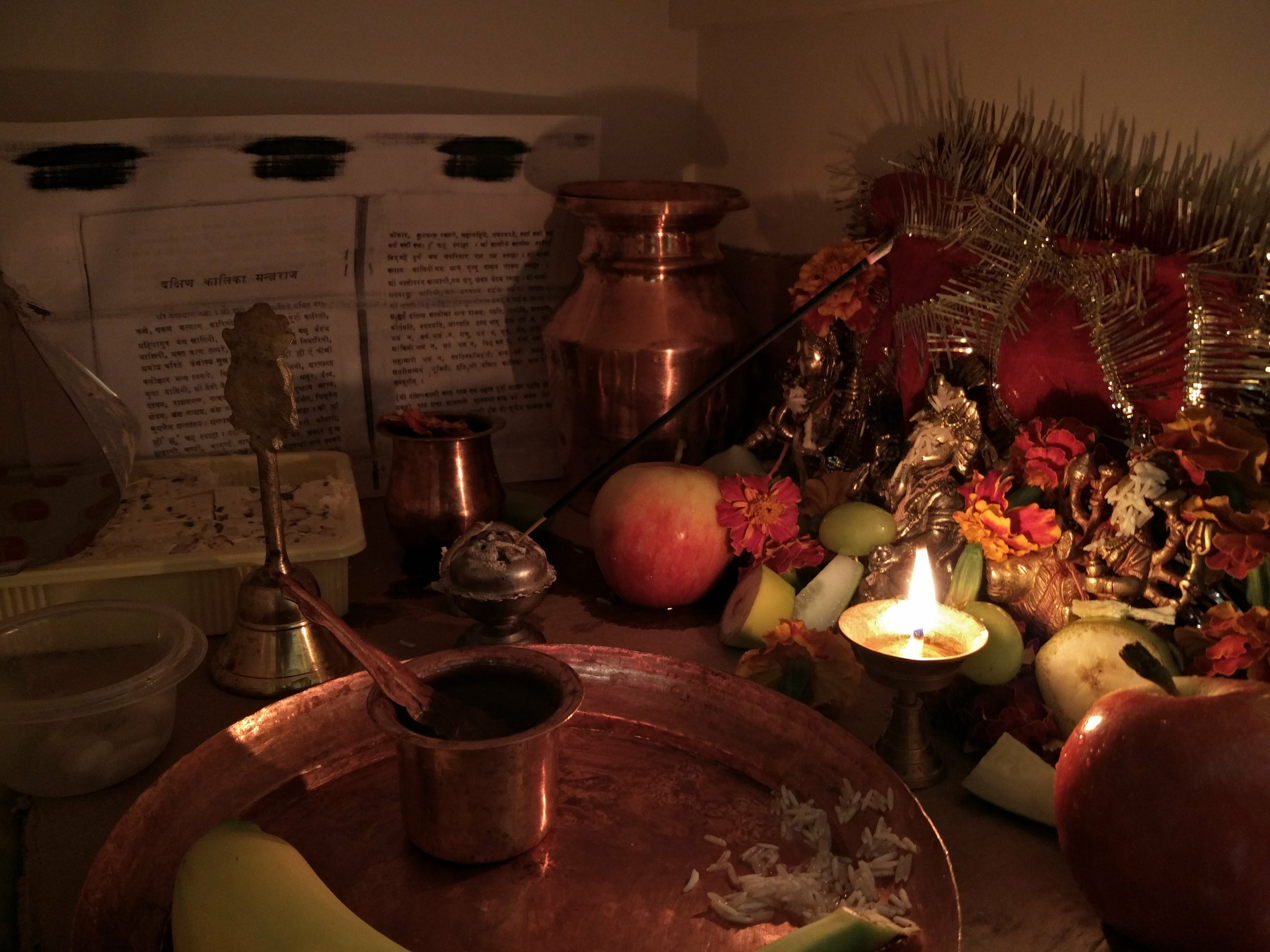
A Dashain ritual

The festival's last day, on the full-moon day, is known as Kojagrat Purnima (कोजाग्रत पूर्णिमा) or Sharad Purnima. The literal meaning of Kojagrat is "who is awake". Lakshmi, the goddess of wealth, is worshipped because it is believed that she descends to earth and showers whoever is awake all night with prosperity. Activities that night include playing cards.

Animal sacrifice is common, as the festival commemorates the bloody battles between divine and demonic powers. Proponents interpret it as the symbolic sacrifice of animal qualities, and those opposed to animal sacrifice call it an excuse to satisfy the appetite for meat.

== Related traditions ==
=== Music ===
Malshree dhoon has been incorporated into mainstream Nepalese music as the music of Dashain, announcing that the festival has begun. It is some of the oldest surviving Newa-language devotional music, originating in the 17th century.

=== Mantras ===
While putting tikas on younger family members, elders usually recite Sanskrit mantras as a blessing. Two main mantras are recited while applying tikas on Bijaya Dashami: one for men and one for women.

In the male mantra, the qualities of mythical Hindu heroes (such as Yudhishthira and Balarama) and antiheroes (Ashwatthama and Duryodhana) are extolled.

Mantra for men and boys
IAST	English translation
Āyu Droṇasute śreyaṃ Daśarathe śatrukṣayeṃ Rāghave Aiśvaryaṃ Nahuṣe gatiścha Pavane mānaṃ cha Duryodhane Dānaṃ Sūryasute balaṃ Haladhare satyaṃ cha Kuntīsute Vijñānaṃ Vidure bhavantu bhavatāṃ kīrtiścha Nārāyaṇe	May you have a long life as the son of Drona (Ashwatthama) May you be as fortunate as Dasharatha May you defeat all your enemies as Raghava May you have the grandeur of Nahusha May you have the speed of Pavana (wind) May you be as respected as Duryodhana May you be giving as the son of Surya (Karna) May you have the strength of the plough wielder (Balarama) May you be truthful as the son of Kunti (Yudhishthira) May you have the intelligence of Vidura May you have the glory of Narayana

The female mantra worships women as various form of goddess Durga.

Mantra for women and girls
IAST	English translation
Jayanti Maṅgalā Kālī Bhadrakālī Kapālinī Durgā Kṣamā Śivā Dhātrī Svāhā Svadhā Namokastute	I bow before thee, who exists in various forms as Jayanti, Mangalā, Kāli, Bhadrakāli, Kapalini, Durgā, Kshāma, Shivā, Dhatri, Svāhā and Svadhā.

In addition to these mantras, other blessings for good health and fortune are given.

=== Games and carnivals ===
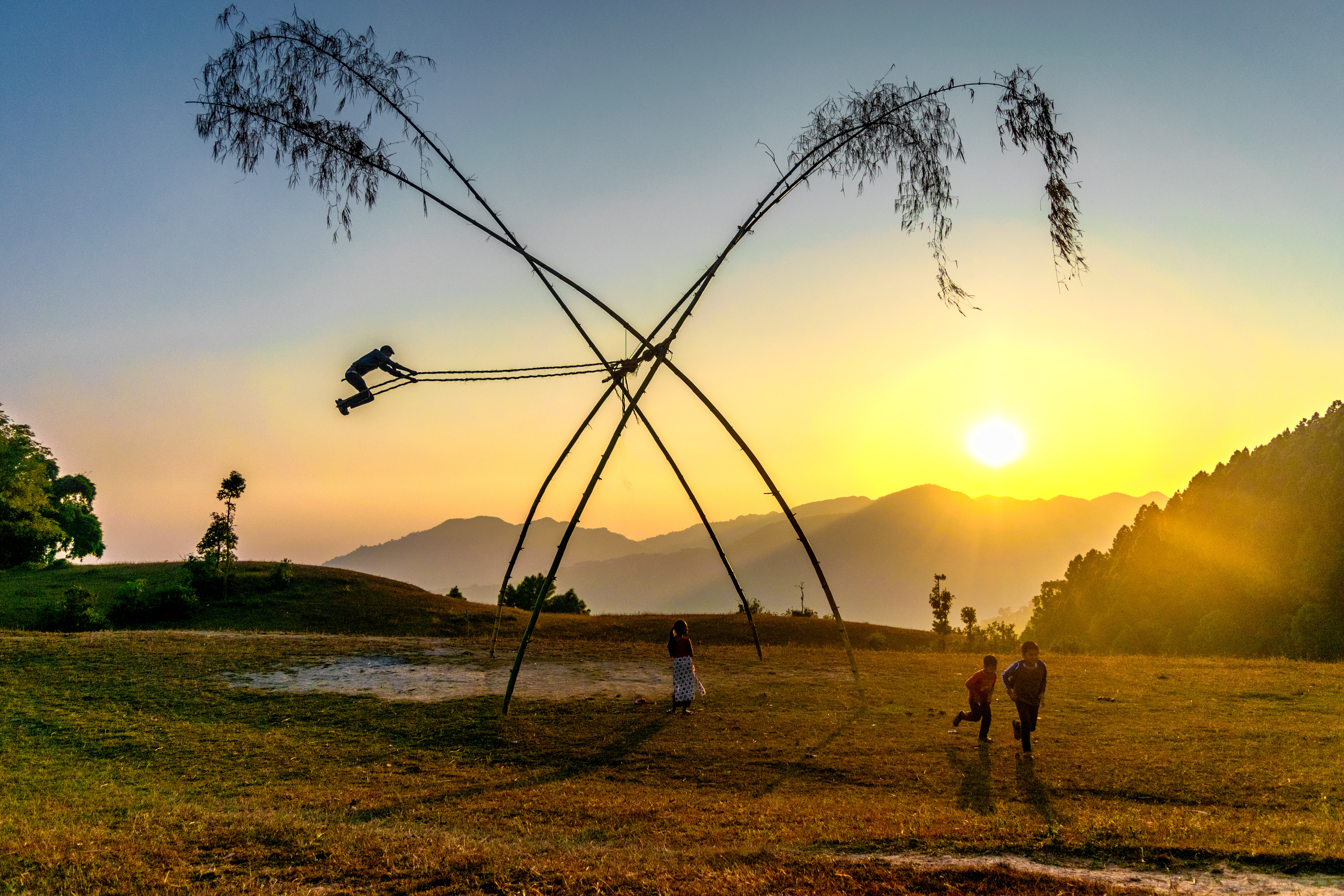
Children on a traditional Dashain swing (Linge Ping) in Palpa, Nepal in 2019

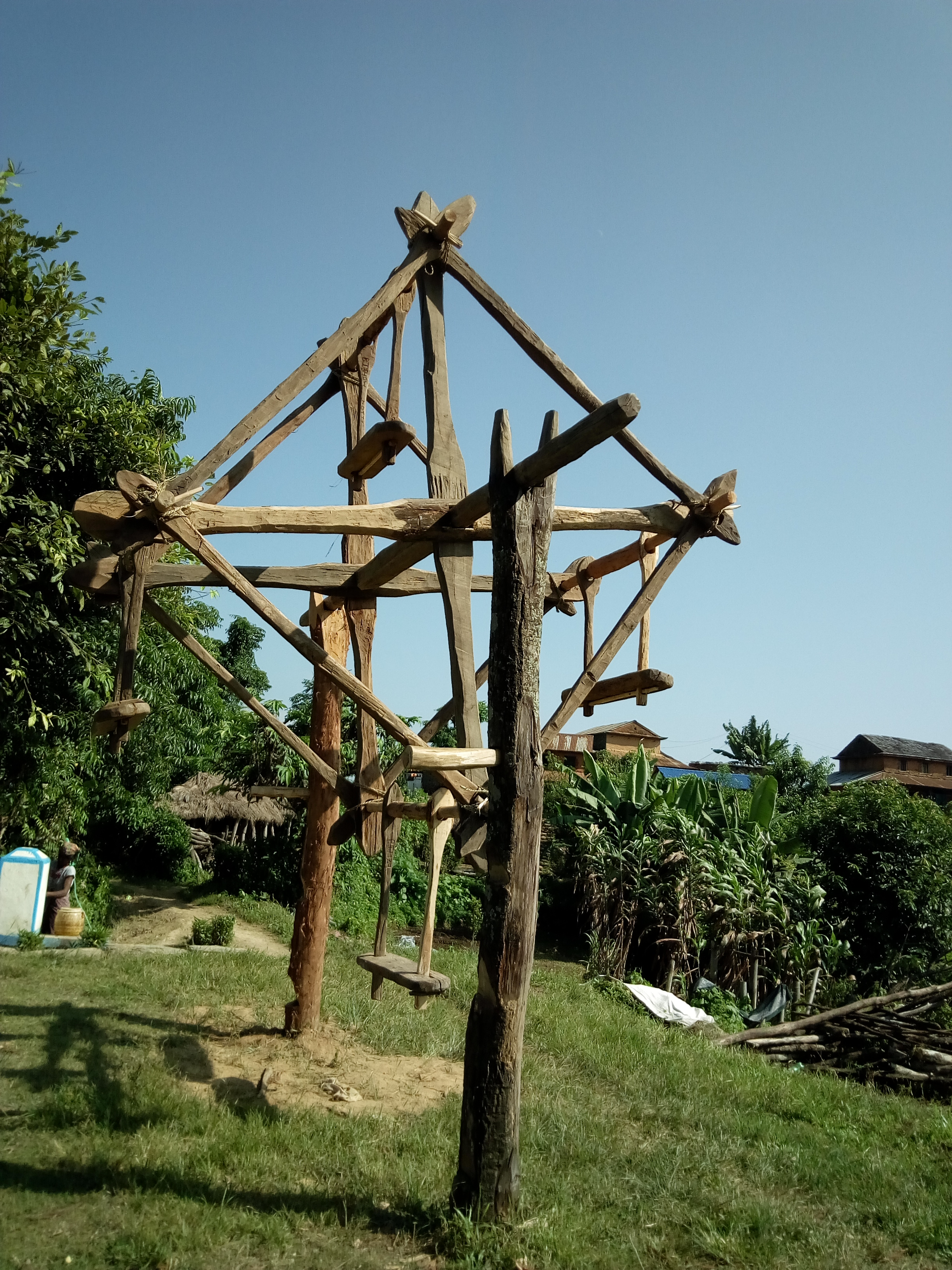
A wooden Ferris wheel (Pirke Ping)

As Dashain approaches, kite-flying becomes more common. Kites are considered one way of reminding God to stop sending rain. During the festival, people of all ages fly kites from their roofs. Colourful kites and voices shouting "changā chet" (when a person cuts another's kite string) fill the days. Playing cards is another way of celebrating Dashain.

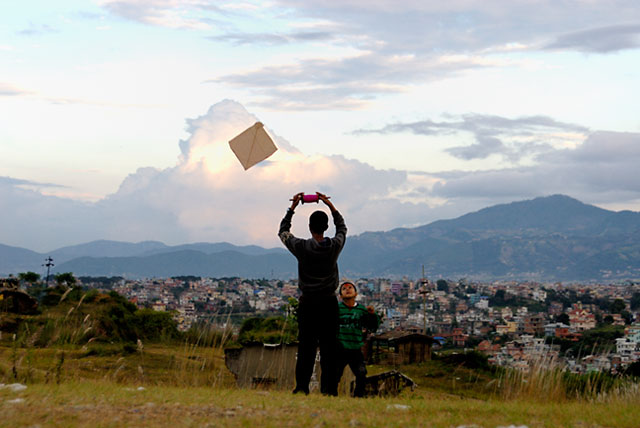
Kites are flown during Dashain.

Bamboo swings are built in many parts of the country, and Dashain swings are known as ping in Nepali. The swings, made with traditional methods, are normally constructed a week before Ghatasthapana – the first day of Navratri – and dismantled after the festival of Tihar (which follows Dashain). The height of some swings exceeds twenty feet, and they are especially popular with children.

Fairs and celebrations are organized during the festival. Small village fairs have Ferris wheels for children and other entertainment for adults. In the city, commercial fairs and celebrations are usually held.

=== Shopping ===
Buying and wearing new clothes is an important part of Dashain. New clothes are also the major activity during Dashain for many Nepalese Household. Almost all shops have festival discounts, and clothing has its highest sales during the festival.

=== Feasts ===
Thousands of animals, including buffalo, ducks, and rams, are slaughtered during Dashain every year. It is believed that the goddesses are appeased by the sacrifices. Almost all the temples, especially the Durga and Kali temples, receive thousands of sacrifices. Ashtami and Navami are the days when the sacrifices peak. Thousands of animals are sacrificed to appease the goddesses, and people also slaughter animals for feasts. Since many feasts and gatherings are organized throughout the festival's fifteen days, demand for meat increases considerably.

== Dashain abroad ==
=== Bhutan ===
Dashain was declared a national holiday in Bhutan in 1980. It is celebrated by the country's Hindu community, and is a major Lhotshampa festival. The king of Bhutan offers the Dashain tika to representatives of the Hindu community at the Devi Panchayan Mandir in Thimphu every year, and tika and royal blessings are sent to other dzongkhags across the country. The king also offers prayers to Durga at the Hindu temple. White tika is used.

=== India ===
Dashain is celebrated by Nepali-speaking communities in Darjeeling, Sikkim and Assam. A red tika is used. Nepalese people working in India return en masse during the festival, causing congestion in border areas.

=== Myanmar ===
Myanmar has a Nepali-speaking population of about 100,000 people. Fewer animal sacrifices are made during Dashain, and tika is traditionally offered to descendants of the Konbaung dynasty. Kite-flying is uncommon.

== Issues ==
=== Animal welfare critiques ===
Many animals and birds are ritually slaughtered during the festival. This practice has drawn opposition from the local and international animal rights organizations.

=== Anti-Hindu criticism ===
Following the abolition of the Shah monarchy in 2008 and the transition to a secularism from world's last Hindu kingdom, some political organisations and activist groups associated with Hill Janajati communities began criticizing the nationwide celebration of Dashain, viewing it as a symbol of Hindu cultural dominance. Some groups organized boycotts or promoted applying a black tika on Bijaya Dashami instead of the traditional red or white tika as a form of protest, among those the Mongol National Organisation of Nepal is wildly viewed as a leading organization associated with this opposition.

Senior leaders of the Shram Sanskriti Party, such as Aaren Rai, Dhurbaraj Rai, and Harka Rai have also publicly criticized Hindus and their festivals, including Dashain. However, these campaigns have had a limited impact on overall public participation. Dashain remains deeply rooted in Nepalese society as a major social, cultural, and family festival, celebrated not only by Hindus but also by other religious communities.

== See also ==
- Mohani
- List of Hindu festivals in Nepal
