= National Day of Bhutan =

Annual observance (December 17)

- Official name: National Day of Bhutan
- Also called: Gyalyong Düchen
- Observed by: Bhutan
- Type: National
- Significance: The Day commemorates the anniversary of the coronation of Ugyen Wangchuck as the first Druk Gyalpo of Bhutan in 1907 at the Pungthang Dewa Chhenbi Phodrang.
- Date: 17 December
- Next time: 17 December 2026
- Frequency: Annual

National Day of Bhutan (Dzongkha: རྒྱལ་ཡོངས་དུས་ཆེན་; Wylie: rgyal yongs dus chen) known as Gyalyong Düchen is a major national event celebrated annually on 17 December in the Kingdom of Bhutan. The day holds significant importance in the history of Bhutan. December 17 marks the anniversary of the coronation of Ugyen Wangchuck as the first Druk Gyalpo of Bhutan in 1907 at Pungthang Dewa Chhenbi Phodrang. This event signifies the establishment of the hereditary monarchy and the unification of Bhutan under Wangchuck dynasty.

However, the national day was first celebrated on 17 December, 1971.

== Significance ==
The day is a public holiday in Bhutan, and all government offices and institutions are closed to commemorate the historic occasion. All Bhutanese take pride in celebrating the day. The day celebrates the establishment of the monarchy in Bhutan and honours the sacrifices made by past monarchs for the nation's sovereignty and prosperity. Therefore, the day is considered a tribute to the monarchs who shaped the nation and also a celebration of unity. It is a day for Bhutanese to renew their pledge to serve the Tsa-Wa-Sum and remain loyal to the Wangchuck Dynasty.

== History ==
Bhutan was first unified by Zhabdrung Ngawang Namgyal, who reigned for 35 years in the 17th century. However, the death of Zhabdrung Rinpoche in 1651 followed instability in the country for 225 years. As a result, regional leaders engaged in a power struggle with internal conflicts and civil war. By late 19th century, as foretold by Guru Rinpoche’s prophecy, Ugyen Wangchuck, the Ponlop of Tongsa, rose to prominence and unified the nation. A petition to the Lhengye Zhungtshog was submitted by Drungpa Ugyen Dorji to establish monarchy in Bhutan with Gongsar Ugyen Wangchuck as the first hereditary king. The Dratshang Lhentshog and Lhengye Zhungtshog endorsed the proposal.

On 17 December 1907, Gongsar Ugyen Wangchuck was unanimously crowned as the first hereditary King of Bhutan. Since then, the country has been united under one leadership.

However, it was only on 17 December 1971, 64 years after the coronation of the first king, Ugyen Wangchuck, that national day was observed for the first time.

== Celebration ==
Since the very first celebration in 1971, the day have been observed annually across the country. An archival footage of the 1979 national day celebration in Pema Gatshel emphasises the Bhutan's cultural history.

The main event usually take place in Thimphu, the capital city of Bhutan. Celebrations are held across the country and also among the Bhutanese living abroad. The celebrations include an address to the nation by the Druk Gyalpo. and the raising of the national flag at Tashichho Dzong in Thimphu. It also include the procession of the statue of the late King Ugyen Wangchuck to honour him and the independence of Bhutan.

=== 2024 Celebrations ===
His Majesty the King Jigme Khesar Namgyel Wangchuck graced the 117th national day celebrations at the Changlimithang Stadium. The Fourth Druk Gyalpo, other royal family members, more than 20,000 people, including over 200 international guests also attended the event. The event commenced with the reception of the king in a traditional chipdrel ceremony, hoisting of Bhutan’s national flag and an address to the nation by the king. The celebration continued with events highlighting Bhutan's vibrant culture. The 117th national day also marked the first-ever civil parade to celebrate the country's unsung heroes like the roadside workers, firefighters, social workers, telecom and space workers, and honesty teams for their important contributions to the nation-building. The day ended with a Tashi Labey.

The Bhutanese community in Australia also celebrated the national day. The celebration began with a chipdrel procession, listening to the king’s speech live from Changlimithang, followed by various cultural performances and awards. The national day was also celebrated at Chandigarh University. Bhutanese diaspora in the U.S. also joined the celebration.

== See also ==
- Ugyen Wangchuck
- Culture of Bhutan
- Emblem of Bhutan
- National Symbols of Bhutan
- Public holidays in Bhutan
