= Parinirvana Day =

Mahayana Buddhist holiday celebrated in East Asia

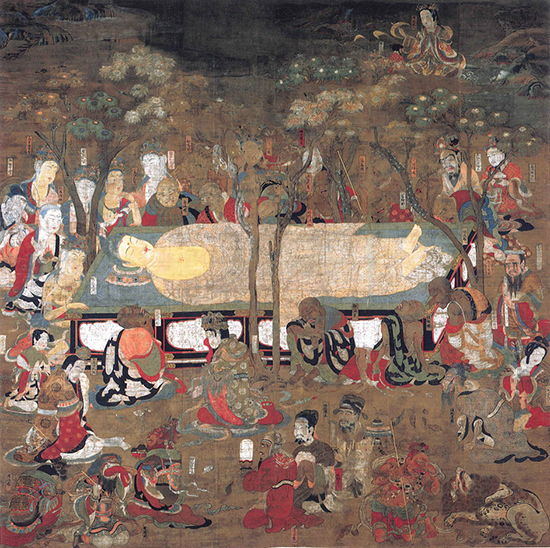
- Hanging scroll depicting Buddha's Nirvana
- Also called: Nirvana Day
- Observed by: Buddhists
- Significance: Day when the Buddha is said to have achieved Parinirvana, or complete Nirvana, upon the death of his physical body
- Date: 8 February or 15 February
- Frequency: annual

Parinirvana Day or Nirvana Day is a Mahayana Buddhist holiday celebrated in East Asia, Vietnam and the Philippines. By some it is celebrated on 8 February, but by most on 15 February. In Bhutan, it is celebrated on the fifteenth day of the fourth month of the Bhutanese calendar. It celebrates the day when the Buddha is said to have achieved Parinirvana, or complete Nirvana, upon the death of his physical body.

Passages from the recitations of Nibbana Sutta or Nirvana Sutra describing the Buddha's last days of life are often read on Parinirvana Day. Other observances include meditation and visits to Buddhist temples and monasteries. Also, the day is a time to think about one's own future death and on the deaths of loved ones. This thought process reflects the Buddhist teachings on impermanence.

Some Western Buddhist groups also celebrate Parinirvana Day.
