= Lhabab Duchen =

Buddhist festival

Lha Bab Düchen ལྷ་བབས་དུས་ཆེན
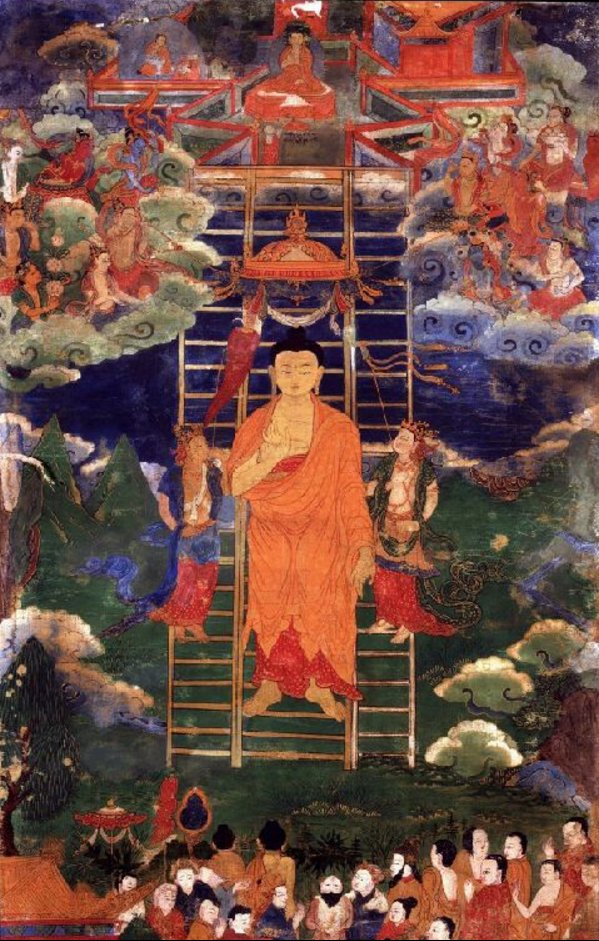
- Buddha's descent to the human realm from the Heaven of the Thirty-Three, Mongolia (18th century)
- Observed by: Tibet, Bhutan, Sikkim
- Type: Buddhist
- Date: 22nd day of the 9th lunar month
- Related to: Vap Full Moon Poya (in Sri Lanka); Tak Bat Devo (in Thailand); Boun Suang Huea (in Laos) Thadingyut Festival (in Myanmar)

- Lha Bab Düchen

Tibetan name
- Tibetan: ལྷ་བབས་དུས་ཆེན
Transcriptions
- Wylie: Lha-babs Dus-chen

Lha Bab Düchen (Tibetan: ལྷ་བབས་དུས་ཆེན་, Wylie: lha babs (divine descent) dus chen (great time)) is one of the four major Buddhist festivals commemorating four events in the life of Gautama Buddha. Lha Bab Düchen occurs on the 22nd day of the 9th Tibetan lunar month and celebrates Buddha's return to the human realm after teaching his mother for three months in the God's realm. It is widely celebrated in Buddhist Asian countries including Tibet, Bhutan, Sri Lanka, Myanmar, Thailand and Laos, where the celebration corresponds to local calendars.

Lha Bab Duchen is an annual Buddhist festival celebrated to observe the Buddha's return from the God's realm, known as Indra's realm of the Heaven of the Thirty-Three. Also called Trāyastriṃśa heaven, he went there to repay his mother Mayadevi's kindnesses by preaching to her and to the gods. Mayadevi attained arhatship.

According to events in the Buddha's life, the Buddha had ascended the Gods realm at the age of 45 in order to give teachings to his mother, who had been reborn in Indra's God realm. His ascent was accomplished by the lowering of the mountain summits to lift him to the teaching place. The Kangyur describes his seat "as a gleaming white stone surrounded by a beautiful grove of trees".

He taught continuously for three months to repay her kindnesses, while also benefiting the gods in that realm. The Buddha was then exhorted by his disciple and representative Maudgalyayana to return to the human realm, and after a long debate under a full moon the Buddha agreed to return.

He returned to the human realm a week later, after descending a celestial ladder surrounded by rainbows and celestial devotees. The special triple ladder was manifested by the gods Indra and Brahma, and the Buddha landed at Sankassa, India, which is counted among the Eight Great Places in the Buddha's life. Other sources credit Viswakarma, the Hindu-Buddhist god of machines, with the ladder. According to the Mahamaya Sutra, awaiting his arrival in Sankassa were King Prasenajit and the Buddha's sangha.

The Buddha's descent on the celestial ladder is considered one of The Eight Great Events in the Life of Buddha.

On Lha Bab Duchen, the effects of positive or negative actions are multiplied ten million times. It is part of Tibetan Buddhist tradition to engage in virtuous activities and prayer on this day.

== See also ==
- Abhidhamma Day

== Notes ==
During this day, positive or negative actions are multiplied 100 million times.
