= 2011 Bhutanese local elections =

The Bhutanese local government elections of 2011 were originally slated for 2008, but were delayed until 2011. Elections began on January 20, 2011, however polls opened in only 3 of 20 districts – Thimphu, Chukha District (Phuentsholing), and Samdrup Jongkhar – as part of a staggered election schedule. Polls closed June 27, 2011. Ahead of elections, 1,042 chiwogs, the basis of Bhutan's single-constituency electoral scheme, were slated to elect the leadership of Dzongkhag, Gewog, and Thromde governments.

Candidates for local elections in Bhutan must not belong to any political party, must not be registered clergy, and must meet the residency, character, and other requirements of Bhutanese election laws. Campaigns for local elections were not publicly funded, and candidates were limited to a campaign budget of Nu.50,000 (about USD 1,130). During this election cycle, Bhutan implemented a forum-style campaigns for the first time, reportedly with success. Previously, candidates campaigned at gatherings that each called individually.

== Results ==
On June 28, 2011, the Election Commission announced the preliminary results of the local government elections. It reported a voter turnout of 56%, electing 1,104 representatives at various levels from among 2,185 candidates. The initial report disclosed "a few" cases of mismatched voter rolls and voter identification cards, and stated that in 135 of these cases, the problems were rectified. It also mentioned that some votes had been improperly cast in voters' former domiciles and were rejected. The report further described 4 candidate disqualifications under the election laws, as well as a total of 16 election disputes, of which 3 were appealed to the Election Commission. Overall, elections were reported to have gone smoothly, and several international observers were allowed access.

On July 8, 2011, the Election Commission released detailed election results indicating 194,952 of 347,938 registered voters had cast ballots. Postal ballots constituted just over 19,000 of those eligible, however only some 16,000 were validly returned. The Commission reported that 165 female candidates ran among a total of 2,185 eligible, (7.5%); 76 women were among the 1,102 candidates elected to office (7%). One woman was elected gup, 12 were elected mangmi, 61 were elected gewog tshogpa, and 2 as thromde tshogpa.

According to Bhutanese media, local elections were particularly marked by voter apathy and distrust, leading to lackluster campaign gatherings and poor turnout during elections.

=== Delayed results ===
Due to a lack of candidates contesting seats, a total of 373 vacancies remained after local government elections. These vacancies included 3 for gup, 1 for mangmi, 360 for gewog tshogpa, 8 for dzongkhag thromde thuemi, and 1 for thromde tshogpa.

As a further complication, gup polls in Goenshari Gewog (Punakha) and tshogpa polls in Sherabling Chiwog of Chhudzom Gewog (Sarpang) resulted in equal votes among rival candidates.

The Election Commission also disclosed on July 8, 2011, that it had discovered seven elected candidates were in fact ineligible because they did not meet the age requirement (between 25 and 65). As a result, the Commission quashed the elections for gup of Bjacho Gewog (Chhukha), for tshogpa of Nyechhu Shar-ri Chiwog in Tsento Gewog (Paro), Gyalgong Chiwog in Silambi Gewog (Mongar), Langchhenphug Chiwog in Langchenphu Gewog (Samdrup Jongkhar), Ramtogtog Tsangrina Chiwog in Chang Gewog (Thimphu), Lemphang Chiwog in Bidung Gewog (Trashigang), and Chaling Chiwog in Shongphu Gewog (Trashigang).

The Commission pronounced penalties against elections personnel in nine districts due to their negligence in failing to follow guidelines and detect candidate ineligibility. It also announced that further elections would be held in the near future to address quashed results, ties, and remaining vacancies. The August 12 reelection in Goenshari was announced on August 1; campaigning recommenced until August 10.

Reelections in Goenshari Gewog were conducted August 12, 2011, from 09:00 until 17:00. Ahead of polling, Commission personnel reported high expectations. The democratic process again performed: despite the discouraging disqualifications, long journeys to polling stations, and decreased voter turnout in Goenshari from 382 to 323, the rerun proved hotly contested and was won by Kinley Dorji by a narrow 16 votes.

== Background ==
The Local Government Act of Bhutan 2009 is the latest legislation on local governments, establishing Dzongkhags as districts for national representation, each with their own locally-governing counsels; Gewogs as divisions of Dzongkhags, themselves with locally-governing counsels; and Thromdes as municipal governments. It also provides that all governments be elected by single-member constituencies, called chiwogs. The members of each level of local government – Dzongkhag, Gewog, and Thromde – must meet requirements and follow procedures defined by the Constitution, election laws, and rules of the Election Commission. While candidates for local elections need not possess a formal university degree, they must be functionally literate and adequately skilled. Notably, candidates must be natural-born citizens born of two Bhutanese parents, pass a functional literacy and skills test, obtain a security clearance, make extensive personal, financial, and professional disclosures, and formally prove they have no current party affiliation. Those with former affiliations must deregister. As part of local elections, candidates also choose a symbol and appear on a list published by the Returning Officer.

Between 2008 and 2011, delayed and staggered elections for local level government has resulted in an inability to form quora on the Dzongkhag, Gewog, and Thromde levels. Although elections were originally slated for 2008, various participatory hurdles, demarcation problems, and legal questions posed by the Election Commission regarding the constitutionality of laws on local governments produced significant delays. Although demarcation is a basic requisite for the determination of electoral rolls, the task presented particular difficulty for the government.

Between 2008 and 2011, recruitment and retention of Tshogpas (local government council members) and Thrompons (mayors) remained a serious issue. Obstacles range from lack of interest and economic incentives to difficulty in compliance and obtaining accreditation under existing election laws. The functional literacy and skills test alone left many constituencies without the minimum of two candidates, leading to lengthy delay of the local government elections of 2011, originally slated for 2008. Women elected to office remained relatively few (14% before local elections according to the UNHCR), more than half of voters in initial local government elections were women. In initial local-level voting in 2011, voter turnout was about 50%.

In contrast many lay monks and former lay monks, facing constitutional legal hurdles in voting as well as registering and certifying as candidates, have actively sought to participate in elections and government since democratization.

On March 16, 2011, the Election Commission conducted the second round of the skills test to determine those eligible for the local government elections. Out of 1,502 registrants, 1,215 took the test and 1,135 passed, leaving a pass rate of 93%. Those who passed were certified to run for local offices.

== See also ==
- Elections in Bhutan
- Local Government Act of Bhutan 2009
