= Taxation in Bhutan =

Taxation in Bhutan is conducted by the national government and by its subsidiary local governments. All taxation is ultimately overseen by the Bhutan Ministry of Finance, Department of Revenue and Customs, which is part of the executive Lhengye Zhungtshog (cabinet). The modern legal basis for taxation in Bhutan derives from legislation. Several acts provide for taxation and enforcement only germane to their subject matter and at various levels of government, while a smaller number provide more comprehensive substantive tax law. As a result, the tax scheme of Bhutan is highly decentralized.

The duty to pay taxes is affirmed by the Constitution of 2008 individually as well as in commerce. The Constitution also confirms the ability of local governments to raise taxes in accordance to laws passed by Parliament. Under the Constitution, taxation is specifically disqualified as the subject of national referendums, leaving tax laws within the exclusive purview of Parliament.

== Individual and corporate taxation ==
Bhutanese law generally provides for individual and corporate taxation based on income, sales, imports, and movable and immovable property.

Bhutan has regulated corporations since 1989, most recently under the Companies Act of 2000. These regulations include taxation of corporate income. As of 2011, Bhutan's Corporate Income Tax rate was 30 percent on net profits; in addition, the Business Income Tax was another 30 percent on net profits.

In 2000, Bhutan enacted its Sales Tax and Customs Excise Act. The Act sets forth the duty to pay sales tax and excises on goods and services within Bhutan as well as customs on imports according to rates and schedules published by the Ministry of Finance. The Act also provides Department of Revenue and Customs agents broad authority to inspect, confiscate, demand accounting, and to detain, fine, and prosecute those who contravene the tax laws. The Act also sets forth a procedural framework for resolving disputes, which may be appealed to the Royal Court of Justice.

The Income Tax Act of 2001 represents the first modern, comprehensive Act on income taxation in Bhutan, for both individuals and companies. The Act also provides for sales tax, bankruptcy, and administrative processes for hearing disputes. As of 2011, the Department of Revenue and Customs imposes no taxes on the first Nu.100,000 of income; taxes up to Nu.250,000 at 10%; up to Nu.500,000 at 15%; up to Nu.1,000,000 at 20%; and Nu.1,000,001 and above at 25%. In addition, property transfers are taxed at 5%. Rural taxes are also imposed on land, houses, and cattle. Other direct duties includes the motor vehicle tax, foreign travel tax, royalties, business and professional licenses, health contribution taxes, and municipal taxes.

As part of Bhutan's program of decentralization, local governments and municipalities – including dzongkhags, gewogs, and thromdes, have been authorized to collect property, services, and transactional taxes since at least 1991. Notably, the Local Government Act of 2009 allows thromdes (municipalities) to levy a separate tax on vacancy and underdevelopment.

Other legislation authorizes or imposes taxes against particular subject matter. For example, the Tobacco Control Act of 2010 requires persons importing tobacco to pay a tax and to furnish proof of payment upon demand. Like many such laws, the Tobacco Control Act defines a set of offenses and penalties for contravening its taxation provisions.

== Use of tax money ==
The government either allocates tax revenues for specific state expenditures or deposits them into a Consolidated Fund. The government uses the Consolidated Fund according to budgets passed by law, and may also make grants and investments for the public interest. The national budget is overseen by the Finance Minister, who reports regularly to the National Assembly.

The Pay Commission, an independent government body, establishes the pay rate and expenditure budget for members of government. Public expenditure of collected funds is governed by the Public Finance Act of 2007.

== Tax exemptions ==
Under the Constitution of Bhutan, the royal family receives annuities set by Parliament and is exempted from taxation.

Registered civil society organizations ("CSOs") are exempt from tax on income or other gains earned as a result of investing endowed property or other funds in accordance with regulations promulgated by the Department of Revenue and Customs. The two types of CSO, Public Benefit and Mutual Benefit Organizations, may be granted exemptions from customs duties or other taxes besides income taxes on a case-by-case basis under sets of regulations and procedures issued jointly by the Civil Society Organizations Authority and the Department of Revenue and Customs.

No customs or duties are levied on goods imported into Bhutan from India, as per the nations' Agreement on Trade and Commerce.

Foreign diplomatic missions, international organisations, and government agencies are generally exempted from paying customs duties and sales tax. Under the Sales Tax Act, the Ministry of Finance may also exempt any other person from sales, customs, and excise taxes at its discretion. Organizations exempt from customs duties must still pay sales tax when importing goods into Bhutan, however.

== Vehicle import tax controversy ==
Taxation has been a topic of controversy since democratization in Bhutan. In June 2010, the first democratically elected government of Bhutan revised the import duty scheme on imported light private vehicles, raising taxes without following the procedures for bicameral presentment and debate required by the Constitution. The move was supported by some Bhutanese as curbing congestion and pollution while promoting mass transit development. The National Assembly opposition party contested the action in the High Court of Bhutan, Constitutional Bench, winning the initial suit. On appeal to the Supreme Court of Bhutan, the Attorney General argued that the tax revision was supported by pre-constitutional laws on direct and indirect taxation that remained unrepealed. The Attorney General also argued against judicial reviewability of political actions, a position based largely in United States jurisprudence developed by Louis Brandeis and supported by American case law. In December 2010, while the lawsuit was pending, the government ordered a halt of all imports subject to the tax, a move the opposition criticized as contempt of court. On February 24, 2011, the Supreme Court unanimously affirmed the High Court ruling against the government. The government lifted the import ban in early March 2011 and stated its intention to refund the taxes it had collected illegally, although it may reintroduce the tax revisions and pass them in the constitutional process. The government, though shaken by the ruling, has declared it will not resign over the debacle.

After the controversy, the World Bank in its Financial Management Accountability Assessment warned that Bhutan's financial matters needed better legislative scrutiny. The World Bank cited inadequate examination and debate in Parliament before passing budgets, which include tax schedules. Furthermore, the World Bank decried the inability of Parliament to modify proposed budgets, but only to ratify proposals of the Ministry of Finance.

== History ==
During the reign of Zhabdrung Ngawang Namgyal (1594–1651), taxes in Bhutan were levied by penlops (regional governors). In 1865, Ashley Eden described the taxation in Bhutan as not so much a system as "squeez[ing] as much as possible out of the people under them." Modernly, governmental authority was fully consolidated in 1907 with the establishment of the Wangchuck dynasty and the modern state of Bhutan.

Before the 1960s, the Bhutanese government collected taxes in kind and in the form of "labor contribution". Taxes in kind were gradually phased out in favor of nominal monetized taxes on land, property, business income, and consumption of good and services.

In 1961, the National Assembly established the Gyaltse Kha Lowa (Accounts and Audit Committee) to oversee government revenue and properties. In 1968, the National Assembly made the Gyaltse Kha Lowa into the Ministry of Finance under the impetus of increasing development. In 1971, the Ministry saw the establishment of its Department of Customs, later to become the Department of Revenue and Customs, responsible for implementing much of the tax law.

In 1974, the Royal Government began experimenting with decentralization, devolving some governmental powers – including taxation – to the municipalities of Thimphu and Phuntsholing.

The Bhutanese government enacted major reforms to the tax structure in 1989 and again in 1992. The reforms of 1989 included Bhutan's first business income tax, replacing its previous 2% turnover tax; abolishing export and nuisance taxes; and exempting plant machinery from sales and import duties. The 1992 reforms aimed to simplify administrative procedures for compliance and transparency.

== See also ==
- Bhutanese legislation
  - Constitution of Bhutan
  - Local Government Act of Bhutan 2009
  - Tobacco Control Act
- Income tax
- Corporate tax
- Sales tax
- Property tax
