= Thromde =

Second-level administrative division in Bhutan

A Thromde (Dzongkha: ཁྲོམ་སྡེ་; Wylie: khrom-sde) is a second-level administrative division in Bhutan. The legal administrative status of thromdes was most recently codified under the Local Government Act of 2009, and the role of thromdes in elections in Bhutan was defined in the Election Act of 2008.

== Governance ==
Thromde administration is a product of the Bhutanese program of decentralization and devolution of power and authority. Thromdes are administered independently by a Thromde Tshogde if sufficiently developed and populated (Class A Thromdes); or directly by Dzongkhag Administration or the Gewog Administration as decided by the Government (Class B Thromdes and Yenlag Thromdes). From time to time, Parliament decides the boundaries of Thromde in consultation with the National Land Commission Secretariat and local authorities.

Each Thromde Tshogde is composed of seven to ten elected members and headed by a Thrompon. Thromde Tshogdes are empowered to regulate advertising, enforce public health and safety rules, and to levy taxes on land, property, property transfer (sales tax) and, "betterment." The municipal governments are also authorized to levy special taxes on vacant and underdeveloped land to encourage development, and to raise and spend money in to promote local economic development.

The administrations overseeing Class B Thromdes and Yenlag Thromdes are tasked with encouraging and overseeing their progressive development into Class A Thromdes – locally governed municipalities.

Although Class A and Class B Thromdes were established ahead of local elections in 2011, Yenlag Thromdes were to be declared only after the second parliamentary elections in 2013. This would be followed by another delimitation of the 16 Dzongkhag Thromdes (Class B) and a review of chiwog numbers and boundaries affected by the declaration of the Yenlag Thromdes. In 2015 a list was approved by parliament of updated Dzongkhag and Yenlag Thromdes boundaries. As of 2017 there are only four self-governing Thromdes (Dzongkhag Thromde class A): Thimphu, Phuentsholing, Gelephu and Samdrup Jongkhar.

== History ==
Under the Geog Yargay Tshochung of 2002, gewog administration included non-votingTshogpa, representatives of villages or village clusters. Through the enactment of the Act of 2009, gewogs were divided administratively into representatives by chiwogs, or village groups.

The Local Government Act of 2007 was the first piece of Bhutanese legislation to provide distinctions among thromdes, dividing them into two classes: Dzongkhag Thromdes, which lacked the developmental capacity to form administrations in their own right; and Gyelong Thromdes, which were independent, non-legislating municipalities administered by a Gyelyong Thromde Tshogdu (Gyelyong administration). Each Gyelong administration was headed by an Executive Secretary. The administrative role of Gyelong Thromde Tshogdus were largely analogous to later roles for more developed municipalities.

The Constitution of 2008 confirmed the status of thromdes, providing for Thromde Tshogdes as the most basic level of some local government administration; for other thromdes, administration was provided directly through Dzongkhag Thromde representation by one elected member from Dzongkhag Thromdes, and a second from Dzongkhag Yenlag Thromdes. The Constitution provided the basic legal framework for thromde administrations in the terms that continue today.

== List of Thromdes ==
The following is a list of thromdes by dzongkhag, gewog, and rank:

Dzongkhag	Gewog	Thromde	Rank
Bumthang	Chhoekhor ཆོས་འཁོར་	Jakar or Bumthang	Dzongkhag Thromde; Class B
Chhukha	Bjachho བྱག་ཕྱོགས་	Tsimasham	Yenlag Thromde
Chhukha	Phuentsholing ཕུན་ཚོགས་གླིང་	Phuentsholing	Dzongkhag Thromde; Class A
Chhukha	Sampheling བསམ་འཕེལ་གླིང་	Phuentsholing	Dzongkhag Thromde; Class A
Dagana	Goshi སྒོ་བཞི་	Daga or Dagana	Dzongkhag Thromde; Class B
Dagana	Lhamoy Zingkha སྒོ་བཞི་	Lhamoyzhingkha	Yenlag Thromde
Gasa	Khatoe ཁ་སྟོད་	Gasa	Dzongkhag Thromde; Class B
Gasa	Khatoe ཁ་སྟོད་	Damji	Yenlag Thromde
Haa	Katsho སྐར་ཚོགས་	Ha or Haa	Dzongkhag Thromde; Class B
Haa	Uesu དབུས་སུ་	Ha or Haa	Dzongkhag Thromde; Class B
Haa	Sama ས་དམར་་	Jyenkana	Yenlag Thromde
Lhuentse	Gangzur སྒང་ཟུར་	Lhuentse	Dzongkhag Thromde; Class B
Lhuentse	Tsenkhar སྒང་ཟུར་	Autsho	Yenlag Thromde
Mongar	Mongar མོང་སྒར་	Mongar	Dzongkhag Thromde; Class B
Mongar	Ngatshang སྔ་ཚང་	Yadi	Yenlag Thromde
Paro	Wangchang ཝང་ལྕང་	Paro	Dzongkhag Thromde; Class B
Pema Gatshel	Shumar ཤུ་མར་	Pemagatshel	Dzongkhag Thromde; Class B
Punakha	Guma གུ་མ་	Punakha	Dzongkhag Thromde; Class B
Punakha	Guma གུ་མ་	Lobeysa	Yenlag Thromde
Samdrup Jongkhar	Dewathang དབེ་བ་ཐང་	Samdrup Jongkhar	Dzongkhag Thromde; Class A
Samdrup Jongkhar	Dewathang དབེ་བ་ཐང་	Dewathang or Deothang (merged with Samdrup Jongkhar Thromde)	Yenlag Thromde
Samdrup Jongkhar	Phuentshothang ཕུན་ཚོགས་ཐང	Samdrupcholing	Yenlag Thromde
Samtse	Samtse བསམ་རྩེ་	Samtse	Dzongkhag Thromde; Class B
Samtse	Phuentshogpelri ཕུན་ཚོགས་དབལ་རི་་	Gomtu	Yenlag Thromde
Sarpang	Gelephu དགེ་ལེགས་ཕུ་	Gelephu	Dzongkhag Thromde; Class A
Sarpang	Gakiling, Shompangkha	Sarpang	Dzongkhag Thromde; Class B
Thimphu	Chang ལྕང་	Thimphu	Dzongkhag Thromde; Class A
Thimphu	Kawang ཀ་ཝང་	Thimphu	Dzongkhag Thromde; Class A
Thimphu	Mewang སྨད་ཝང	Khasadrapchu	Yenlag Thromde
Trashigang	Samkhar བསམ་མཁར་	Trashigang	Dzongkhag Thromde; Class B
Trashigang	Shongpu ་ཤོང་ཕུག	Rangjung	Yenlag Thromde
Trashi Yangtse	Bumdeling བུམ་སྡེ་གླིང་	Trashiyangtse	Dzongkhag Thromde; Class B
Trashi Yangtse	Khamdang བུམ་སྡེ་གླིང་	Duksum	Yenlag Thromde
Trongsa	Nubi ནུ་སྦིས་	Trongsa	Dzongkhag Thromde; Class B
Trongsa	Dragteng ་བྲག་སྟེང	Kuengarabten	Yenlag Thromde
Tsirang	Kikhorthang དཀྱིལ་འཁོར་ཐང་	Damphu	Dzongkhag Thromde; Class B
Tsirang	Mendrelgang མནྜལ་སྒང	Mendrelgang	Yenlag Thromde
Wangdue Phodrang	Thedtsho ཐེད་ཚོ་	Wangdue Phodrang	Dzongkhag Thromde; Class B
Wangdue Phodrang	Dangchhu ཐེད་ཚོ་	Nobding	Yenlag Thromde
Zhemgang	Trong ཀྲོང་	Zhemgang	Dzongkhag Thromde; Class B
Zhemgang	Ngangla ངང་ལ་	Panbang	Yenlag Thromde

== See also ==
- Dzongkhag
  - Dungkhag
- Gewog
  - Chiwog
- Bhutanese legislation
  - Local Government Act of Bhutan 2009
