= Elections in Bhutan =

Elections in Bhutan are conducted at national (Parliamentary) and local levels. Suffrage is universal for citizens 18 and over, and under applicable election laws. In national elections, also known as the general elections, political party participation is mainly restricted to the lower house of Parliament, and by extension, to the executive nominated by its majority

Bhutan has a national bicameral parliamentary legislature. The National Assembly of Bhutan is the lower house of Parliament and has 47 members. The maximum number of seats at any time is 55, with each member representing a single-seat constituency. Between 2008 and 2013, 45 seats were won by the ruling Bhutan Peace and Prosperity Party (DPT) and 2 were taken by the opposition People's Democratic Party (PDP).

The National Council of Bhutan, the upper house of Parliament, has 20 nonpartisan members popularly elected by each dzongkhag and 5 members appointed by the King of Bhutan. The National Council member was first elected on 31 December 2007.

Bhutan also conducts elections for offices in local governments. Dzongkhags (districts), Gewogs (village blocks), and Thromdes (municipalities), all elect members of local administrative governments with varying degrees of authority.

Prior to 2007, Bhutan had a unicameral national parliament known as the Tshogdu. Parliament became bicameral under the Constitution of Kingdom of Bhutan 2008 and with the kingdom's first National Assembly election the same year.

== Election laws ==
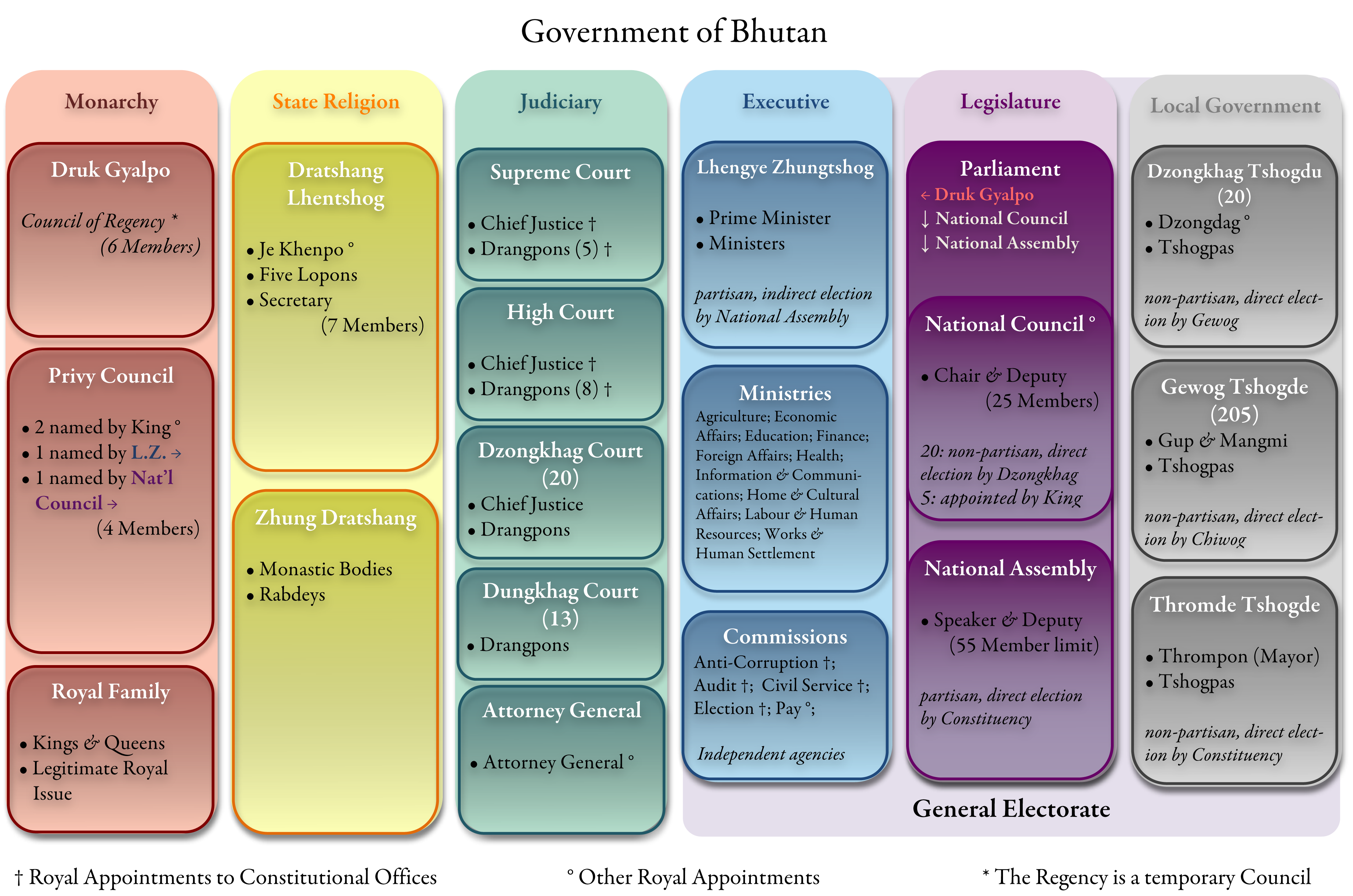
Elected bodies of the Government of Bhutan under the Constitution of 2008

Bhutanese election laws are legislated by the Parliament of Bhutan. These laws cover candidacy, voter registration, campaigning, political parties, and procedural aspects of voting. As of 2011, election law has been codified by the Constitution of 2008, Election Act of 2008, Public Election Fund Act of 2008, National Referendum Act of 2008, National Council Act of 2008, and National Assembly Act of 2008. The Constitution provides a bare substantive and procedural framework, incorporating then-existing election laws insofar as they did not conflict. Notably, religious figures and institutions must remain above (out of) politics. The Election Act of 2008, the most comprehensive of Bhutan's election laws, was passed by Parliament on July 28, 2008, and came into force on August 12, 2008, repealing all previous laws on elections to Parliament and Local Governments. (Note: Election Act 2008: Preamble; §§ 1, 2) The Election Act of 2008 is the latest Bhutanese legislation codifying substantive and procedural laws on constituencies, political parties and their candidates, campaigns, elections, electoral oversight, and suffrage. It also defines a number of offenses related to elections and voting, supplementing the Penal Code. (Note: Election Act 2008: §§ 518–564) The National Referendum, Public Election Finance, National Assembly, and National Council, and Local Government Acts all regulate their particular subject matter within the framework provided by the Constitution and refined by the Election Act.

=== Government commissions ===
The Election Act of 2008 establishes two financially and politically autonomous government commissions to oversee various aspects of elections, voting, and constituency delimitation. The Election Commission of Bhutan is responsible for overseeing the electoral framework established under the Act, including laws on parties, candidates, elections and Election Rolls. (Note: Election Act 2008: §§ 34, 35) The Election Commission is endowed with quasi-judicial powers and staffs of Election Officers and Counting Officers. (Note: Election Act 2008: §§ 36–42) (Note: Constitution: Art. 24)

The Delimitation Commission is an ancillary commission whose sole function is to demarcate single-member constituencies for representatives in Parliament and Local Governments. (Note: Election Act 2008: §§ 76–89)

==== Election Commission ====
The king appoints the Chief Election Commissioner and two other Election Commissioners for five year terms from a list submitted by the Prime Minister, Chief Justice, Speaker of the National Assembly, Chairperson of the National Council, and leader of the opposition party. (Note: Election Act 2008: §§ 20–31) (Note: Constitution: Art. 2, § 19) The Election Commission oversees political parties, runs elections, reviews the electoral system, makes rules and regulations under the Act, and possesses the summoning, inspection, and adjudicative powers of a court of law. (Note: Election Act 2008: §§ 32–37, 45) The Election Commission also has the power to deploy security personnel and to requisition premises, vehicles, and horses from private parties on payment of reasonable compensation "as the Commission may deem appropriate." (Note: Election Act 2008: §§ 38–40) The Election Commission is supported by a Secretariat to which the Commission may delegate any of its authority by resolution or order. (Note: Election Act 2008: §§ 46, 47) Decisions and actions of the Election Commission are not reviewable by courts of the judicial system of Bhutan except in cases of election petitions or election appeals. (Note: Election Act 2008: § 44)

During elections, the Election Commission designates a senior government officer as Chief Election Coordinator in each Dzongkhag, whose primary function is to facilitate free and fair elections. (Note: Election Act 2008: §§ 49–51) The Election Commission also designates a government officer in each Dzongkhag as Dzongkhag Electoral Officer, whose primary duty is to revise and update Electoral Rolls for all parliamentary and local government constituencies on behalf of the Commission. (Note: Election Act 2008: §§ 52–55) These twenty Officers are each supported by staff including one or more Electoral Registration Officers appointed by the Commission. (Note: Election Act 2008: §§ 56–58) Returning Officers and their assistants are likewise designated by the Commission for one or more constituencies, reporting directly to the Commission. (Note: Election Act 2008: §§ 59–63) Returning Officers appoint a Presiding Officer for each polling station; Presiding Officers are in turn assisted by Polling Officers. (Note: Election Act 2008: §§ 64–68) Returning Officers also appoint Counting Personnel for the tallying and inspection of votes. (Note: Election Act 2008: §§ 69, 409–412) The Election Commission may appoint independent observers, and with the approval of the Ministry of Foreign Affairs, may also include international observers, any of whom may bring apparent irregularities or violations of the law to the attention of the Election Commission. (Note: Election Act 2008: §§ 73–75)

All Election Officers are bound by a code of conduct forbidding corruption, conflicts of interest, and acts or speech of a political nature. The same code of conduct mandates Officers to assist the "physically challenged," a category that includes the visually impaired, physically disabled, illiterate individuals, and inhabitants of remote areas. (Note: Election Act 2008: §§ 309–325)

==== Delimitation Commission ====
The ancillary Delimitation Commission consists of six persons: the Chief Election Commissioner and two Election Commissioners; the Secretary of the Ministry responsible for Urban and Municipal Administration; the Secretary of the Ministry responsible for Civil Registration and Census; and the Surveyor-General. (Note: Election Act 2008: § 81) The Delimitation Commission periodically re-allocates a maximum of 55 National Assembly seats among Dzongkhags, and controls the number of representatives at leach level of local government, subject to review and approval of the Election Commission. (Note: Election Act 2008: §§ 76–81, 90–99)

The Delimitation Commission divides dzongkhags, gewogs, and dzongkhag thromdes into relevant constituencies based on voter population, contiguity of areas, and geographical conditions.(Delimitation) (Note: Election Act 2008: § 86) The Commission regularly publishes updates in several media to disseminate its information. (Note: Election Act 2008: §§ 87–89)

=== Constituencies ===
In the 2011 local government elections, there were 205 gewog-level constituencies among the twenty Dzongkhags; gewog governments were elected by chiwog, the most basic electoral constituency.

The Bhutanese electorate is composed solely of single member constituencies at both national and local levels. (Note: Election Act 2008: §§ 3–19)

The National Assembly should have a maximum of 55 partisan members that are directly elected by Dzongkhag voters. (Note: Election Act 2008: § 4) Each Dzongkhag must have between two and seven constituencies for the National Assembly elections. (Note: Election Act 2008: §§ 5–7) The Constitution provides that members sit for five years, or until dissolution upon a vote of no confidence. (Note: Constitution: Art. 10, § 24; Art. 15, § 12)

The National Council has 25 members comprising one directly elected nonpartisan representative from each of the twenty dzongkhags and five "eminent persons" nominated by the king. (Note: Election Act 2008: §§ 8–10) Every gewog and independent thromde ("dzongkhag thromde") comprises a constituency that nominates one candidate for the National Council through a democratic election called a zomdu overseen by heads of local government and run by the Dzongkhag Electoral Officer. (Note: Election Act 2008: § 11) The members of the National Council are elected for five year terms. (Note: Constitution: Art. 10, § 24)

The local Dzongkhag Tshogdu comprises one elected Gup (headman) and Mangmi (deputy) from each Gewog Tshogde; one elected representative from that Dzongkhag Thromde; and one elected representative from the Dzongkhag Yenlang Thromdes. (Note: Election Act 2008: §§ 12, 13) (Note: Local Government Act: §§ 7, 8)

More locally, the Gewog Tshogde comprises between five and eight Tshogpas, who are directly elected according to chiwog constituencies, and the Gup (headman) and Mangmi (deputy), who are directly elected by gewog voters at-large. (Note: Election Act 2008: §§ 14–16) (Note: Local Government Act: §§ 9, 10)

Most locally, the citizens of thromde (municipalities) directly elect between seven and ten members, including a Thrompon as executive, to the Thromde Tshogde. (Note: Election Act 2008: §§ 17–19) (Note: Local Government Act: §§ 11–15)

=== Voters ===
Bhutanese citizens eighteen years or older, who have been registered in their constituency for at least one year, who hold a citizenship identity card, and who are "not otherwise disqualified from voting under [the Election Act] or any other law in force" may cast a single vote in elections. (Note: Election Act 2008: §§ 100, 326–328) The Constitution mandates that religious figures remain "above politics," while the only special ground under the Election Act is being declared "of unsound mind" by a court, the clause is permissive of reducing voting rights through other legislation. (Note: Election Act 2008: §§ 101–103, 326–328)

Every eligible voter may join or lead one political party provided they are not disqualified by other law; political parties meanwhile operate under their charters within the limits and requirements of the Election Act. (Note: Election Act 2008: §§ 154–156) Party members' rights are nonetheless assured a measure of due process: suspension or expulsion requires a reasonable opportunity for the member to be heard beforehand.

During elections, employers must give leave to vote for a reasonable time so long as employees give prior notice. (Note: Election Act 2008: §§ 338–342)

==== Electoral Rolls ====
Voters must be a member of exactly one local constituency, and must maintain an entry on that constituency's Electoral Rolls in order to vote. (Note: Election Act 2008: §§ 101, 104–120) However, voters accomplish this by joining the general (parliamentary) Electoral Roll in their dzongkhag, which is kept and updated by the Dzongkhag Electoral Registration Officer; it is the Officer who sorts the voters into constituencies. (Note: Election Act 2008: §§ 101, 104–108) The Officer issues every voter a voter photo identity card for use in polling (Note: Election Act 2008: §§ 109–111)

Electoral Rolls are published and open for public inspection under the Election Act of 2008. (Note: Election Act 2008: §§ 112–118)

=== Political parties ===
The Election Act of 2008 provides for the formation of political parties, provided they register and operate within, and swear to uphold, the Constitution and sovereignty of Bhutan. Registration requires an application process similar to incorporation, disclosing the essentials of the party leadership, membership, charter, and requirements including symbols and particular name and logo. Parties are required to promote democracy, and are forbidden to organize along status lines, including region, gender, language, or religion. (Note: Election Act 2008: §§ 131–136) The Election Commission denies applications of parties based on status, business concerns; of those with military or paramilitary structures; and of others within its discretion. (Note: Election Act 2008: §§ 137–141) Those that are accepted are registered and overseen by the Secretariat of the Election Commission. (Note: Election Act 2008: §§ 143–145)

All political parties must make annual disclosures including their assets, income, expenditures, and membership. (Note: Election Act 2008: §§ 152, 153) Parties may derive income from registration fees, membership fees, and voluntary contributions from members within limits set by the Election Commission. (Note: Election Act 2008: §§ 158–162)

Political parties may be dissolved voluntarily, by the Supreme Court, or by removal from registers by the Election Commission. (Note: Election Act 2008: §§ 146–151)

=== Nominations, candidates, and campaigns ===
Only registered political parties may nominate candidates for election to the National Assembly, and may only field as many candidates as there are seats available. Nominations are generally scrutinized and handled by the Returning Officer and overseen by the Election Commission, and withdrawals are available both voluntarily and by subsequent finding of ineligibility. (Note: Election Act 2008: §§ 205–212. 216–229) If the Returning Officer denies a nomination, appeals may be made to the Election Commission under a set procedure. (Note: Election Act 2008: §§ 237–244)

Political parties nominate candidates for partisan elections according to their charters. (Note: Election Act 2008: § 157) Otherwise, the Election Law of 2008 sets forth qualifications for candidates at all levels: all candidates must be citizens between ages 25 and 65, and must be members of the constituencies they represent. Candidates for Parliament must possess a formal university degree, while candidates for local offices need to produce be certificate of functionally literacy test to attest that they are adequately skilled. Furthermore, only candidates for the National Assembly may belong to a political party. (Note: Election Act 2008: §§ 175–178) Candidates must make public disclosures regarding professions, income, assets and liabilities, educational qualifications, and criminal record; the disclosure is reviewed by the Returning Officer. (Note: Election Act 2008: §§ 213–215) All candidates must also obtain a security clearance. For non-partisan elections, a declaration of partisan non-affiliation must also be filed. As part of their candidature, they also choose a symbol and appear on a list published by the Returning Officer. (Note: Election Act 2008: §§ 230–232)

Candidates are disqualified if they, inter alia, have ever been sentenced to imprisonment or found guilty of corruption in elections, are married to foreigners, is facing a pending felony, or holds any "office of profit." Members of the royal family and religious personalities are not eligible to participate in parties or the electoral process as they remain separate from politics and are treated to remain above politics. (Note: Election Act 2008: §§ 179–184)

"Offices of profit" are defined as various executive, judicial, and legislative offices, including those controlling appointments and the disbursement of state or public moneys. Offices of profit also include private business executives and boards of directors. The Election Act provides several civil service and public office exemptions; determinations on the issue are decided by the Election Commission, then reviewed by the High Court. (Office of Profit) (Note: Election Act 2008: §§ 163–174)

Campaigns must be conducted within proscribed periods, with equitable time reserved among candidates on electronic media. (Note: Election Act 2008: §§ 267–276) Campaign financing is also thoroughly regulated, from contributions to expenses. (Note: Election Act 2008: §§ 277, 278–288) The Election Act contains an Election Code of Conduct that includes mandates and prohibitions for parties and candidates, including a bans on wearing of kabneys (which convey social and official status) in public campaigns, approaching voters at polling places, and holding public meetings within 48 hours of any poll. (Note: Election Act 2008: §§ 289–308)

==== Representatives ====
Political parties may retain Election Representatives in each constituency, and candidates can retain their own representatives during elections, including Polling and Counting Representatives. All such representatives must register with their respective Returning Officer. (Note: Election Act 2008: §§ 254–266) While an Election Representative is a party representative, a candidate representative attends and observes polling and counting on behalf of a single candidate. (Note: Election Act 2008: §§ 245–253)

=== Elections ===
The National Assembly is elected in primary and general rounds every five years, or whenever it is dissolved under the Constitution; the Election Commission must schedule elections at least 90 days in advance of either. (Note: Election Act 2008: §§ 185–189) The Election Commission must likewise schedule elections for the National Council within 90 days of the expiry of its five-year term. (Note: Election Act 2008: §§ 190–193) Local Governments, themselves subject to votes of confidence, must also have elections scheduled within 90 days of dissolution. (Note: Election Act 2008: §§ 194–197) The Election Act further provides for the Election Commission to announce dates for nominations and polling. (Note: Election Act 2008: §§ 198–204)

Polls are commenced as proscribed by the Election Commission and under the supervision of the Presiding Officer, who confirms the emptiness and operation of voting boxes and machines. (Note: Election Act 2008: §§ 352–355) Voting may be paused in the event of emergency, and the Election Act provides a detailed framework for its resumption. (Note: Election Act 2008: §§ 375–381)

Presiding officers direct the admission to polling stations, and must exclude all persons other than candidates and their representatives; voters and their children; those accompanying infirm persons; and Election Officers and civil servants working in connection with polling. (Note: Election Act 2008: § 356) To prevent impersonation, every voter must be marked with an indelible ink. (Note: Election Act 2008: §§ 333, 334)

Dzongkhag Election Officers bear the responsibility of providing adequate and accessible polling stations, and notice to the populace of their location. (Note: Election Act 2008: §§ 335–337)

Secret ballots may be in the form of ballot papers or machines, and must appear in Dzongkha and English. (Note: Election Act 2008: §§ 345–348, 357) In certain cases, ballots may be mailed by overseas officials, civil servants, and military. (Note: Election Act 2008: §§ 419–429) All ballot boxes and machines are sealed and secured at the end of voting by Presiding Officers and transmitted to Dzongkhag Election Officers. (Note: Election Act 2008: §§ 371–374) If ballots are destroyed or tainted by substantial error or irregularity, a fresh poll is required. (Note: Election Act 2008: §§ 382–384)

Exit polls outside polling stations are banned. (Note: Election Act 2008: §§ 343, 344)

Votes are counted under the general supervision of the Returning Officer, supported by Counting Officers selected from among Election Officers so that no Officer counts the votes from his station. (Note: Election Act 2008: §§ 385–392, 399–404) Those who can be present include candidates and their representatives; observers appointed by the Election Commission; counting staff; public servants aiding elections; and other persons authorized by the Election Commission. (Note: Election Act 2008: § 396–398) Votes are subjected to scrutiny, may be viewed but not touched by those other than counting staff, and may be rejected for a variety of reasons detailed below. (Note: Election Act 2008: §§ 405–412)

The result is tallied by the Returning Officer, (Note: Election Act 2008: §§ 430–432) and there is a separate procedure proscribed for recounts when demanded by a party, candidate, or representative within 24 hours of the result upon reasonable grounds. (Note: Election Act 2008: §§ 433–440) The results of any count or recount are published, and successful candidates are notified by their respective bodies. (Note: Election Act 2008: §§ 441–462)

In the event of disputes surrounding elections and candidates, the Election Act provides a substantive and procedural framework for petitions, trials, and withdrawals and abatements of petitions. (Note: Election Act 2008: §§ 466–510) The Election Act also provides a procedural framework for appeals to the Supreme Court for Parliamentary offices, and to the High Court for local government offices. (Note: Election Act 2008: §§ 511–517)

==== Challenging identity, provisional votes, and rejection of votes ====
Election Representatives may challenge the identity of voters and refer them to the Presiding Officer of the polling place. (Note: Election Act 2008: §§ 361–363) It is within the Officer's discretion to debar the voter, (Note: Election Act 2008: § 364) however if he finds a Representative's challenge to constitute harassment of voters or obstruction of smooth polling, the representative may be ejected. (Note: Election Act 2008: §§ 365, 366)

Those voters whose identity likewise fails scrutiny of the Presiding Officer are allowed to swear an oath, file an affidavit, and cast a provisional vote, which is sealed in an envelope. (Note: Election Act 2008: §§ 367–369) The consideration of provisional ballots is left to the discretion of election commission, and no particular procedure is described under the Election Act. (Note: Election Act 2008: § 406)

Votes may otherwise be rejected if they are blank, are unauthenticated by the Presiding Officer, are illegible, indicate more than one selection for a given vote, or have been marked with an instrument not officially provided at the polling station. (Note: Election Act 2008: § 407)

==== National referendums ====
National referendums are governed by the Constitution. (Note: Election Act 2008: §§ 565–574) (Note: Constitution: Art. 34) The Constitution provides that the a simple majority of the total number of votes cast and counted shall be required for a referendum to be adopted, however results are subject to review and confirmation by the Election Commission. (Note: Election Act 2008: §§ 568, 569) Referendums may be initiated by the king if, in his opinion, a bill that fails in a joint sitting of Parliament is of national importance; if Parliament likewise insists on the passage of a bill not assented to by the king; or if an appeal is made by not less than fifty percent of the total number of members of all Dzongkhag Tshogdus. (Note: Constitution: Art. 34, § 2; Art. 35, § 3) (Note: The Election Act of 2008 (§§ 565, 567) may be read to delegate outright discretionary initiation powers to the monarch; such an inconsistent reading is trumped by the Constitution (Art. 1, § 10; Art. 34, § 2).) A National Referendum may not be held regarding taxes or any other grounds as might be prescribed by law made by Parliament, and a Referendum may not be withdrawn once initiated. (Note: Election Act 2008: §§ 566, 570, 571) (Note: Constitution: Art. 34, § 3) Referendums are approved by a simple majority. The Constitution further mandates Parliament to prescribe the procedure for holding a National Referendum, which it has done; as of 2011, the National Referendum Act is available only in Dzongkha, however.

=== Offenses under the Election Act of 2008 ===
The Election Act of 2008 codifies numerous offenses, supplementing the Penal Code, related to elections, punishments for which range from warning to felony convictions (three years or more imprisonment). Among the offenses listed are those related to breach of code of conduct, conducting exit polls, sale of alcohol during polling periods, and broadcasting political messages from outside Bhutan (misdemeanors) to making and accepting illegal contributions, influencing Commissions, canvassing poll places, campaigning or holding public gatherings within 48 hours of a poll (fourth degree felonies). (Note: Election Act 2008: §§ 276, 324, 325, 344, 518–564)

== Election-related issues ==
Bhutan faces some obstacles in its implementation of its envisaged fully participatory democracy. Citizens' participation in voting and running for office, delayed elections, electoral rolls, and voters' confidence in electronic voting machines (EVMs), have been notable issues in Bhutanese elections. Candidacy requirements including security clearance and extensive competence, legal, and documentary showings have served to dwindle numbers of available local government cadres. As a result, local government elections slated for 2008 were delayed until 2011. The political, though not electoral, landscape is largely male-dominated. Furthermore, other aspects of the Bhutanese legal landscape, from the Constitution to citizenship legislation, shape election-related issues in Bhutan.

=== Delayed elections and government action ===
Between 2008 and 2011, delayed and staggered elections for local level government has resulted in an inability to form quora on the Dzongkhag, Gewog, and Thromde levels. Although elections were originally slated for 2008, various participatory hurdles, demarcation problems, and legal questions posed by the Election Commission regarding the constitutionality of election laws produced significant delays. Although demarcation is a basic requisite for the determination of electoral rolls, the task presented particular difficulty for the government. The electoral rolls themselves, and requirements behind registration, served to lower the level of participation.

=== Electoral rolls ===
Because of electoral rolls reflect census data on citizenship and origin, many would-be voters in 2011 were legally registered in Dzongkhags and Chiwogs other than where they reside. This is especially true in urban areas such as Thimphu, where some 6,000 were eligible to vote out of a population of over 86,000.

=== Participation ===
Between 2008 and 2011, recruitment and retention of Tshogpas, or local government council members, remained a serious issue. Obstacles range from lack of interest and lack of economic incentives to difficulty in compliance and obtaining accreditation under existing election laws. The functional literacy and skills test alone left many constituencies without the minimum of two candidates, leading to lengthy delay of the local government elections of 2011, originally slated for 2008. The first round of the functional literacy and skills test left many Gewogs with no representatives, though second round results showed a pass rate over 90%. Although women elected to office remained relatively few (14% before local elections according to the UNHCR), more than half of voters in initial local government elections were women. In initial local-level voting in 2011, voter turnout was about 50%. This has raised the question of whether women would benefit from quotas in public service, highlighting the need to encourage further female electoral and political participation.

In contrast, many lay monks and former lay monks, facing Constitutional hurdles in voting as well as registering and certifying as candidates, have actively sought to participate in elections and government since democratization.

=== Electronic voting machines ===
In its elections, Bhutan uses 4,000 electronic voting machines (EVMs) produced in Hyderabad and Bangalore, India. The EVMs were used in National Assembly elections, National Council elections, and local elections. An incident of tampering similar EVMs in India had put their security into question, however the Chief Election Commissioner assured the public that last-minute randomized EVM distribution and adequate backup machines prevented tampering.

=== Proposed amendments ===
In 2012, amendments were proposed that would change government funding of the ruling and opposition parties, oversight by the executive and parliament, and restrictions on partisan status. These amendments failed to gain the required endorsements of three-quarters of parliament, and were tabled without public deliberation.

== See also ==
- Bhutanese legislation
  - Constitution of Bhutan
  - Local Government Act of Bhutan 2009
- Law enforcement in Bhutan
- Electoral calendar
- Electoral system
