= Law enforcement in Bhutan =

Law enforcement in Bhutan is the collective purview of several divisions of Bhutan's Ministry of Home and Cultural Affairs. Namely, the Ministry's Bureau of Law and Order, Department of Immigration, and Department of Local Governance are responsible for law enforcement in Bhutan. The Ministry of Home and Cultural Affairs is itself a part of the Bhutanese Lhengye Zhungtshog, or Council of Ministers. Generally, law enforcement in Bhutan is the responsibility of executive agencies. As a means of enforcement, police and immigration authorities prosecute cases in the judicial system through the Attorney General of Bhutan.

Criminal law and procedure are established by acts of parliament. The Parliament of Bhutan has passed several acts regarding law enforcement and criminal law and procedure, namely the National Security Act of 1992, the Civil and Criminal Procedure Code of 2001, the Penal Code of 2004, the Constitution of 2008, and the Prison Act of 2009. Numerous other issue-based acts, such as the Tobacco Control Act of Bhutan 2010, also define crimes, penalties, and responsible enforcement agencies.

== Law enforcement agencies ==
Law enforcement in Bhutan is carried out mainly by the Royal Bhutan Police, however immigration and customs laws are also enforced by officers of the Department of Immigration. Under the Local Government Act of 2009, local governments are also tasked with promulgation of rules, regulation, and some law enforcement. These local governments are liaised by the Department of Local Governance. In judicial proceedings, all law enforcement agencies are represented and advised by the Attorney General of Bhutan.

=== Royal Bhutan Police ===
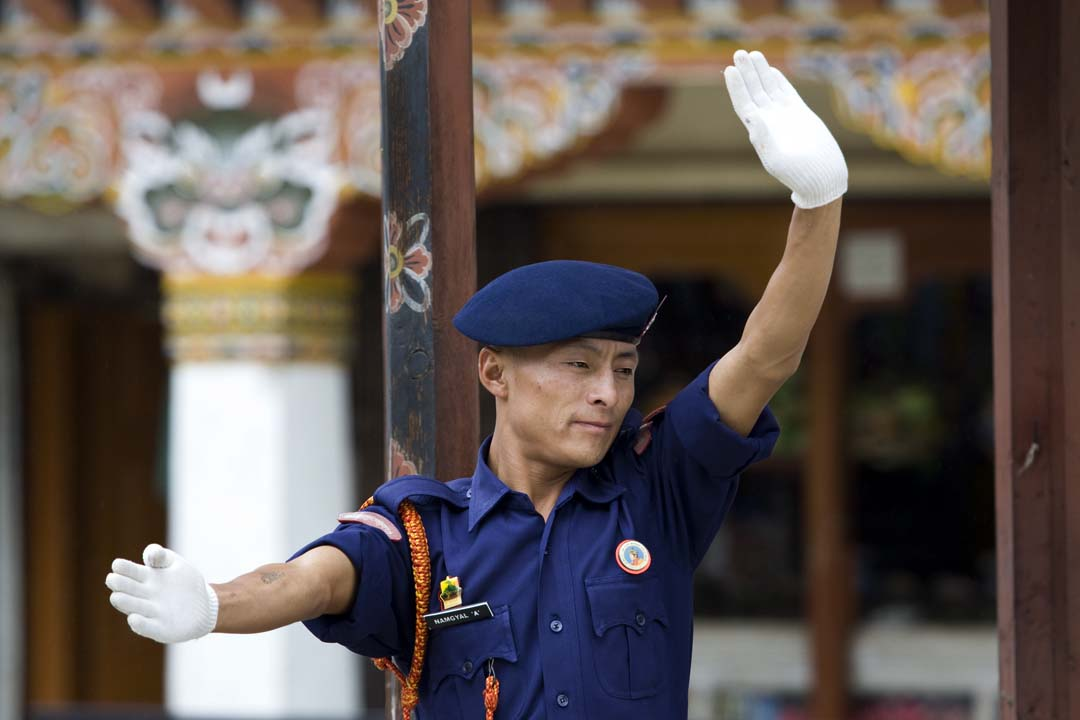
Traffic police in Thimphu.

The Royal Bhutan Police is responsible for maintaining law and order and prevention of crime in Bhutan. It was formed on 1 September 1965 with 555 personnel reassigned from the Royal Bhutan Army. It was then called the "Bhutan Frontier Guards." Its independent statutory basis was first codified with the Royal Bhutan Police Act of 1980. This framework was repealed and replaced in its entirety by the Royal Bhutan Police Act of 2009. Under the Police Act of 2009, the police are divided into exclusive jurisdictions, an array of ranks, and field and special divisions. Police are also charged with administration and maintenance of the prisons of Bhutan according to the Prison Act of 2009.

=== Department of Immigration ===
The Department of Immigration is responsible for immigration, customs, and their enforcement. It implements regulations and policies relating to visas, foreign labor recruitment and inspection, importation of goods, and border security. Its officers are granted broad authority and discretion in policing both public and private spheres, at the border and within Bhutan.

=== Department of Local Governance ===
The Department of Local Governance is indirectly involved in law enforcement in that it provides legal support and advice to the local Dzongkhag, Dungkhag, Gewog, and municipal administrations in cases of arbitration and disputes.

Local governments for their part have regulating and rulemaking powers, including taxation, which are locally enforceable.

== Criminal law in Bhutan ==
There are many sources of criminal law in Bhutanese legislation. The highest legal authority, the Constitution of Bhutan, prohibits capital punishment. Other acts of parliament criminalize specific acts and practices: for example, the Tobacco Act criminalizes the cultivation, manufacture, and sale of tobacco and tobacco products, restricts public tobacco use, criminalizes non-health-related depictions of tobacco in motion media, and modifies the crime of smuggling to include possession of tobacco beyond a person's allotted limit; also, immigration- and customs-related criminal offenses and penalties, as well as quasi-criminal procedure for deportation and detention, are enumerated in the Immigration Act of 2007. The most comprehensive pieces of legislation codifying Bhutanese criminal law and procedure have been the National Security Act of 1992, the Civil and Criminal Procedure Code of 2001, and the Penal Code of 2004.

When deciding whether to prosecute cases under Bhutanese law, the Prosecution and Litigation Division of the Office of the Attorney General first evaluates whether there exists a prima facie case – whether the elements of the offense are met. When a prima facie case is established, the matter is subjected to an "Evidential Test" and a "Public Interest Test." The "Evidential Test" requires sufficient to convict the accused, and that "any reasonable judge would, without compunctions, hold the accused guilty." The "Public Interest Test" requires further that such a prosecution would not have an adverse implication on the public.

=== National Security Act of 1992 ===
The National Security Act is a series of sixteen articles enacted by the parliament of Bhutan on November 2, 1992, that superseded the provisions of the Thrimshung of 1957 pertaining to treason. Although its provisions regarding capital punishment were repealed in 2008, its other provisions regarding speech and unlawful assembly remain intact.

==== Treason and speech crimes ====
The Act condemns to death or life imprisonment those that engage in or attempt treasonable acts against the royal government, either within or outside Bhutan. It also metes out the same penalties for those who commit any overt act intending to aid and comfort enemies to deliberately and voluntarily betray the royal government. Under the act, whoever conspires within or outside Bhutan to commit any of these offenses is to be punished with imprisonment for up to ten years.

The Act also punishes those who undermine or attempt to undermine Bhutan's security by creating or inciting "hatred and disaffection," including by speech, with imprisonment for up to ten years. Speech and other acts that create "misunderstanding or hostility between the government and people of Bhutan and the Government and people of any foreign country" are punishable by up to five years' imprisonment. Furthermore, the Act allows up to three years' imprisonment for those who speak or act to promote or attempt to promote "feelings of enmity or hatred between different religious, racial or language groups or castes and communities, or commits any act which is prejudicial to the maintenance of harmony between different religious, racial or language groups or castes or communities, and which disturbs or is likely to disturb the public tranquility." As such, the Act criminalizes hate speech and propaganda harmful to foreign relations.

==== Unlawful assembly, rioting, and emergency ====
The Act authorizes the government to control public assembly to avoid breaches of the peace, namely by requiring prior licensure, prohibiting public assembly in certain government-controlled areas, and declaring curfews. It further authorizes any magistrate or police officer-in-charge to command any unlawful assembly of five or more persons to disburse if they are likely to cause a disturbance of the peace. Unlawful assemblies are categorically defined as those that seek to overawe the government or its officers by force or show of force; and those that resist the execution of any law or legal process; and those that compel by force or show of force others to do what they are not legally bound to do. Violations are punishable by imprisonment for up to one year.

The Act defines rioting as the use of force by any member of an unlawful assembly in furtherance of the assembly's common object. The offense is punishable by imprisonment up to two years. Likewise, those armed with any deadly weapon as a member of an unlawful assembly are to be punished with imprisonment which may extend to two years. Those guilty of rioting while armed with a deadly weapon are to be punished with imprisonment for up to three years.

Finally, the Act authorizes the Royal Government of Bhutan to declare a state of emergency covering any or all of Bhutan where "natural, social, political or economic factors compel the government to maintain public order."

=== Penal Code of 2004 ===
The modern Bhutanese Penal Code was enacted by parliament on August 11, 2004. The Penal code classifies crimes according to severity, defines the elements and defenses to crimes, and provides a framework for sentencing criminals. The Code sets forth a criminal law framework analogous to that any modern common law jurisdiction.

The classes of crimes defined by the Code are felony, misdemeanor, petty misdemeanor, and violation. Misdemeanors result in imprisonment for one year or more but less than three years; petty misdemeanors result in imprisonment for one month or more but less than one year; and violations result in a fine. Felonies are graded into four degrees. First degree felonies are punishable by prison terms of fifteen years to life; second degree felonies – nine to fifteen years; third degree felonies – five to nine years; and fourth degree felonies – three to five years.

Elements and defenses to crimes are codified thematically, along with their class and grading. For example, premeditated murder is listed among "homicide," graded as a first degree felony; and "unnatural sex," including sodomy, is listed among "sexual offences," graded as a petty misdemeanor.

Under the Act, the class and grading of the crime committed, along with a "value-based sentencing" schedule, generally inform the sentencing of criminals. Subsequent convictions for the same crime face sentencing enhancement by one degree. Fines are limited under the sentencing provisions, and the value of any damages is to factor into sentencing. When sentencing, courts are also allowed to consider mitigating and aggravating factors.

=== Historical legal codes ===
Bhutanese criminal law was first codified in the 16th century Tsa Yig. Based on Buddhist religious law, the Tsa Yig prohibited immoral crimes such as murder in regard to all persons, and prohibited other immoral acts such unchastity in regard to the Sangha. As a modern nation, Bhutan revised the Tsa Yig in 1957 and ostensibly replaced it with a new code in 1965. The 1965 code, however, retained most of the spirit and substance of the 17th century code. In modern Bhutan, village heads often judged minor cases and dzongkhag (district) officials adjudicated major crimes.

== See also ==
- Royal Bhutan Police
- Crime in Bhutan
- Judicial system of Bhutan
- Law of Bhutan
- Immigration in Bhutan
- Capital punishment in Bhutan
- Censorship in Bhutan
- LGBT rights in Bhutan
