= Law of Bhutan =

The law of Bhutan derives mainly from legislation and treaties. Prior to the enactment of the Constitution, laws were enacted by fiat of the King of Bhutan. The law of Bhutan originates in the semi-theocratic Tsa Yig legal code, and was heavily influenced through the twentieth century by English common law. As Bhutan democratizes, its government has examined many countries' legal systems and modeled its reforms after their laws.

The supreme law of Bhutan is the Constitution of 2008. Under the Constitution, laws are passed through a bicameral process requiring the assent of the National Assembly and National Council of Parliament, as well as the assent of the King. The final authority on law of Bhutan and its interpretation is the Supreme Court. Laws enacted in Bhutan prior to the Constitution of 2008 remain intact insofar as they do not conflict with the Constitution.

Much of Bhutanese law is premised on promoting Gross National Happiness, a fundamental principle of the Constitution.

The law of Bhutan is enforced by the national police, established in 1965. The judicial system of Bhutan, namely the Royal Court of Justice, brings and hears cases and interprets the law of Bhutan. Agencies of Ministries within the Lhengye Zhungtshog (Cabinet) as well as independent Commissions are established by law to implement relevant laws, provide regulations, and establish procedural frameworks.

== Sources of law ==
Bhutanese legislation is the source of Bhutanese domestic law, including civil, criminal, and administrative law. Bhutanese legislation is created by the bicameral Parliament of Bhutan. Either the upper house National Council, the lower house National Assembly, or the Attorney General may author bills to be passed as acts, with the exception of money and financial bills, which are the sole purview of the National Assembly. Acts passed predating the enactment of the Constitution in 2008 were passed under different procedures, some originating as promulgations by the King as indicated in their preamble.

Under Article 20 of the Constitution of Bhutan, foreign relations of Bhutan under the purview of the Druk Gyalpo on the advice of the Executive, namely the Prime Minister and other Ministers of the Lhengye Zhungtshog including the Minister of Foreign Affairs. Treaties of Bhutan predating the Constitution of 2008 remain in force, however any treaties adopted after its enactment must be ratified by Parliament.

== Civil law ==
=== Contracts ===
Prima facie requirements of Bhutanese contracts, termed "written agreements," are governed by provisions of Evidence Act of 2005. Valid written agreements must be made in the presence of one witness of each party; be signed by all parties or another person duly empowered by a legally binding writing in that behalf; and be executed with a legal stamp. A contract is invalid if it has an erased word; has an alteration that is not counter-signed; has a defective seal or signature; lacks the proper legal stamp; is made while a party is a minor, mentally unsound, or under duress; is objected to by any party in court within 10 days; is executed in breach of law or to conceal an illegal act; or otherwise fails to conform to any other requirement by law.

=== Property laws ===
Broadly, Bhutanese law divides property into three types: movable (chattels), immovable (real property), and intellectual. Additionally, Bhutan has codified legislation on specific subtypes of property, such as livestock, and on general property-related transactions, such as security interests.

Bhutanese hypothecs, loans, and pledges of movable and immovable property, including mortgages and secured transactions, are governed according to the Moveable and Immovable Property Act of 1999 and Land Act of 2007. These types of security interest are generally the purview of the Royal Court of Justice. Bhutanese law includes normative definitions and procedures for attachment and perfection of security interests as well as types of security interests, such as purchase money security interests. The law also covers default, foreclosure, deficiency, redemption, and allocation of risk of loss in modern terms. Notably, non-citizens are prohibited from taking a security interest in immovable property without prior government approval. Also notably, Bhutanese law provides for tolling of interest for mortgagees while incarcerated, and extends some redemption rights to family members of the debtor.

The Land Act of 2007 establishes the National Land Commission as the government agency overseeing land ownership and transactions. The commission is composed of the Secretaries of the Ministries of Agriculture, Works and Human Settlements, Finance, Trade and Industry, and Home and Cultural Affairs, along with some six other representatives from various public and private interest groups. The Commission oversees land transfers, mortgages, easements, and the national land register ("chhazhag sathram" or "thram"). The commission also issues deeds of land title ("lag thram") and has surveys conducted for registered lands.

Subject to certain limitations, Bhutanese citizens are free to conduct environmentally sound agricultural and commercial activities on the land they own, as well as enter into transactions such as sales and leases. Additionally, the Royal Government is authorized to lease out its reserves for grazing and pasture management ("tsamdro" lands). Land use must generally be licensed by appropriate authorities; for example, commercial agriculture must be licensed by the Ministry of Agriculture. The law imposes a ceiling on land ownership, and provides exemptions for the royal family, government institutions, religious agencies and institutions, and Bhutanese corporations. Because of this ceiling, the law also provides a grace period to dispose of inherited land, or alternatively, intestate succession to the second in line. Under Bhutanese law, all mineral rights are vested in the state, and the Mines and Minerals Management Act and other laws regulate their use and management. Contiguous lots of land under common ownership may be merged only with local government approval. Further limits on land ownership include escheat in the event of intestacy ("tsatong" lands), non-use of land for 3 years, and non-payment of land taxes.

The reigning Druk Gyalpo is empowered to grant kidu, or parcels of land, and may also grant plots for land rehabilitation purposes.

Tenancies and other estates in land less than outright ownership are governed by the Tenancy Act of 2004, and by Land Act of 1979 where incorporated by Tenancy Act. Under these laws, tenancies must be supported by a written lease with definite terms. Tenancies entail several rights and obligations for tenant and landlord, enumerated by statute. These include many rights similar to common law guarantees, such as the tenant's right of "peaceful enjoyment" and duty to refrain from nuisance and dangerous activities. These also include remedies such as lease cancellation and rent abatement for a landlord's breach of warranty of habitability, and eviction for tenant's breach of duty to pay rent over two months. In Bhutan, however, sub-leases are unlawful. Notably, tenancies pass according to a set order upon the death of the leaseholder. Bhutanese law also contains provisions on rents the limit annual increases to 10 percent of the monthly rent. Tenancies are regulated by the Tenancy Authority, an agency of the Ministry of Works and Human Settlement.

==== Intellectual property ====
Intellectual property law is seen mainly in the Copyright Act and Industrial Property Act of 2001. Under the Copyright Act, Bhutanese copyright protection lasts for the life of the author, plus fifty years after death; in the case of joint authors, it lasts for fifty years after the death of the last author. Collective and anonymous works are protected for fifty years after publication. Applied art is protected for twenty-five years from creation. Bhutanese intellectual property law recognizes both economic and moral rights of the author; the former is freely assignable in whole or in part.

Bhutan protects other types of intellectual property, such as patents, trademarks, trade dress, and industrial design, through the Industrial Property Act.

The Intellectual Property Division of the Ministry of Economic Affairs is responsible for maintaining registration and upholding intellectual property law. The Division cites low levels of awareness and innovation along with poor coordination among stakeholders as hampering the development of intellectual property in Bhutan. It launched its registration system for industrial design in 2009, and had registered two designs as of April 2011.

== Corporate law ==
Bhutan has regulated corporations since 1989, most recently under the Companies Act of 2000. Corporations and other legal entities are overseen by the Ministry of Trade and Industry and its various subsidiary agencies. Within the government of Bhutan, the Minister of Trade and Industry represents his ministry in the Lhengye Zhungtshog (Executive Cabinet).

Bhutanese law regulates incorporation, capital, debentures, shares and issuance of stock and securities, corporate management and accounting, directorships, mergers and acquisitions, and dissolution. Notably, licensure to commence business as a Bhutan corporation requires the discretionary approval of the Minister of Trade and Industry; imposes joint and several liability upon directors for ultra vires conduct; and prohibits unsecured debentures. The bulk of Bhutanese corporate law, however, is identical to those of modern nations, including statutory shareholder inspection rights, the dichotomy between "equity shares" (common) and preference shares, and solvency doubly defined as the ability to pay debts as they become due and as the excess of assets against debts. (Cf. general corporate and insolvency laws)

Since 2007, Bhutan has separately regulated civil society organizations ("CSOs"). These include associations, societies, foundations, charitable trusts, nonprofit organizations or other entities outside government that do not distribute any income or profits to their members, founders, donors, directors or trustees. Excluded from CSO status are trade unions, political parties, cooperatives, and religious organizations devoted primarily to religious worship. Rather, the latter group is separately regulated under the Religious Organizations Act of 2007, which aims to protect and preserve the spiritual heritage of Bhutan through providing for the registration and administration of religious organizations. To meet those goals, the Act creates the Chhoedey Lhentshog as the regulatory authority on religious organizations. This body regulates, monitors, and keeps records on all religious organizations in Bhutan, which are in turn required to register and maintain specified corporate formalities.

== Public law ==
=== Citizenship and immigration law ===
Bhutanese citizenship and immigration laws are found in the Citizenship Act of 1985 and Immigration Act of 2007, respectively. The Bhutanese citizenship law is generally an ambilineal jus sanguinis law, meaning it is transmitted by parentage as opposed to place of birth, and requires that both parents be Bhutanese. The law also requires continuous registration in local registers. Naturalization requires cultural familiarity and assimilation and allegiance to the Druk Gyalpo. Immigration laws establish a visa schedule and divide aliens into immigrant and non-immigrant categories. They also empower immigration inspectors with broad authority to prosecute offenders, and to detain and search persons and places, both public and private.

=== Election and government law ===
Bhutanese law also treats elections and governments, from elections of local governments to national elections and referendums. The sole subject matter that is forbidden to national referendums is taxation. Bhutan is composed of single-member constituencies that elect representatives at the local levels – thromde (municipality), gewog (village block), and dzongkhag (district) – as well as the national level – Parliament. Election laws establish the eligibility of candidates, parties, and voters, as well as the procedures for voting, counting, and disputing ballots. While the national Parliament alone has lawmaking authority, many powers including taxation, rulemaking, and law enforcement, have been devolved to elected local governments since the 1990s.

=== Employment and labor law ===
Within the Bhutanese government, the Ministry of Labour and Human Resources, Labour Administration, implements labor laws, formulates labor regulations, inspects workplaces, and advises employers and employees of their rights and obligations. The Labour Administration is headed by the Chief Labour Administrator.

Employment and labor law are codified in the Labour and Employment Act of 2007 and provisions of the Wage Act of 1994 that remain unrepealed. Provisions from 1994 that remain unrepealed include facilities and benefits laws including an eight-hour work day, one paid day off for every six worked, insurance and transportation costs borne by the employer, and the basic workman's compensation scheme. Also intact remains a foreign worker ceiling of 30,000 "skilled persons and technicians not available within Bhutan."

Bhutanese labor law prohibits compulsory labor, except for by prisoners or by people as required for "important local and public celebrations." The practice of zhabto lemi (Dzongkha: ཞབས་ཏོག་ལས་མི་; Wylie: zhabs-tog las-mi; "free service; voluntary worker"), a kind of compulsory labor in rural areas for public purposes, was abolished in 2009.

The law also prohibits discrimination and sexual harassment.

==== Worker rights ====
Bhutanese labor law includes mandatory workman's compensation, pensions, wages and hours including overtime; universal rules on leave, including maternity and nursing leave; and comprehensive provisions on employment contracts and related rights and remedies. The law explicitly places the financial burden of ensuring occupational health and safety on the employer, and requires accident and safety reporting.

Bhutanese labor law also permits the formation of workers' associations by any group of 12 or more workers under a legal work contract. These labor associations are permitted to engage in collective bargaining, and to be represented by a non-management employee of their ranks. In the event of an unresolvable dispute, the Chief Labour Administrator is empowered to intervene as conciliator. Settlement may otherwise be reached by resorting to the Royal Court of Justice.

==== Child labor ====
Although child labor is not banned outright, certain practices such as child trafficking, child prostitution, hard labor, night work, and dangerous and unhealthy working conditions are specifically banned. The minimum age for unrestricted work is 18 years. In practice, child labor is common on farms, in shops, and at schools themselves. As of 2009, the UNHCR and UNICEF had found children working at road construction sites, automobile workshops, restaurants and as street vendors; some children were also used in sexual exploitation.

To redress to these conditions, the National Commission for Women and Children works to provide these children with stable households, educational opportunities, and shelter on a monthly basis. The same government agency also oversees foster homes and adoptions of orphans and exploited children.

==== Foreign workers ====
Bhutanese law prohibits the employment of foreigners without permits from the Chief Labour Administrator. The Ministry of Labour and Human Resources is empowered to set maximum numbers of foreigners who may work in Bhutan, and may limit the number of foreigners working in any particular field or industry. The Ministry of Home and Cultural Affairs, Department of Immigration, also oversees and coordinates all foreign workers in Bhutan.

=== Family law ===
Family law is largely a matter of custom, however customary family practices are largely supplemented and superseded by the Marriage Act of 1980, placing marriage largely within the jurisdiction of courts.

The Marriage Act foremost states that persons have "the right to marry any other person, irrespective of status, caste, wealth or appearance", with the exceptions of minority (under 18 for males, under 16 for females) and prohibited consanguinity. Whether the marriage is contracted according to the customary rites and rituals, following an engagement, or a "love marriage", the law requires couples to obtain a marriage certificate ("nyentham") from a local court or gup (village headman) in order to be legally married. Requirements for certification include the endorsement of a surety, and that the couple consist of one male bridegroom and one female bride per marriage. Other restrictions on marriage include a limit of three marriages for parties whose marriages repeatedly end in divorce due to their own misconduct. Remarriage requires the consent of the former spouse, and when widowed, a waiting period of one year. Notably, women in Bhutan may by custom be married to several husbands, however they are allowed only one legal husband. The legal status of married couples among polygamous and polyandrous households impacts the division of property upon divorce and survivorship, as well as general admissibility of the marital relationship in courts.

In addition to marriage, the Marriage Act thoroughly treats adultery, sexual assaults, separation, divorce, child support, child custody, and a host of compensable offenses. Adultery by a married man is not compensable as adultery in Bhutanese law, however adultery and attempted adultery with a married woman must be compensated by payment ("gawo") from the third party to the husband; when a married woman commits adultery with a religious celibate, both additionally face a six-month term of "rigorous imprisonment". No compensation is permitted, however, if a husband learns of the adultery only after divorce has been granted or if a husband is imprisoned for more than three years (i.e., for a felony). Women receive compensation only when their husbands leave them to legally marry another woman.

Separation requires a payment generally by the party seeking divorce, the amount depending on the length of the marriage, except in the case of spouses separating to take vows of religious celibacy, and in the case of at-home spouses seeking divorce from absent spouses. Separation costs are otherwise imposed on violent spouses, on third parties who induce the divorce, and on wives who admit guilt in adultery. The divorce itself is presented as a deed of divorce ("yikthi"). Divorces are also granted for spouses of those who commit adultery by fraud and rape. Mothers of both legitimate and illegitimate children are entitled to compensation from unwed, separated, or divorced fathers. In the event of maternal mortality, the law imposes a duty on the biological father to pay fines to her family and to raise his child if her family is unable.

Rape is illegal in Bhutan. Under 2004 laws, marital rape is also illegal, being classified as a petty misdemeanor.

The Constitution of Bhutan prohibits persons married to non-citizens from holding office by election or by royal appointment (Constitutional Offices). The Marriage Act mandates a special court petition for Bhutanese desiring to marry non-citizens. The same law imposes a total restriction on promotion for government workers who marry non-citizens, as well as the discharge of any government worker in defense or foreign relations. It also deprives the Bhutanese citizen of many government-related benefits, from land allotment ("kidu"), seeds, and loans, to public and foreign-sponsored education. Bhutanese marriage law prohibits international couples from propagating any religion other than the state religion, Drukpa Kagyu Buddhism, and requires the non-citizen spouse to adopt Bhutanese traditions and customs.

=== Tax law ===
Bhutanese law generally provides for individual and corporate taxation based on income, sales, imports, and movable and immovable property. The tax scheme is established by Parliament, overseen by the Ministry of Finance, and implemented by its Department of Revenue and Customs.

As of 2011, Bhutan's Corporate Income Tax rate was 30 percent on net profits; in addition, the Business Income Tax was another 30 percent on net profits. As for individual taxation, the Department of Revenue and Customs imposes no taxes on the first Nu.100,000 of income; taxes up to Nu.250,000 at 10%; up to Nu.500,000 at 15%; up to Nu.1,000,000 at 20%; and Nu.1,000,001 and above at 25%. In addition, property transfers are taxed at 5%. Rural taxes are also imposed on land, houses, and cattle. Other direct duties includes the motor vehicle tax, foreign travel tax, royalties, business and professional licenses, health contribution taxes, and municipal taxes.

Bhutanese law requires payment of sales tax and excises on goods and services within Bhutan as well as customs on imports according to rates and schedules published by the Ministry of Finance. The law also provides Department of Revenue and Customs agents broad authority to inspect, confiscate, demand accounting, and to detain, fine, and prosecute those who contravene the tax laws. The law further forth a procedural framework for resolving disputes, which may be appealed to the Royal Court of Justice.

As part of Bhutan's program of decentralization, local governments and municipalities – including dzongkhags, gewogs, and thromdes, have been authorized to collect property, services, and transactional taxes since at least 1991. Notably, the Local Government Act of 2009 allows thromdes (municipalities) to levy a separate tax on vacancy and underdevelopment.

Other legislation authorizes or imposes taxes against particular subject matter. For example, the Tobacco Control Act of 2010 requires persons importing tobacco to pay a tax and to furnish proof of payment upon demand. Like many such laws, the Tobacco Control Act defines a set of offenses and penalties for contravening its taxation provisions.

== Criminal law ==
There are many sources of criminal law in Bhutanese legislation. The highest legal authority, the Constitution of Bhutan, prohibits capital punishment. Other acts of Parliament criminalize specific acts and practices: for example, the Tobacco Act criminalizes the cultivation, manufacture, and sale of tobacco and tobacco products, restricts public tobacco use, criminalizes non-health-related depictions of tobacco in motion media, and modifies the crime of smuggling to include possession of tobacco beyond a person's allotted limit; also, immigration- and customs-related criminal offenses and penalties, as well as quasi-criminal procedure for deportation and detention, are enumerated in the Immigration Act of 2007.

The most comprehensive pieces of legislation codifying Bhutanese criminal law and procedure have been the National Security Act of 1992, the Civil and Criminal Procedure Code of 2001, and the Penal Code of 2004. The National Security Act pertains mostly to treason and speech crimes, and to unlawful assembly, rioting, and states of emergency. The Penal code classifies crimes according to severity, defines the elements and defenses to crimes, and provides a framework for sentencing criminals. The Code sets forth a criminal law framework analogous to that any modern common law jurisdiction, for instance division of mens rea into negligence, recklessness, and intent.

The classes of crimes defined by the Code are felony, misdemeanor, petty misdemeanor, and violation. Misdemeanors result in imprisonment for one year or more but less than three years; petty misdemeanors result in imprisonment for one month or more but less than one year; and violations result in a fine. Felonies are graded into four degrees. First degree felonies are punishable by prison terms of fifteen years to life; second degree felonies – nine to fifteen years; third degree felonies – five to nine years; and fourth degree felonies – three to five years.

Elements and defenses to crimes are codified thematically, along with their class and grading. For example, premeditated murder is listed among "homicide", graded as a first degree felony; and unnatural sex, including sodomy, is listed among "sexual offences," graded as a petty misdemeanor.

=== Law enforcement ===
Law enforcement is done mainly by the Royal Bhutan Police, however the Royal Bhutan Army also maintains security in Bhutan. In addition, legislation has enabled several government agencies with varying degrees of law enforcement powers. For example, the Immigration Act of 2007 grants immigration inspectors broad discretion and authority to inspect and arrest, while the Tobacco Control Act provides for enforcement of tobacco and smoking laws by local governments.

== Court system ==
The judiciary of Bhutan is the Royal Court of Justice, consisting of the Supreme Court of Bhutan, the High Court of Bhutan, the twenty Dzongkhag Courts, and some sixteen Dungkhag Courts. Where Dungkhag Courts have geographical jurisdiction (dungkhags, "sub-districts"), they are the courts of first instance; in all other places, the Dungkhag Court is the court of first instance.

The Chief Justice and Drangpons (Associate Justices) of the Supreme Court, as well as judges of the High Court and Dzongkhag Courts below, are appointed by the Druk Gyalpo. The Chief Justice sits for 5 years, but all others sit for 10 or until mandatory retirement.

Within the court system, the government of Bhutan and its organs are advised and represented in civil and criminal proceedings by the Attorney General of Bhutan. The Attorney General is appointed by the King of Bhutan on the advice of the Prime Minister. The Attorney General Act of 2006, wholly incorporated by the Constitution of 2008, tasks the Attorney General with prosecuting crimes, safeguarding the impartiality of the judicial process, and disseminating information about the law among the people. The Attorney General also drafts Bhutanese legislation for submission to parliament, reviews legislation authored in parliament, and advises all levels of government regarding judicial decisions.

In the Bhutanese judicial system, civil and criminal procedure are defined by the Civil and Criminal Procedure Code of 2001. Foremost, the Code provides for open trials, equal protection of the laws, impartiality, and habeas corpus petition rights. Both civil and criminal trials in Bhutan are decided by one or more judges. After final appeal in the court system, the Code provides for appeal to the Druk Gyalpo.

The Code's civil procedure section further provides venue, jurisdiction, and pleadings rules. Many aspects are identical to common law procedure, namely the United States Federal Rules of Civil Procedure, including terminology for claims, pleadings, and motions. In civil actions, the parties are at all times able to resolve their disputes before local government mediators.

=== Legal profession ===
The Constitution guarantees all persons the right to consult and be represented by a Bhutanese jabmi (attorney) of their choice. The legal profession is regulated by the Jabmi Act. The body which regulates the legal profession is defined as the Jabmi Tshogdey, analogous to a bar association. All jabmi must be members of this body in good standing, and the Act sets forth several requirements for membership. All jabmi must be Bhutanese citizens; persons of integrity, good character and reputation; not addicted to drugs; not of unsound mind or of mental infirmity; not adjudged bankrupt; not sentenced for criminal offences; have legal qualification recognized by the Jabmi Tshogdey; have undergone the National Legal Course; and have passed the Bar selection examinations.

== History ==
The history of the law of Bhutan extends to the country's formation in the 17th century. Founder Zhabdrung Ngawang Namgyal's regime was bound by a legal code called the Tsa Yig, which described the spiritual and civil regime and provided laws for government administration and for social and moral conduct. The duties and virtues inherent in the Buddhist dharma (religious law) played a large role in the new legal code, which remained in force until the 1960s. The recent and current enforcement of the Driglam Namzha, the code which governs the dress and behavior in public, may be seen as a part of Zhabdrung Ngawang Namgyal's wider legal legacy in Bhutan.

The Tsa Yig was revised in 1957 and ostensibly replaced with a new code in 1965. The 1965 code, however, retained most of the spirit and substance of the 17th century code. Family problems, such as marriage, divorce, and adoption, usually were resolved through recourse to Buddhist or Hindu religious law. In modern Bhutan, village heads often judged minor cases and dzongkhag (district) officials adjudicated major crimes. The judicial system's civil and criminal codes continued to be built upon the Tsa Yig. Strict censorship laws have been enforced comparable to those of Bhutan's South Asian neighbours.

Trials in the 1980s were public, and it was the practice of the accuser and the accused each to put their cases in person to judges. There were no Jabmi (attorneys) in Bhutan's legal system until the 1980s, and decisions were made on the facts of each case as presented by the litigants. Judges were responsible for investigations, filing of charges, prosecution, and judgment of defendants in an inquisitorial system. Serious crimes were extremely rare throughout the 20th century, although there were reports of increased criminal activity in the 1980s and early 1990s with the influx of foreign laborers, widening economic disparities, and greater contact with foreign cultures.

== See also ==
- Bhutanese legislation
- Constitution of Bhutan
- Royal Court of Justice
- Judicial system of Bhutan
- Politics of Bhutan
- Censorship in Bhutan
- Freedom of religion in Bhutan
