= Hiranyamayee Lama =

Bhutanese politician

Member of the Tshogdu
- In office 1979–
- Constituency: Chengmari

Hiranyamayee Lama was a Bhutanese politician. In 1979 she became the first woman elected to the Tshogdu.

== Biography ==
Lama was K.D. Pradhan's daughter. She was educated in Kalimpong in India and married Dasho Durgadas Lama, who became a royal advisory councillor and was a prominent Christian activist.

In June 1979 Lama was elected to the National Assembly from the Chengmari district as a People's Representative, becoming the first woman to sit in the Parliament of Bhutan.
