= Daga, Bhutan =

Dagana དར་དཀར་ Daga
- Location in Bhutan
- Coordinates: 27°4′N 89°53′E
- Country: Bhutan
- Dzongkhag: Dagana District
- Gewog: Goshi Gewog

Population (2005)
  - Total: 1,146
- Time zone: UTC+6 (BTT)
- Climate: Cwb

Daga , also officially referred to as Dagana, is a town in Goshi Gewog, Dagana District in southwestern Bhutan. It is the administrative capital, Dzongkhag Thromde, of the district.

In 2005, Daga had a population of 1,146.
