= Phuntshothang Gewog =

Phuntshothang Gewog ཕུན་ཚོགས་ཐང་
- Gewog
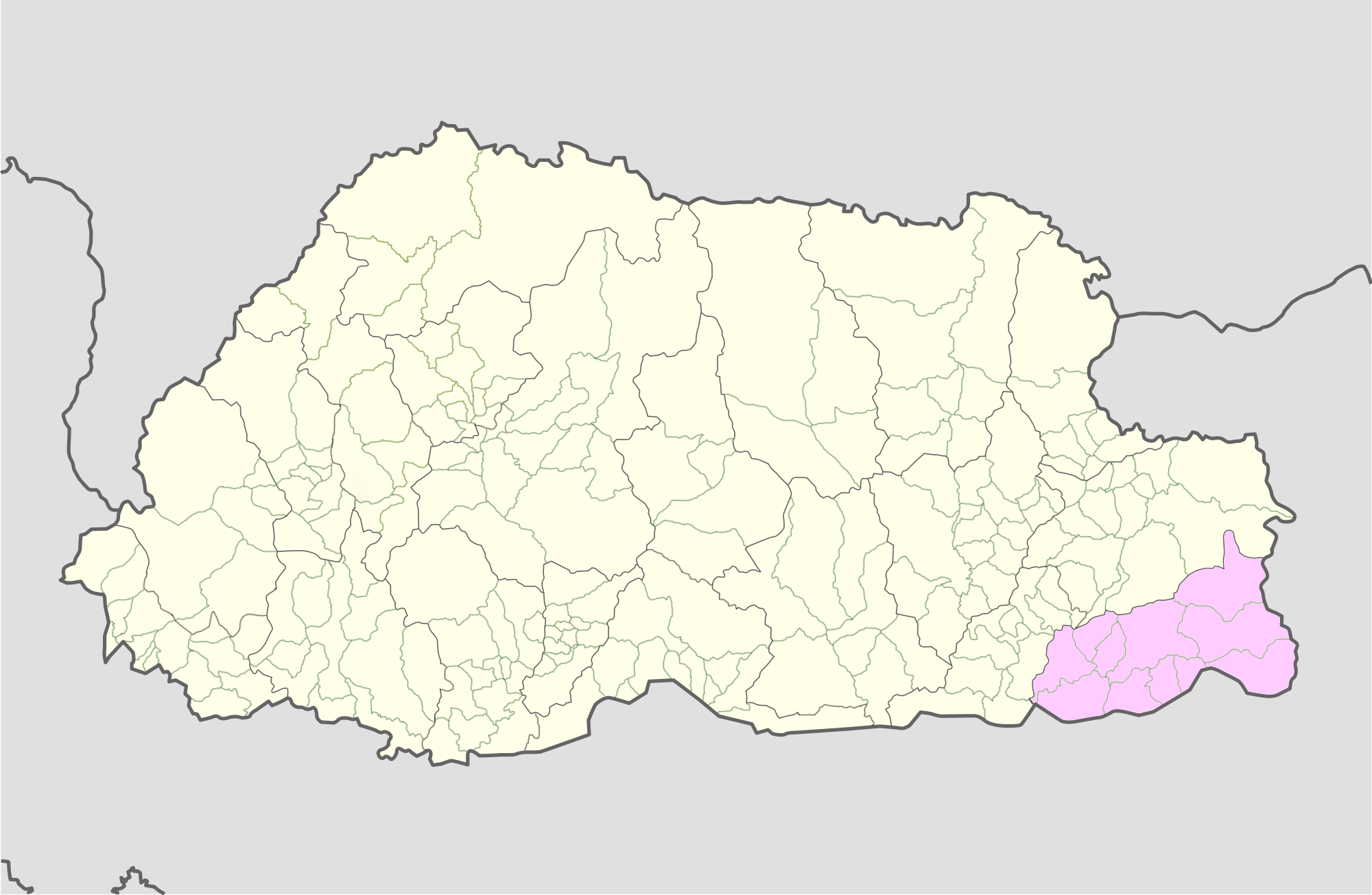
- Interactive map of Phuntshothang Gewog
- Coordinates: 26.8666°N 91.679°E
- Country: Bhutan
- District: Samdrup Jongkhar District
- Time zone: UTC+6 (BTT)

Phuntshothang Gewog (Dzongkha: ཕུན་ཚོགས་ཐང་) is a gewog (village block) of Samdrup Jongkhar District, Bhutan. Phuntshothang and Pemathang Gewogs comprise Samdrup Choling Dungkhag (sub-district).
