= Samdrup Choling =

Coordinates: 26°49′N 91°43′E

Samdrup Choling,colloquially known as Raitar, formerly known as Bhangtar, is a rural town, Yenlag Thromde, in the southeast of Bhutan. It is located in Samdrup Jongkhar District, close to the border with India.
