= Damji =

Damji is an Arabic surname. Notable people with the surname include:

- Farah Damji (born 1966), British criminal
- Kamlesh Pattni (born 1965), Kenyan businessman and pastor
