= Local Government Act of Bhutan 2009 =

The Local Government Act of Bhutan (Dzongkha: འབྲུག་གི་ས་གནས་གཞུངས་སྤྱི་མོ་ཅན་མ་; Wylie: 'brug-gi sa-gans-gzhungs can-ma) was enacted on September 11, 2009, by parliament of Bhutan in order to further implement its program of decentralization and devolution of power and authority. (Note: Local Gov't Act 2008: Preamble) It is the most recent reform of the law on Bhutan's administrative divisions: Dzongkhags, Dungkhags, Gewogs, Chiwogs, and Thromdes (municipalities). The Local Government Act of Bhutan has been slightly amended in 2014.

== Provisions of the Act ==
The Local Government Act of 2009 establishes local governments in each of the twenty Dzongkhags, each overseen ultimately by the Ministry of Home and Cultural Affairs. (Note: Local Gov't Act 2008: §§ 206–208, 263, 294) The Act tasks all local governments with a variety of objectives, including promoting Gross National Happiness; providing democratic and accountable government; preserving culture and tradition; promoting development; protecting public health; and discharging any other duties specifically created by other law. (Note: Local Gov't Act 2008: § 48) Local governments are generally headed by a chairperson and a deputy chairperson who lead, represent, and manage their respective bureaucracies, each answering to the body above it and to parliament of Bhutan. (Note: Local Gov't Act 2008: §§ 66–85) All local governments are administrative divisions and are prohibited to make laws, however they are empowered to make rules and regulations consistent with law as established by parliament. (Note: Local Gov't Act 2008: §§ 3–6) Members of all local governments must be between ages 25 and 65, and sit for five-year terms, or until the local government is dissolved. (Note: Local Gov't Act 2008: §§ 20–21)

=== Dzongkhag governments ===
The Act establishes Dzongkhag Tshogdu (District Council) as the highest decision making body in the Dzongkhag. The Dzongkhag Tshogdu is composed of the Gup and Mangmi (elected leaders) from each Gewog, one representative from that Dzongkhag Thromde, and one representative from the Dzongkhag Yenlag Thromdes. (Note: Local Gov't Act 2008: §§ 7–8) Dzongkhag Tshogdus are tasked with balancing socio-economic development; promoting business; protecting consumers; coordinating government agency activities; reviewing Gewog regulations and ordinances; and representing the Dzongkhags in national referendums. The Dzongkhag Tshogdus are empowered to enforce rules on health and public safety; to regulate environmental pollution, advertising in regard to environmental aesthetics; to regulate broadcast media in accordance with the Information, Communications, and Media Act; and to regulate gambling. Dzongkhag Tshogdus also bear the responsibility for their own finances. (Note: Local Gov't Act 2008: §§ 49–52, 216–229) The Dzongkhag Tshogdus also oversee Dzongdags (governors), royal appointees who are the executive of each Dzongkhag. Dzongdags, in turn, are responsible for maintaining law and order, and for enforcing the driglam namzha laws. (Note: Local Gov't Act 2008: §§ 250–264)

=== Gewog governments ===
The analogous body at the Gewog level is the Gewog Tshogde, composed of the Gup and Mangmi, plus five to eight more elected Tshogpas (councilmen). (Note: Local Gov't Act 2008: §§ 9–10) Gewog Tshogdes are, like Dzongkhag Tshogdus, responsible for enforcing rules on public health and safety and tasked with encouraging economic development. Gewog Tshogdes further regulate drinking and irrigation waters, mines, recreational areas, construction, land use, and agricultural activities in relation to the Forest and Nature Conservation Act. Gewog governments formulate five-year development plans, run their own budgets, and raise their own labor for public projects. These budgetary and developmental functions are subject to the approval and review of the Ministry of Finance. Gewog Tshogdes are empowered to levy taxes on land, buildings, cattle, grazing, entertainment, advertisement (other than in newspapers, print, radio, and internet), and anything else designated by parliament. (Note: Local Gov't Act 2008: §§ 53–60, 216–229)

=== Municipal governments ===
The Act of 2009 presents no substantive change from previous law regarding the Dzongkhag Tshogdu, Gewog Tshogde, terms of local offices, and qualifications for office. Subordinate municipal divisions, however, are completely re-written.

Under the Act of 2009, a senior decision making body is established for some Thromdes (municipalities), the lowest level of administration. This body, called the Thromde Tshogde, is composed of seven to ten elected members and headed by a Thrompon. Every Thromde is classified as one of two types: Dzongkhag Yenlag Thromde and Dzongkhag Thromde; the latter is further subdivided into Class B Thromde and Class A Thromde based on population, development, and economy. Class A, or highest developed, Thromdes are allowed their own elected Thromde Tshogde; Class B Thromdes and Yenlag Thromdes are governed directly by either the Dzongkhag or the Gewog administration. From time to time, Parliament decides the boundaries of Thromde in consultation with the National Land Commission Secretariat and local authorities. (Note: Local Gov't Act 2008: §§ 11–18, 85)

Thromde Tshogdes are empowered to regulate advertising, enforce public health and safety rules, and to levy taxes on land, property, property transfer (sales tax) and, "betterment." The municipal governments are also authorized to levy special taxes on vacant and underdeveloped land to encourage development, and to raise and spend money in to promote local economic development. (Note: Local Gov't Act 2008: §§ 61–65)

=== Other provisions ===
The Act of 2009 also codifies procedures for the dissolution of local governments, referenced but unspecified in previous legislation. Votes of confidence may be initiated by local populations when a written appeal convinces the Election Commission of Bhutan that more than half the population desires a poll. When the Commission approves a confidence poll, it is conducted within a month's time in the form of a yes–no question. At least two-thirds of any local population must vote "no" in order to dissolve the local government. Local governments, once dissolved, must be reconstituted within ninety days. (Note: Local Gov't Act 2008: §§ 36–47)

The Act of 2009 further provides a substantive and procedural framework for the roles and responsibilities of local government members, including conducting sessions and other business, voting, and record of proceedings and resolutions. (Note: Local Gov't Act 2008: §§ 86–140) It also mandates transparency and accountability through open sessions, public disclosure of information, and public participation. (Note: Local Gov't Act 2008: §§ 141–150) The Act of 2009 reforms offices within local bureaucracies, establishing secretariats at each level, creating a Thromde Executive Secretary, and allotting each bureaucracy with a staff of civil servants. (Note: Local Gov't Act 2008: §§ 230–249, 265–277)

In the Act of 2009, there is no reference whatever to Dungkhags and Chiwogs, sub-dzongkhags and sub-gewogs respectively, recognized up through the previous Act of 2007. Because the Act of 2009 repeals all previous legislation on local governments whether or not it conflicts, the legal status of Chiwogs is reduced to electoral districts, and Dungkhags are retained as judicial districts (Dungkhag Courts) as described in the Constitution of 2008. (Note: Local Gov't Act 2008: § 2)

== Historical acts and local governments ==
The Local Government Act of 2009 was preceded by the Local Government Act of 2007, the Thromde Act of 2007, (Note: Local Gov't Act 2008: § 2) the Dzongkhag Yargay Tshogdu Chathrim of 2002, Gewog Yargay Tshogchung Chathrim of 2002, the Bhutan Municipal Act 1999, and other legislation. All previous acts were repealed by the enactment of the Local Government Act of 2009. (Note: Local Gov't Act 2008: § 2)

Until 1956, Bhutan had nine provinces headed by the penlops: Byakar (centered in present-day Bumthang), Dukye, Haa, Paro, Punakha, Dagana, Thimphu, Trongsa, and Wangdue Phodrang. Later, the country was reorganized into dzongkhags. In August 1987, the territory of Gasa dzongkhag was divided between Punakha and Thimphu; Chhukha dzongkhag was formed by merging the parts of Samtse, Paro, and Thimphu. In 1992, Gasa dzongkhag was re-established and carved out from Punakha; the same year, Trashi Yangtse dzongkhag was carved out from Trashigang.

The Acts of 2002 (Dzongkhag Yargay Tshogdu Chathrim and Gewog Yargay Tshogchung Chathrim) established much of the basic legal framework for Dzongkhg and Gewog administration. This framework established offices and terms, election and meeting procedures, functions and regulatory powers, roles and responsibilities, and codes of conduct for local governments comparable to those that were re-codified in subsequent legislation.

The Local Government Act of 2007 authorized Dungkhags as intermediate divisions between Dzongkhags and Gewogs. These subdivisions were governed by Dungkhag Administration headed by a Dungpa. Under this Act, Gewogs were further subdivided into Chiwogs for Gewog administration. Aside from these legal subdivisions, the law of the Act of 2007 was largely retained, frequently verbatim, by the Act of 2009.

== See also ==
- Dzongkhag
- Dungkhag
- Gewog
- Chiwog
- Bhutanese legislation
- Law of Bhutan
- Elections in Bhutan
  - 2011 Bhutanese local government elections
- Bhutanese democracy
