= Bjacho Gewog =

Bjacho Gewog བྱག་ཕྱོགས་
- Gewogs
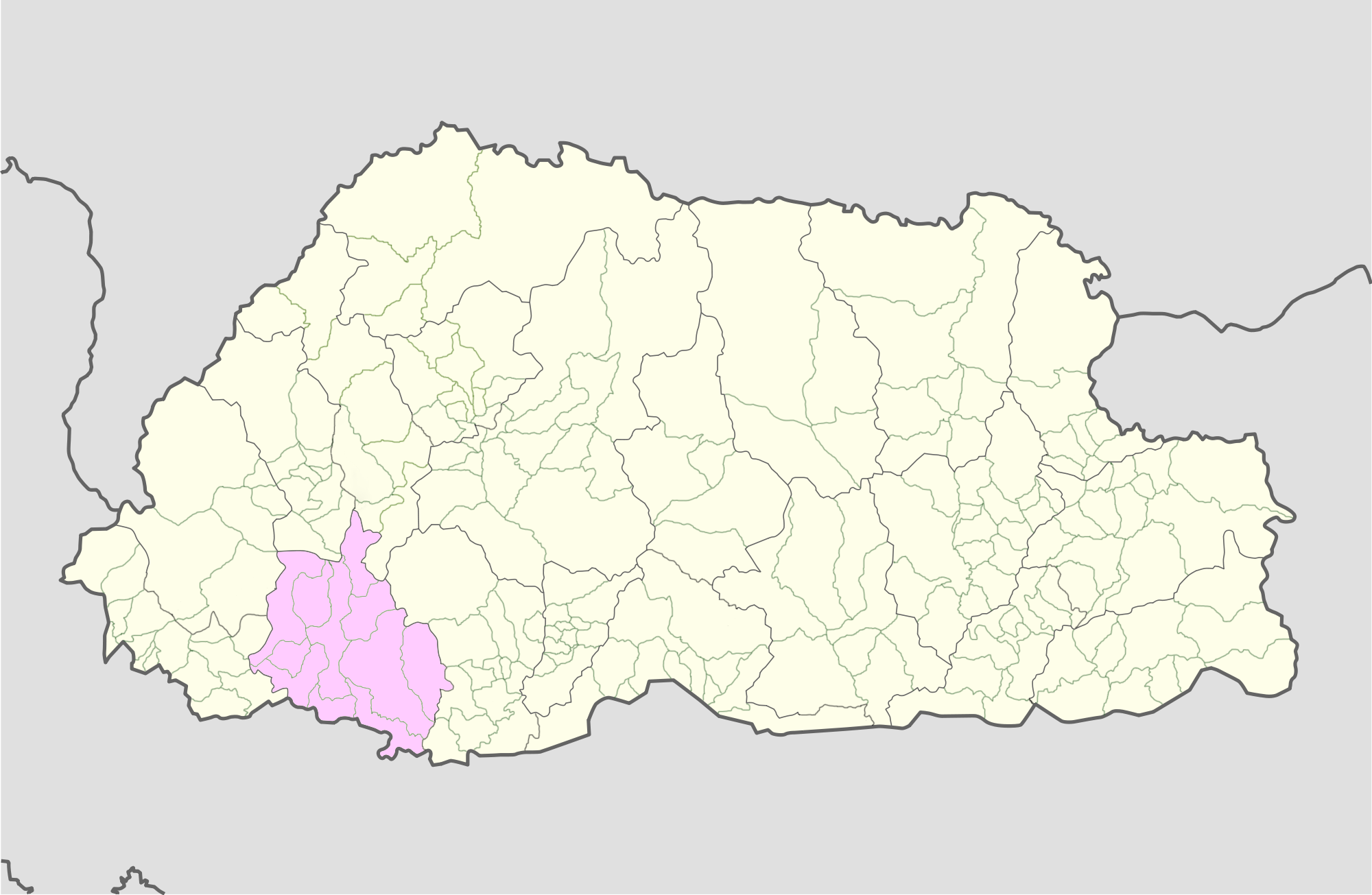
- Location within Chukha District
- Coordinates: 27°04′46″N 89°35′09″E
- Country: Bhutan
- District: Chukha District

Area
  - Total: 54 sq mi (140 km^{2})
- Time zone: UTC+6 (BTT)

Bjachho Gewog (Dzongkha: བྱག་ཕྱོགས་), also spelled Bjagchhog, is a gewog (village block) of Chukha District, Bhutan. The gewog has an area of 140 km² and contains 4 villages; Bjachho, Tsimakha, Mebesa and Wangkha.
