= Chang Gewog =

Chang Gewog ལྕང་
- Gewogs
- Country: Bhutan
- District: Thimphu District
- Time zone: UTC+6 (BTT)

Chang Gewog (Dzongkha: ལྕང་) is a gewog (village block) of Thimphu District, Bhutan.
