= Tshogdu =

Unicameral legislature of Bhutan, pre-2007

The Tshogdu (Dzongkha: ཚོགས་འདུ་; Wylie: tshogs-'du; "(Bhutanese Grand National Assembly)" was the unicameral legislature of Bhutan until 31 July 2007. The legislature had a total of 150 members. Dasho Ugen Dorje was the last President of the Tshogdu, with Nima Tshering the Secretary-General. It was replaced by the bicameral Parliament of Bhutan.

== Composition ==
The Tshogdu was originally composed of locally elected town representatives, religious representatives, and members nominated by the king, all of whom served a three-year term. At the time of its dissolution, there were 4 female and 146 male members.

Summary of the composition of the Bhutan Tshogdu
Appointment method	Seats
Members elected from village constituencies	106
Royally appointed members	10
Representatives of monk Body	10
Government appointed members	24
Total	150

== See also ==
- Parliament of Bhutan
  - National Assembly of Bhutan
  - National Council of Bhutan
- Prime Minister of Bhutan
- Government of Bhutan
