= Bhutanese nationality law =

Bhutanese Citizenship Act

Parliament of Bhutan
- Long title: An Act relating to Bhutanese citizenship
- Enacted by: Government of Bhutan
- Status: Current legislation

Bhutanese nationality law is the law governing the acquisition, transmission and loss of Bhutanese citizenship. The Bhutanese Citizenship Act of 1985 was introduced by the Druk Gyalpo Jigme Singye Wangchuck, on June 10, 1985, modifying the definition of a Bhutanese citizen. The Act was implemented as part of a new national policy of Driglam Namzha, national customs and etiquette. Because of its emphasis on Bhutanese culture, the Act is also referred to as the "One Nation, One People Act." The 1985 Act was amended by the Immigration Act of 2007 and then superseded in 2008 by the Constitution of Bhutan insofar as previous laws are inconsistent; where not inconsistent, the provisions of the 2007 Act, the 1985 Act, and previous Acts relating to immigration continue in effect.

== Provisions of the Citizenship Act of 1985 ==
The first article of the Act provides its name, its date of enactment, and that it supersedes any conflicting prior laws relating to citizenship. Namely, this Act superseded the Citizenship act of 1958 and Amendments of 1977.

=== Citizenship by birth and by registration ===
The second article of the Act provides Bhutanese citizenship to those whose parents are both Bhutanese citizens. (Cf. the 1958 Act which required only that one's father be Bhutanese) This article is an example of a jus sanguinis, or blood-based, nationality law. The article guarantees citizenship to children of two Bhutanese nationals as a matter of right.

The third article of the Act provides for citizenship by registration. It provides Bhutanese citizenship for persons who show that they were "permanently domiciled" in Bhutan by December 31, 1958, and that their name was registered in the yearly Census Register. The article guarantees citizenship by registration as a matter of right to those who meet the permanent domicile and census registration requirements.

=== Naturalization ===
The fourth article of the Act provides a substantive and procedural framework for naturalization. It requires applicants to submit application forms (forms KA-1 and KA-2, requesting general biographic and biometric information) and sets forth the conditions of eligibility for naturalization. Applicants with one Bhutanese parent must be at least 15 years of age and must have resided in Bhutan at least 15 years as indicated in the census register. Non-Bhutanese applicants must be at least 21 years of age and must have resided in Bhutan for at least 20 years as indicated in the census register, except government employees who need show a 15-year residency. (Cf. the 1958 Act which required only 10-year residency for all naturalization) All applicants must demonstrate soundness of mind; the ability to speak, read, and write Dzongkha proficiently; good knowledge of the culture, customs, traditions, and history of Bhutan; good moral character without any record of imprisonment for criminal offenses in Bhutan or elsewhere; no record of having spoken or acted against the King, country or people of Bhutan in any manner whatsoever; and preparedness to take a solemn oath of allegiance to the King, country and people of Bhutan. (Compare the 1958 Act, which imposed no official cultural requirements.)

Once an applicant's forms are submitted, the Ministry of Home Affairs conducts written and oral tests to assess applicants' proficiency in Dzongkha and knowledge of the culture, customs, tradition and history of Bhutan. The decision of the Ministry of Home Affairs on the question of eligibility for naturalization is stated as "final and binding". The government also reserves the right "to reject any application for naturalization without assigning any reason."

The fifth article of the Act requires applicants who have been favorably considered to take an oath of allegiance, with naturalization complete upon receipt of a Kashog from the King.

=== Deprivation of citizenship ===
The sixth article of the Act concerns termination of citizenship. It provides that Bhutanese citizens who acquire foreign citizenship cease to be citizens of Bhutan. The spouse and children of such persons – if themselves Bhutanese citizens – have the right to remain as citizens provided they are permanently domiciled in Bhutan and are registered annually in the Citizenship Register maintained by the Ministry of Home Affairs.

It also provides that the government may deprive naturalized Bhutanese citizens of their citizenship at any time if it finds that naturalization had been obtained by means of fraud, false representation, or the concealment of any material fact.

It also provides that the government may deprive naturalized Bhutanese citizens of their citizenship at any time if it finds that person has shown by act or speech to be disloyal in any manner whatsoever to the King, country or people of Bhutan.

Furthermore, it provides that children of two Bhutanese parents may lose their citizenship if their names are also not recorded in the Citizenship register maintained in the Ministry of Home Affairs, having left Bhutan voluntarily and without the knowledge of the government. (Resolution No. 16 (2) adopted by the National Assembly of Bhutan in its 62nd Session).

Finally, the sixth article provides that when the government deprives Bhutanese of their citizenship, they must dispose of all immovable property in Bhutan within one year, failing which, the property is confiscated by the Ministry of Home Affairs on payment of fair and reasonable compensation.

=== Implementation of the Act of 1985 ===
The first nationwide census was implemented from 1980. The largest group within the country affected by the enforcement were the Lhotshampa people; this group, a generalized term for those of Nepalese descent, comprised 43% of the total population of Bhutan in 1988 including all illegal aliens. Bhutanese security forces moved through the southern regions of the country, home to most of the Lhotshampas, forcing them from their homes and across the southern border with India, where they continued on into Nepal. Because most of the people exiled did not speak Dzongkha, they were classified as illegal aliens, thus able to be removed from the country. In total, between 100,000 and 150,000, one sixth of Bhutan's population in 1988, ended up in Nepal.

Nepal lacked adequate resources to independently deal with the inflow of refugees resultant of the citizenship act. With help from the United Nations, seven refugee camps were established in Nepal, within which 97% of occupants were Lhotshampas from Bhutan. Conflict arose between the two countries when the government of Bhutan would not admit liability for the situation, claiming that all the people in question were Nepalese citizens and thus for Nepal to handle.

External aid, provided by other governments besides that of Nepal, provides subsistence for the majority of refugees. Furthermore, several countries, including the United States and Canada, agreed to resettle a percent of the Lhotshampas who had UNHCR refugee status.

In 2003, an agreement was reached between Bhutan and Nepal, allowing for Bhutanese refugees still remaining in Nepal to return home with full rights of citizenship. However, this has gone largely unnoticed due to shifts occurring with Bhutan's political makeup. The century's old monarchical country, beginning with King Jigme Singye Wangchuck's abdication in 2006 and his son's taking over of the throne, is transitioning to a constitutional monarchy and democratic state. Amidst this ordered chaos, the status of the Lhotshampas has been pushed further back on the political agenda.

== Provisions of the Immigration Act of 2007 ==
The Immigration Act of 2007 amends and supplements the Citizenship Act of 1985. It was enacted by Parliament on January 5, 2007, and came into effect on February 20, 2007. It established a Department of Immigration under the Ministry of Home and Cultural Affairs to implement and administer its provisions through immigration offices. It endowed immigration officers of the Department of Immigration with both police and prosecution powers. Immigration officers were also delegated immigrations and customs enforcement powers: they were accorded the right to enter any private or official premises in order to search, arrest, seize, detain, interrogate or to demand forfeiture of any vehicles, trains, vessels, aircraft, or goods in accordance with the laws. Immigration officers were immunized from all wrongful acts or omissions committed in good faith in the discharge of their duties. Along with immigration officers, the Royal Court of Justice is specifically provided powers to enforce the Act. Rulemaking and regulatory authority is vested in the Ministry of Home and Cultural Affairs regarding any matter for the purpose of giving effect to the provisions of the Act.

=== Immigration categories ===
The Act of 2007 divides aliens into two categories: immigrants and non-immigrants. Immigrants, in turn, are divided into five categories: women married to Bhutanese men and who hold a Special Residence Permit; the children of Bhutanese women married to foreign men, who hold a Special Residence Permit; those married to a Bhutanese citizen, or the children of such parentage, who holds an Immigration Card; holders of green cards or refugee cards; and holders of Trader Cards.

The first two categories of immigrants, who hold Special Residence Permits, are allowed free movement and residence within Bhutan. Green Card or Refugee Card holders are permitted to stay until such time as may be decided by the Government, but may similarly move freely within Bhutan. Those holding an Immigration Card are provided with stay permit on a periodical basis as decided by the government and must register their residence and obtain route permits to travel outside designated areas. Holders of Trader Cards are permitted to stay and conduct business in designated commercial centers, and must obtain route permits for movement outside their designated place of residence.

Employment visas may not be issued to an immigrant until the consular officer receives a determination made by the Ministry of Home and Cultural Affairs.

Non-immigrants lack intent to immigrate, and may therefore stay in Bhutan for a maximum of three years. Generally, two types of employment visas are allowed for non-immigrants: visas for "highly skilled, professional and technical experts;" and visas for "skilled and technical workers." Foreign unskilled labor is illegal under the Act.

The department maintains a record of each immigrant and non-immigrant within Bhutan.

=== Admissibility ===
Admissibility requirements are set forth depending on the type of alien. Visitors, visitors in transit, students, skilled workers, overseas employees, foreign airline employees, and businesspersons all have different requirements for admissibility. Most often, these differences are in duration, intent (not) to work, and intent (not) to immigrate.

Inadmissibility for entry is also defined in the Act. One who is under order of deportation or exclusion or fails to produce proper travel or medical documents or other proof as required by an immigration officer. One may also be found inadmissible based foreign policy, national security, poor health, or criminal record. Intending to proselytize or otherwise disrupt Bhutanese culture also makes one inadmissible. Gaining entry into Bhutan illegally, through fraud, deception, or material omission are also grounds for inadmissibility; entry through points other than designated ports is deemed an illegal immigrant regardless of being otherwise admissible or holding a visa.

For all aliens, registration is required to maintain status. These records are confidential.

=== Visas ===
The Act of 2007 also provides four categories of visas: diplomatic visas; official visas; ordinary/tourist visas; and gratis visas. Visas may authorize single, double, triple, or multiple entries into Bhutan. Visa fees are also authorized.

Diplomatic visas are for ambassadors, high-level government representatives, reigning royalty, and representatives of international organizations. Official visas are for other official guests and professionals working internationally, including business visitors seeking to attend Government-sponsored symposia and conferences. Ordinary visas are for tourists, private visitors, businesspersons, journalists, consultants, and other qualified professionals. Gratis visas categories are not described by the Act. Other categories of visa mentioned but not enumerated include business, transit, and student visas.

Diplomatic, official, and gratis visas are valid for a maximum of ninety days after entry; ordinary visas are valid for thirty days after entry. Tourist visas are allowed a maximum of ninety days. (Note: The tourist visa is stated as an "ordinary visa;" the maximum allotments are inconsistent within the Act.) Foreign workers are issued visas with validity depending upon the terms of their assignment. Business visas are issued for one year or more with multiple entries. Student visas are issued for the duration of the academic course or for five years, whichever is less, on the basis of firm letters of admission from an academic institution recognized by the government. Transit visas are issued for a maximum of forty-eight hours with single entry facility only.

Extension on visas may be granted only on grounds of illness as an exceptional case, not to exceed 15 days at a time. However, no extension is possible for those who fail to register properly.

=== Inspection, detention, and removal ===
The Act of 2007 provides for the inspection of all foreigners seeking admission into Bhutan. It also provides for spot checking in public and "regular field inspections in all residential, commercial, private and official premises to expose illegal immigrants and unauthorized foreign workers." During inspection, permission to enter may be suspended.

The Act of 2007 also provides a substantive and procedural framework for the detention and removal of foreigners from Bhutan. The Department may, for reasonable and sufficient cause, cancel or revoke permission to be present. The burden falls on the applicant to prove eligibility for admission or remaining in Bhutan. Removal proceedings for those who enter illegally or remain unlawfully begin with notice from the department. Aliens are allowed to depart voluntarily within fifteen days so long as they establish they have not been involved in any criminal activities; have no financial dues payable; have means to depart, by clear and convincing evidence; intend to depart; and have no court cases pending. Those who have broken the law are subject to detention for the duration of removal proceedings. The costs of removal are to be born by the parties who bring the foreigners into Bhutan.

=== Immigration-related offences ===
The Act of 2007 criminalizes refusal to register, deception, and obstruction of immigration authorities by anyone. The Act also makes it a felony to hire, transport, harbor, or furnish illegal or inadmissible immigrants with improper documentation. Falsely representing oneself as Bhutanese to receive benefits is a misdemeanor, as are misrepresentations in pursuit of a visa and concealing the presence of unauthorized persons. The Act provides strict liability for those who bring unauthorized foreigners into Bhutan despite whatever due diligence they may have exercised. Knowingly or willfully doing so, however, is a fourth degree felony, along with transporting those foreigners within Bhutan and tampering with travel documents. Creating false travel records, as well as falsifying authorization, are third degree felonies. Fines and other penalties are meted according to the Penal Code as well as regulations under it and the Act of 2007.

=== Miscellaneous section ===
The Act of 2007 sets forth obligations for Bhutanese agencies and individuals as well as foreigners. Hoteliers, tour operators, contractors, employers of foreign workers, and all other individuals are bound "to consciously adhere to and apply the provisions" of the Act. All employers and managers of hotels of agencies, as well as Bhutanese doing business with foreigners, have an affirmative duty to maintain records to be produced to immigration officers on request for periodic examination.

Foreigners must abide by Bhutanese laws and respect the social norms, tradition, customs, culture and religion of Bhutan. They have the right to be protected by the laws of the Bhutan.

== Travel freedom ==
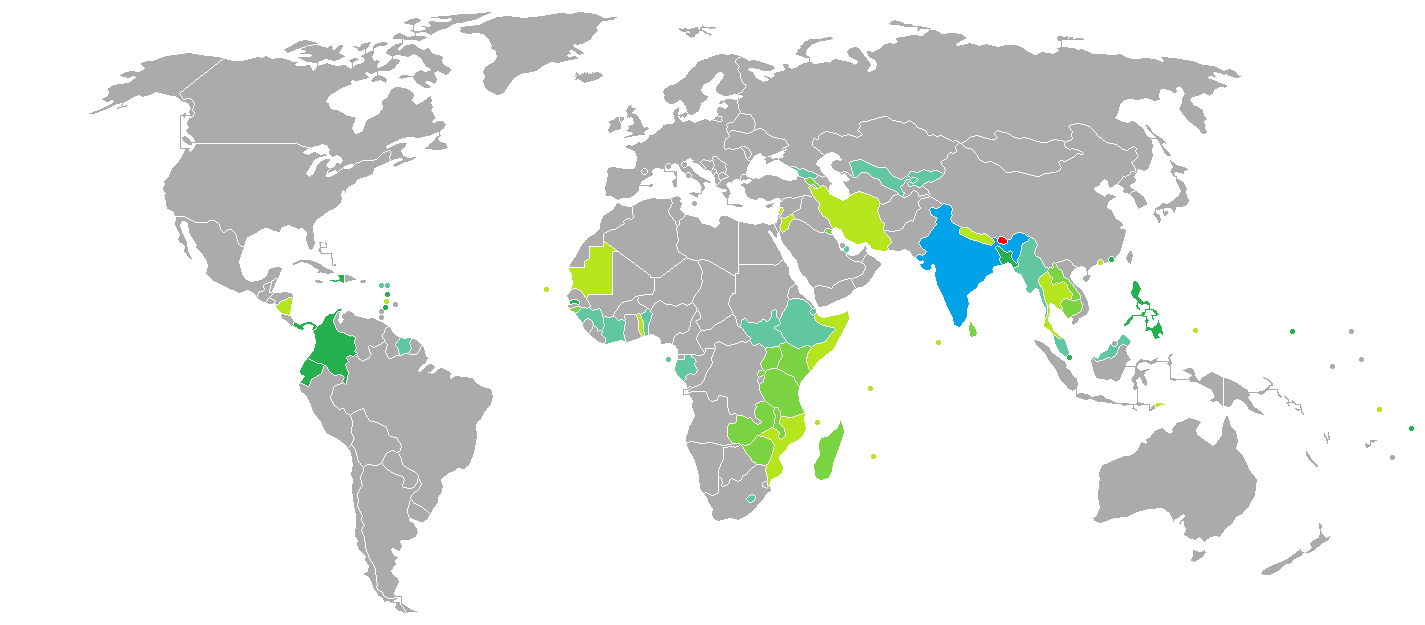
Visa requirements for Bhutanese citizens

In 2016, Bhutanese citizens had visa-free or visa on arrival access to 51 countries and territories, ranking the Bhutanese passport 86th in the world according to the Visa Restrictions Index.

== See also ==
- Constitution of Bhutan
- Bhutanese Citizenship Act 1958
- Immigration in Bhutan
- Law of Bhutan
- Bhutanese legislation
- Politics of Bhutan
- Bhutanese refugees
- Nationality law
