= Bhutanese legislation =

Bhutanese legislation is created by the bicameral Parliament of Bhutan. Either the Monarch Druk Gyalpo or the non-partisan house National Council or the seat of the Government National Assembly may admit bills into Parliament to be passed as acts, with the exception of money and financial bills, which are the sole purview of the National Assembly. When a bill has been introduced and passed by one house, it must present the bill to the other house within thirty days from the date of passing, and the bill may be passed during the next session of Parliament. In the case of budget bills and urgent matters, a bill must be passed in the same session of Parliament.

Once bills have passed Parliament, they are submitted to the King for royal assent within fifteen days.

If the other house neither passes nor returns the bill by the end of the next session, the bill is deemed to have passed, and the house in which the bill originated shall present the bill within fifteen days to the King for assent.

If the King does not grant assent to the bill, he returns the bill with amendments or objections for Parliament to deliberate and vote on the bill in a joint sitting. After Parliament deliberates and passes the bill in a joint sitting, Parliament resubmits the bill to the Druk Gyalpo who must then grant assent to the bill.

Acts passed predating the enactment of the Constitution in 2008 were passed under different procedures, some originating as promulgations by the King as indicated in their preamble. Below is a list of acts of the Kingdom of Bhutan.

== List of acts of the Kingdom of Bhutan ==
Order (Note: The official order is reversed; this ordering allows additions without renumbering.)	Act	Year	English	Dzongkha
88	Anti-Corruption Act, 2011	2011		
87	Royal Monetary Authority Act	2010	English and Dzongkha	
86	Tobacco Control Act	2010	English and Dzongkha	
85	Entitlement & Service Conditions Act for the Holders, Members & Commissioners of Constitutional Offices	2010	English and Dzongkha	
84	Bhutan Standards Act	2010	English and Dzongkha	
83	Local Government Act	2009	English and Dzongkha	
82	Cooperative (Amendment) Act	2009	English	Dzongkha
81	Prison Act	2009	English and Dzongkha	
80	Royal Bhutan Police Act	2009	English and Dzongkha	
79	Constitution of the Kingdom of Bhutan	2008	English	Dzongkha
78	Election Act of the Kingdom of Bhutan	2008	English	Dzongkha
77	National Council Act	2008	English	Dzongkha
76	National Assembly Act	2008	English	Dzongkha
75	National Referendum Act	2008	(unavailable)	Dzongkha
74	Public Election Fund Act	2008	English	Dzongkha
73	Parliamentary Entitlements Act	2008	English	Dzongkha
72	Land Act	2007	English	Dzongkha
71	Civil Society Organizations Act	2007	English	Dzongkha
70	Immigration Act	2007	English	Dzongkha
69	Judicial Service Act	2007	English	(unavailable)
68	Labour and Employment Act	2007	English and Dzongkha	
67	Natural Environment Protection Act	2007	English	Dzongkha
66	Public Finance Act	2007	English	Dzongkha
65	Religious Organizations Act	2007	English	Dzongkha
64	Local Governments Act (Note: The Local Governments Act of 2007 was repealed by the Local Government Act of 2009.)	2007	English and Dzongkha	
63	Anti Corruption Act	2006	English	Dzongkha
62	Audit Act	2006	English	Dzongkha
61	Bhutan Information Communications & Media Act	2006	English	Dzongkha
60	Office of the Attorney General Act	2006	English	Dzongkha
59	Evidence Act	2005	English	(unavailable)
58	Food Act	2005	English	(unavailable)
57	Movable Cultural Property Act	2005	English	Dzongkha
56	Narcotic Drugs, Psychotropic Substances and Substance Abuse Act	2005	English	Dzongkha
55	Penal Code of the Kingdom of Bhutan	2004	English	Dzongkha
54	Road Act	2004	English	Dzongkha
53	Tenancy Act	2004	English	Dzongkha
52	National Assembly Committees Act	2004	English	(unavailable)
51	National Assembly Speakers Act	2004	English	(unavailable)
50	Biodiversity Act	2003	English	(unavailable)
49	Jabmi Act	2003	English	(unavailable)
48	Medicines Act	2003	English	Dzongkha
47	Dzongkhag Yargay Tshogdu Act (Note: The Dzongkhag Yargay Tshogdu Act was repealed by the Local Governments Act of 2007, which was in turn repealed by the Local Government Act of 2009.)	2002	English	Dzongkha
46	Geog Yargay Tshogchhung Act (Note: The Geog Yargay Tshogchhung Act was repealed by the Local Governments Act of 2007, which was in turn repealed by the Local Government Act of 2009.)	2002	English	Dzongkha
45	Medical and Health Council Act	2002	English	Dzongkha
44	Civil and Criminal Procedure Code	2001	English	Dzongkha
43	Commercial Sale of Goods Act	2001	English	(unavailable)
42	Co-operative Act	2001	English	Dzongkha
41	Copyright Act	2001	English	(unavailable)
40	Electricity Act	2001	English	(unavailable)
39	Income Tax Act	2001	English	(unavailable)
38	Industrial Property Act	2001	English	(unavailable)
37	Livestock Act	2001	English	(unavailable)
36	Civil Aviation Act	2000	English	Dzongkha
35	Companies Act	2000	English	(unavailable)
34	Environmental Assessment Act	2000	English	Dzongkha
33	Pesticides Act	2000	English	Dzongkha
32	Sales Tax, Customs and Excise Act	2000	English	(unavailable)
31	Seeds Act	2000	English	Dzongkha
30	Bankruptcy Act	1999	English	Dzongkha
29	Bhutan Municipal Act	1999	English	Dzongkha
28	Bhutan Postal Corporation Act	1999	English	Dzongkha
27	Legal Deposit Act	1999	English	Dzongkha
26	Lhengye Zhungtsho Act	1999	English	Dzongkha
25	Movable and Immovable Property Act	1999	English	(unavailable)
24	Road Safety and Transport Act	1999	English	(unavailable)
23	Zhapto Lemi Chhathrim	1996	English	(unavailable)
22	Forest and Nature Conservation Act	1995	English	(unavailable)
21	Mines and Mineral Management Act	1995	English	Dzongkha
20	Census Handbook	1993	English	(unavailable)
19	Plant Quarantine Act	1993	English	(unavailable)
18	Financial Institutions Act	1992	English	(unavailable)
17	National Security Act	1992	English	Dzongkha
16	Extradition Act	1991	English	(unavailable)
15	Fire Arms and Ammunition Act	1990	English	Dzongkha
14	Bhutan Citizen Act	1985	English	(unavailable)
13	Prison Act (Note: The Prison Act of 1982 was repealed by the Prison Act of 2009.)	1982	English	Dzongkha
12	Royal Monetary Authority of Bhutan Act	1982	English	(unavailable)
11	Loan Act	1981	(unavailable)	Dzongkha
10	Inheritance Act	1980	English	Dzongkha
9	Livestock Act	1980	(unavailable)	Dzongkha
8	Marriage Act	1980	English	(unavailable)
7	Royal Bhutan Police Act (Note: The Royal Bhutan Police Act of 1980 was repealed in its entirety by the Royal Bhutan Police Act of 2009.)	1980	(unavailable)	Dzongkha
6	Land Act	1979	(unavailable)	Dzongkha
5	Bhutan Citizen Act	1977	English	(unavailable)
4	National Flag Rules	1972	English	(unavailable)
3	Kadyon	1969	(unavailable)	Dzongkha
2	Nationality Law	1958	English	(unavailable)
1	Thrimzhung Chhenmo (Note: The Thrimzhung Chhenmo established the National Assembly and the Royal Advisory Council, which was replaced by the National Council in 2008.)	1953	(unavailable)	Dzongkha

== See also ==
- Parliament of Bhutan
  - National Council of Bhutan
  - National Assembly of Bhutan
- Law of Bhutan
- Constitution of Bhutan
