= Districts of Bhutan =

Administrative and judicial district of Bhutan

A map of Bhutan showing its 20 dzongkhags

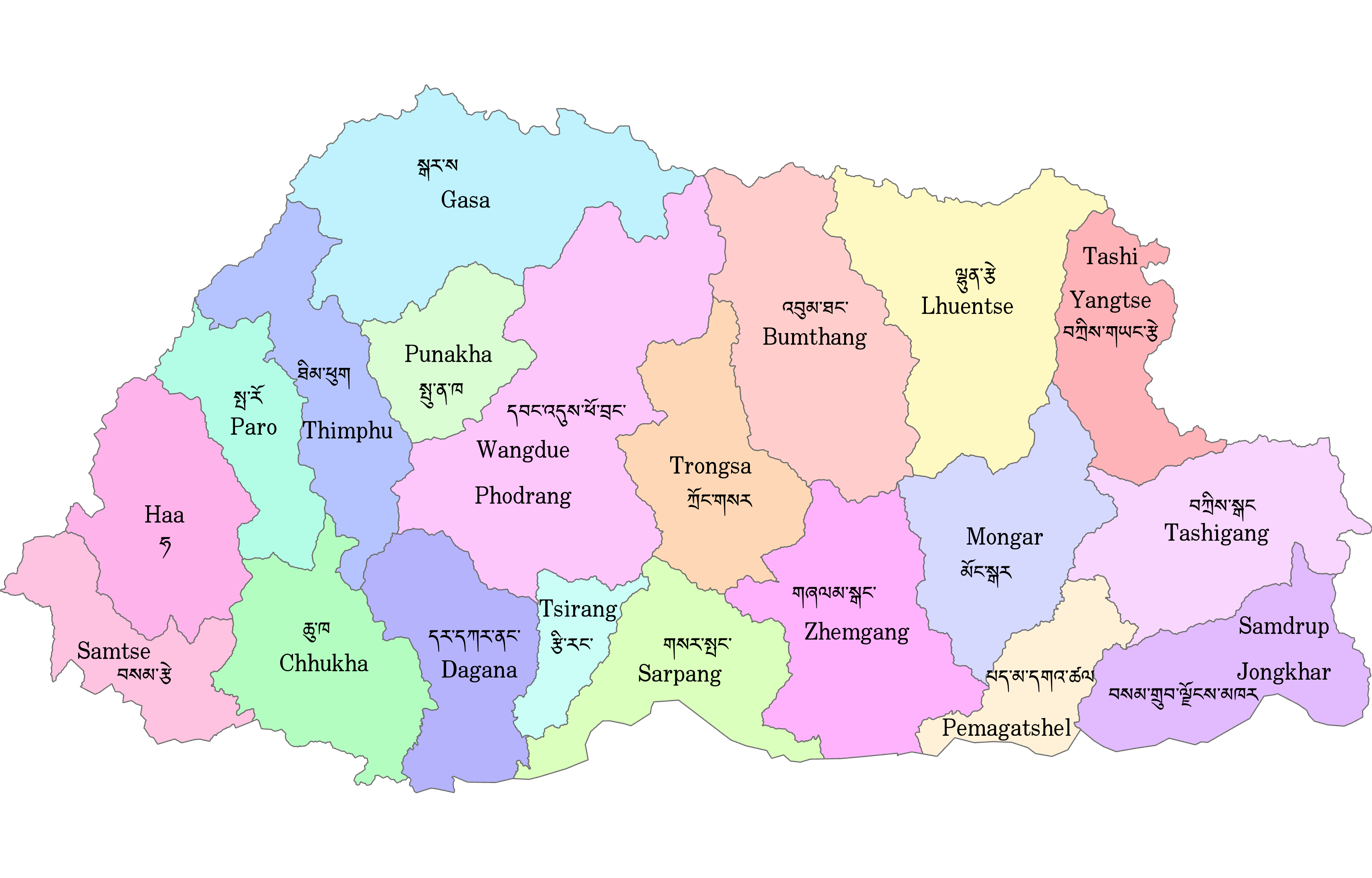
A map of Bhutan showing its 20 dzongkhags in Dzongkha

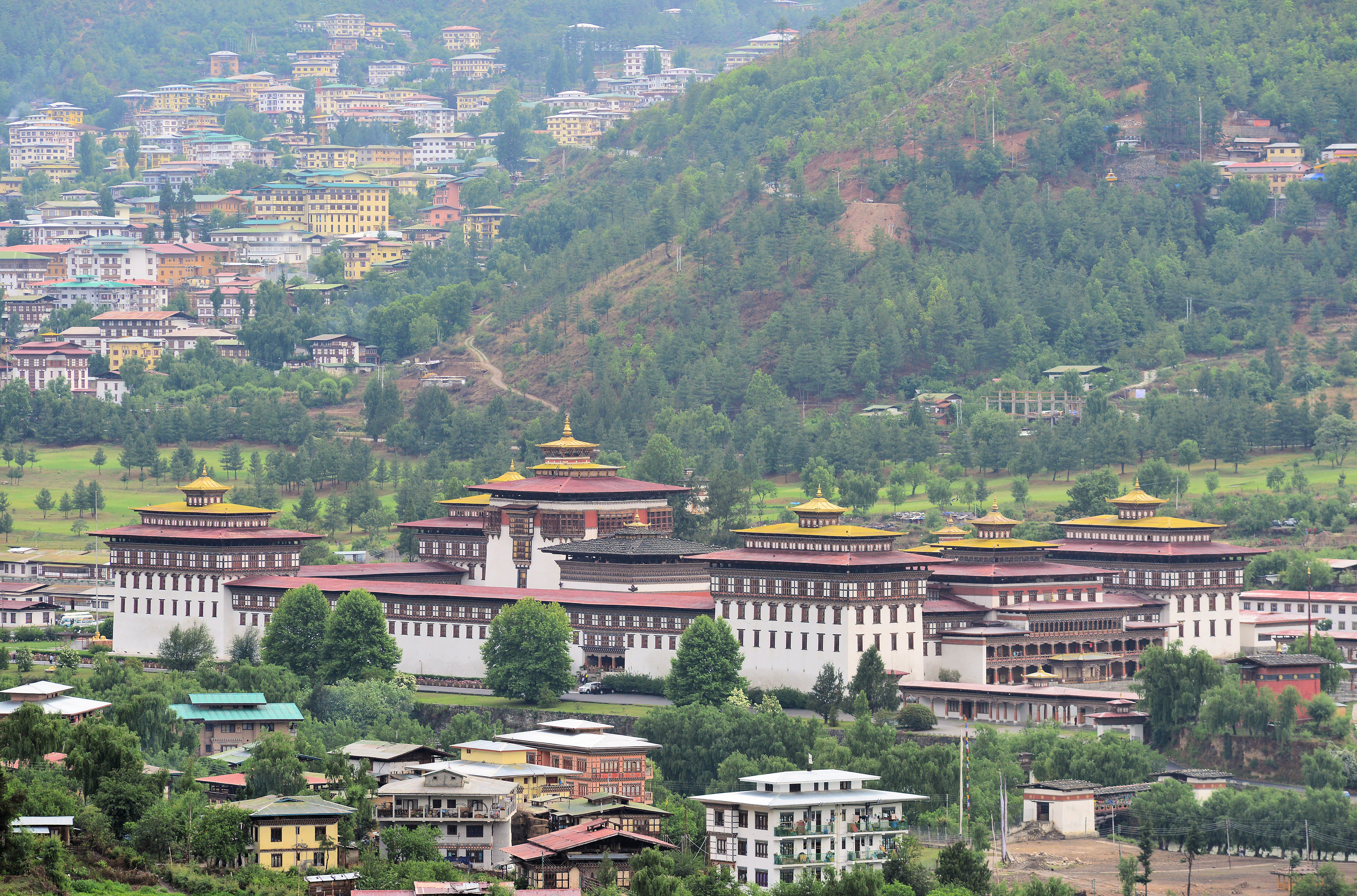
View of Tashichho Dzong in Thimphu, the largest dzongkhag in Bhutan by population

The Kingdom of Bhutan is divided into 20 districts (Dzongkha: dzongkhags). Bhutan is located between the Tibet Autonomous Region of China and India on the eastern slopes of the Himalayas in South Asia.

Dzongkhags are the primary subdivisions of Bhutan. They possess a number of powers and rights under the Constitution of Bhutan, such as regulating commerce, running elections, and creating local governments. The Local Government Act of 2009 established local governments in each of the 20 dzongkhags overseen by the Ministry of Home and Cultural Affairs. Each dzongkhag has its own elected government with non-legislative executive powers, called a dzongkhag tshogdu (district council). The dzongkhag tshogdu is assisted by the dzongkhag administration headed by a dzongdag (royal appointees who are the chief executive officer of each dzongkhag). Each dzongkhag also has a dzongkhag court presided over by a dzongkhag drangpon (judge), who is appointed by the Chief Justice of Bhutan on the advice of Royal Judicial Service Council. The dzongkhags, and their residents, are represented in the Parliament of Bhutan, a bicameral legislature consisting of the National Council and the National Assembly. Each dzongkhag has one National Council representative. National Assembly representatives are distributed among the dzongkhags in proportion to their registered voter population as recommended by the Delimitation Commission, provided that "no dzongkhag shall have less than two and more than seven National Assembly constituencies."

As of the 2017 census, Thimphu is the most populous dzongkhag, with 138,736 residents; Gasa is the least populous, with 3,952 residents. Thimphu is the most densely populated, with 67.1 people per square kilometre (174/sq mi), whereas Gasa is the least densely populated, with 1.3 people per square kilometre (3.4/sq mi). The largest dzongkhag by land area is Wangdue Phodrang, encompassing 4,308 km^{2} (1,663 sq mi), while the smallest is Tsirang, encompassing 639 km^{2} (247 sq mi).

== History ==
Medieval Bhutan was organized into provinces or regions headquartered in dzongs (castles/fortresses) which served as administrative centres for areas around them. The dzongs of Paro, Dagana and Trongsa were headed by penlops (provincial lords/governors) while other dzongs were headed by dzongpons (fortress lords). Penlops and dzongpons gained power as the increasingly dysfunctional dual system of government eventually collapsed amid civil war. The victorious Penlop of Trongsa Ugyen Wangchuck gained de jure sovereignty over the entire realm in 1907, marking the establishment of the modern Kingdom of Bhutan and the ascendancy of the House of Wangchuck.

At the direction of the fourth Druk Gyalpo (Bhutan head of state), Jigme Singye Wangchuk, the process of decentralisation of local administration started in 1981 with the formation of a dzongkhag yargye tshogchung (DYT, district development committee) in each of the newly created dzongkhags.

Four dzongdeys (zones) were established in 1988 and 1989: Zone I, including four western districts, seated at Chhukha; Zone II, including four west-central districts, seated at Damphu; Zone III, including four east-central districts, seated at Geylegphug; and Zone IV, including five eastern districts, seated at Yonphula; to "provide a more efficient distribution of personnel and administrative and technical skills." Dzongdeys acted as the intermediary administrative divisions between the dzongkhag administration and the central government. Although Thimphu dzongkhag and Thimphu thromde (municipality) were within the boundaries of Zone I, they stayed outside the zonal system. By 1991, however, only Eastern dzongdey (Zone IV) was fully functional. Zone I, Zone II and Zone III were "indefinitely" disabled in early 1991. Zone IV also ceased to function in mid-1992. Dzongdeys slowly lost relevance and went defunct as they were not included in the Constitution of Bhutan and the Local Government Act of 2009, which repealed the previous local governments and administrative divisions.

Under the Dzongkhag Yargay Tshogdu Chathrim (District Development Council Act) of 2002, a dzongdag (administrator), assisted by a dzongrab (deputy district collector), carry out administrative activities, while the DYT coordinates all developmental activities within the dzongkhag. Each DYT includes representatives of the municipalities and the towns within the dzongkhag, who elect a chairperson from among themselves. The DYTs also had non-voting members, which included the dzongdag, the dungpa (dungkhag (sub-district) head) (where a dungkhag exists) and the dzongkhag officials from various sectors such as the chief engineer, and the planning, finance, education, agriculture, forestry, animal husbandry, and health officers.

The Constitution of 2008 laid basic provisions for an elected dzongkhag tshogdu and dzongkhag courts in each dzongkhag. The Local Government Act of 2009 further codified the election process of dzongkhag tshogdu, the appointment process of dzongkdag, and the role of dzongkhag courts within the judicial system of Bhutan. It also repealed all previous acts and laws regarding local governments, including the Dzongkhag Yargay Tshogdu Chathrim of 2002.

== Political structure ==
Under the Local Government Act of 2009, the dzongkhag tshogdu is the non-legislative executive body of the dzongkhag, composed of the gup (gewog head) and the mangmi (elected representatives of the gewogs) from each gewog (block of villages), and representatives from the thromdes of that dzongkhag. They are empowered to enforce rules on health and public safety, regulate environmental pollution, advertise in regard to environmental aesthetics, regulate broadcast media in accordance with the Information, Communications, and Media Act, regulate gambling, and raise their own funds. They also oversee the dzongdag. A dzongdag, in turn, is responsible for maintaining law and order, and for enforcing the driglam namzha (rules for disciplined behavior).

== Dzongkhags ==
Dzongdeys of Bhutan Zone I Zone II Zone III Zone IV

Name	Population (2017) (Note: All data is taken from the 2017 Population and Housing Census of Bhutan.)	Population (2005)	Change	Land area (km^{2})	Population density	Number of National Assembly representatives (Note: Each dzongkhag is entitled to at least two, but no more than seven National Assembly constituencies. Currently, the number of National Assembly constituencies is 47. Each dzongkhag is also entitled to one National Council constituency.)	Number of Gewogs	Dzongdey
Bumthang	17,820	16,116	+10.6%	2,717	6.6/km^{2}	2	4	South
Chhukha (Note: Also spelled as "Chukha")	68,966	74,387	−7.3%	1,880	36.7/km^{2}	2	11	West
Dagana	24,965	18,222	+37.0%	1,723	14.5/km^{2}	2	14	Central
Gasa	3,952	3,116	+26.8%	3,118	1.3/km^{2}	2	4	Central
Haa	13,655	11,648	+17.2%	1,905	7.2/km^{2}	2	6	West
Lhuentse (Note: Also spelled as "Lhuntse")	14,437	15,395	−6.2%	1,944	7.4/km^{2}	2	8	East
Mongar (Note: Also spelled as "Monggar".)	37,150	37,069	+0.2%	2,859	13.0/km^{2}	3	17	East
Paro	46,316	36,433	+27.1%	1,293	35.8/km^{2}	2	10	West
Pemagatshel (Note: Also spelled as "Pema Gatshel")	23,632	13,864	+70.5%	1,030	22.9/km^{2}	3	11	East
Punakha	28,740	17,715	+62.2%	1,110	25.9/km^{2}	2	11	Central
Samdrup Jongkhar (Note: Also spelled as "Samdrupjongkhar")	35,079	39,961	−12.2%	1,878	18.7/km^{2}	2	11	East
Samtse	62,590	60,100	+4.1%	1,305	48.0/km^{2}	4	15	West
Sarpang	46,004	41,549	+10.7%	1,946	23.6/km^{2}	2	12	South
Thimphu	138,736	98,676	+40.6%	2,067	67.1/km^{2}	2	8	West
Trashigang	45,518	51,134	−11.0%	3,066	14.8/km^{2}	5	15	East
Trashiyangtse (Note: Also spelled as "Trashi Yangtse")	17,300	17,740	−2.5%	1,438	12.0/km^{2}	2	8	East
Trongsa	19,960	13,419	+48.7%	1,807	11.0/km^{2}	2	5	South
Tsirang	22,376	18,667	+19.9%	639	35.0/km^{2}	2	12	Central
Wangdue Phodrang (Note: Also spelled as "Wangduephodrang")	42,186	31,135	+35.5%	4,308	9.8/km^{2}	2	15	Central
Zhemgang	17,763	18,636	−4.7%	2,421	7.3/km^{2}	2	8	South
Bhutan	727,145	634,982	+14.5%	38,394	18.9/km^{2}	47	205	

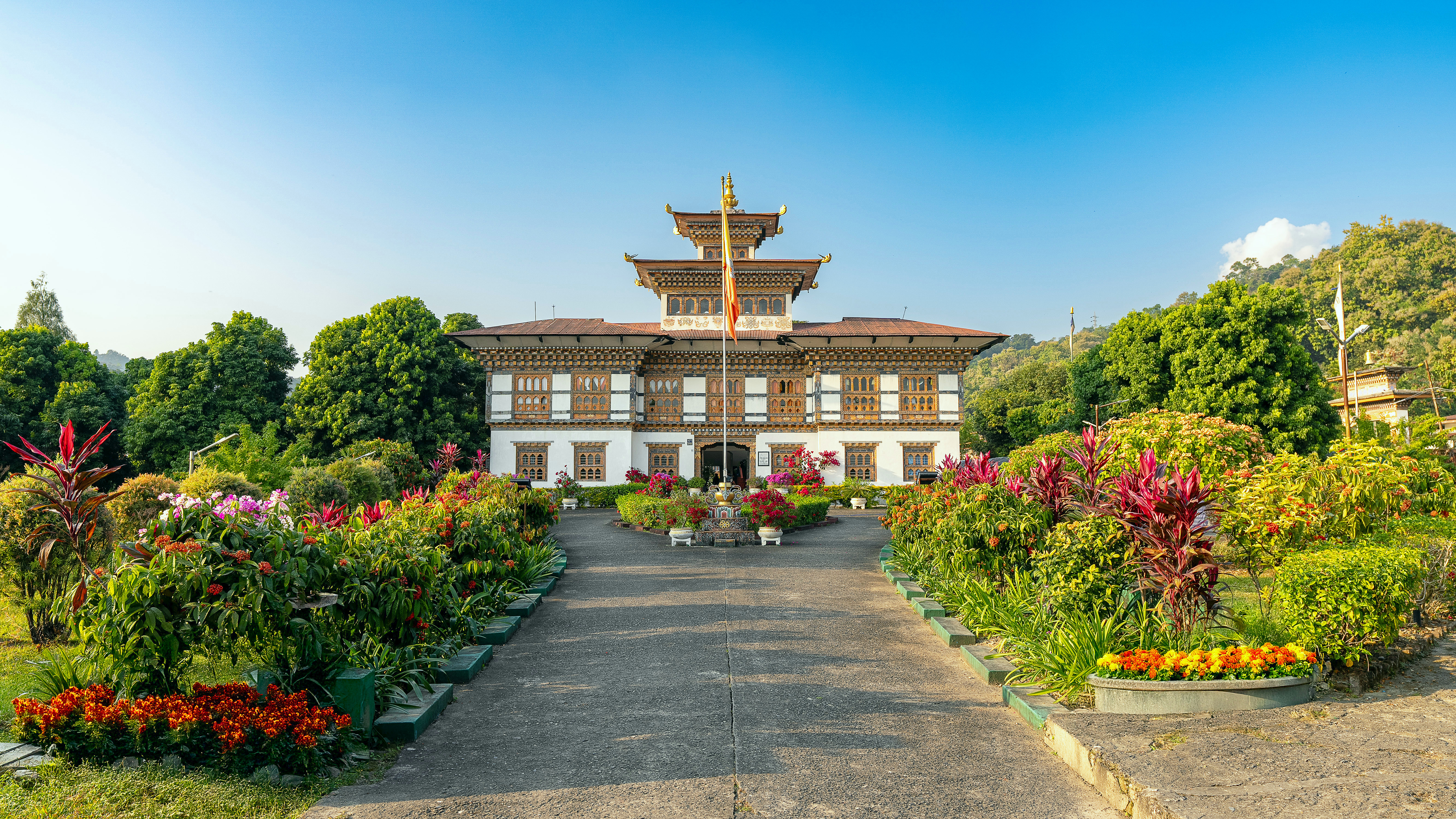
Dzongkhag Administration Office, Samdrup Jongkhar

== See also ==
- ISO 3166-2:BT
