= Freedom of religion in Bhutan =

The Bhutanese Constitution of 2008 and previous law provide for freedom of religion in Bhutan; however, the government has limited non-Buddhist missionary activity, barring non-Buddhist missionaries from entering the country, limiting construction of non-Buddhist religious buildings, and restricting the celebration of some non-Buddhist religious festivals.

== Overview ==
Drukpa Kagyu (Mahayana) Buddhism is the state religion, although in the southern areas many citizens openly practice Hinduism. Since the year 2015 Hinduism is also considered as a national religion of country.

Societal and governmental pressure for conformity with Buddhist norms is prevalent.

In 2022, Freedom House rated Bhutan’s religious freedom as 2 out of 4, noting that the constitution protects freedom of religion, but local authorities are known to harass non-Buddhists and people have experienced pressure to participate in Buddhist ceremonies and practices.

In 2026, The United Kingdom branch of Christian organisation Open Doors ranked the country as the 34th worst place in the world to be a Christian.

== Religious demography ==
The official religion in Bhutan is Buddhism, which is practiced by between 74% of the population; the rest of the population is mainly Hindu.

Approximately two-thirds to three-quarters of the population practice Drukpa Kagyu or Nyingma Buddhism, both of which are disciplines of Mahayana Buddhism. Approximately one-quarter of the population are ethnic Nepalese and practice Hinduism. They live mainly in the south and follow the Shaivite, Vaishnavite, Shakta, Ganapatya, Puranic, and Vedic schools. Christians both Roman Catholic and Protestant and nonreligious groups comprised less than one percent of the population. Bön, the country's animist and shamanistic belief system, revolves around the worship of nature and predates Buddhism. Very few citizens adhere exclusively to this religious group.

In 2021, the population was estimated at 857,000. According to a 2012 report by the Pew Research Center, approximately 75% of the population follows Buddhism and 23% are Hindu. Hindus reside mostly in southern areas adjacent to India.

The 2020 report by the World Christian Database estimated that Buddhists comprised 83% of the population and Hindus 11% in 2019.

The 2012 Pew Research Center report estimates of the size of the Christian community ranges from 0.5% to 3.5% of the total population. The Open Doors report covering 2021 estimates the Christian population at 30,000 (approximately 3.5 percent). Most Christians reside in urban areas in the south of the country

== Legal framework ==
The most authoritative law regarding religious freedom in Bhutan is its Constitution. Other ancillary acts of Bhutanese legislation provide the substantive and procedural framework to ensure religious freedom and regulate religious bodies. Religious freedom in Bhutan is shaped by the evolving laws and policies of the Bhutanese government regarding discrimination, organizations, national security and social order, and family law. Although Bhutan’s National Assembly had banned open practice of non-Buddhist and non-Hindu religions by passing resolutions in 1969 and in 1979, the current legal framework on its face unequivocally provides religious freedom for all.

=== Constitution ===
The Constitution of 2008 affirms the Drukpa Kagyu sect as the state religion, though it designates the King of Bhutan as the protector of all religions in Bhutan. (Note: Constitution: Art. 3, §§ 1, 2) Under Bhutan's current constitutional framework, freedom of religion is guaranteed; however, the Constitution places limits on political activity by religious figures and on proselytism.

Under the Constitution, religious institutions and personalities have a duty "to promote the spiritual heritage of the country while also ensuring that religion remains separate from politics" and that religious institutions and personalities remain "above politics," (Note: Constitution: Art. 3, § 3) which is construed to disqualify registered monks from voting as well as running for office. The Constitution further prohibits political parties or activities based on religion. (Note: Constitution: Art. 15, §§ 3, 4(b))

The Constitution guarantees every Bhutanese citizen "the right to freedom of thought, conscience and religion. No person shall be compelled to belong to another faith by means of coercion or inducement." (Note: Constitution: Art. 7, § 4) It further provides "[a]ll persons are equal before the law and are entitled to equal and effective protection of the law and shall not be discriminated against on the grounds of race, sex, language, religion, politics or other status." (Note: Constitution: Art. 7, § 15) The constitutional clause regarding "coercion or inducement" has been interpreted by a district court to prohibit not only forced conversion but also proselytism in the case of a Christian missionary pastor who used a generator and a projector.

=== Chhoedey Lhentshog ===
The Religious Organizations Act of 2007 aims to protect and preserve the spiritual heritage of Bhutan through providing for the registration and administration of religious organizations. (Note: Rel. Org. Act: Preamble; § 6) To meet those goals, the Act creates the Chhoedey Lhentshog as the regulatory authority on religious organizations. (Note: Rel. Org. Act: Chs. 3–18) This body is composed of eight persons, six of whom have decision making power: a Cabinet Minister appointed by the Prime Minister as the chairperson; the Tshugla Lopon of the Gedun Dratshang, an ex officio member; one eminent member of the National Council; one eminent Trulku, Khenpo, or Lam nominated by the Lams of the Nyingma Chhoedey; one eminent Anim nominated by Heads of Anim Chhoedey; one eminent Pandit nominated by the Pandits of Hindu Dharmic Samudai; a senior official from the Ministry of Finance appointed by the Finance Minister; and the Director of Culture, Ministry of Home and Cultural Affairs, an ex officio member secretary. (Note: Rel. Org. Act: § 7) The Chhoedey Lhentshog is tasked with managing, monitoring, and regulating all religious organizations except the Gedun Dratshang (overseen by the monastic authority); with promoting the principles and values of peace, non-violence, compassion and tolerance; and with creating conditions that will enable "the true and sustainable development of a good and compassionate society rooted in Buddhist ethos." (Note: Rel. Org. Act: §§ 4, 12–16) Religious organizations, in turn, must be transparent and accountable, and "respect indigenous knowledge and customs, individuals’ dignity, identity, culture and values." (Note: Rel. Org. Act: §§ 100, 101)

The Religious Organizations Act requires each religious organization to register with the Chhoedey Lhentshog, which in turn issues a certificate of registration if the applicant organization meets the requirements of the Act. The registrant must hold Bhutanese citizenship and disclose his assets, educational qualifications, and any criminal convictions. In the vent of a denial, the Act provides for appeal to the courts. (Note: Rel. Org. Act: §§ 19–22, 36)

When a group receives recognition through registration, a group still requires permission from local authorities to hold public meetings. Receiving foreign aid or inviting foreign speakers is subject to special permission from the Ministry of Home and Cultural Affairs. Otherwise, registered organizations enjoy exemption from taxes and a series rights and duties incident to corporate personhood. Organizations must, among other duties, report assets, contributions, expenditures, and liabilities to the Chhoedey Lhentshog, which maintains public records. (Note: Rel. Org. Act: §§ 23, 34, 35, 87–92) The Religious Organizations Act also outlines specific requirements for organizations' internal workings, providing a framework analogous to codes in other countries for nonprofit or religious corporations. For all religious organizations, the Act specifies corporate structure; bylaw requirements; meeting and quorum rules; corporate liabilities; fundraising and collection rules; merger; and dissolution and disposal of assets. (Note: Rel. Org. Act: §§ 39–86) The Act further codifies the elements of six offenses specifically in relation to religious organizations and their members: false statements; false or misleading information; breach of trust; misuse of investment; unlawful collection; and illegal fundraising. Illegal fundraising is defined as a petty misdemeanor resulting in a fine or suspension or cancellation of registration. All other crimes are delegated to the Penal Code for definition.

By March 2009, no religious organizations had actually been registered, and the Chhoedey Lhentshog had just had its first meeting. In September 2010, the Chhoedey Lhentshog published a list of fourteen categories of religious personalities, including gomchens, anims, trulkus, khenpos, latruels, pujariyas, and pandits, who were prohibited from participating in secular elections; the common element among the categories was the receipt of monetary assistance from the government. Some such persons serve as civil servants, however. By November 2010, the Chhoedey Lhentshog was committed to discussing how a Christian organization could be registered to represent its community at its next semiannual meeting. (Note: Rel. Org. Act: § 7) After this statement but ahead of any results, the government was seen by as likely to register only one Christian organization and to expect it to represent all Christians in Bhutan, calling for Christian unity. Similarly, Hindus, constituting around 22 percent of the population, were also represented by a single legal entity, the Hindu Dharma Samudaya (Hindu Religion Community) of Bhutan.

=== Other laws on religion ===
Law enforcement also reflects the policy of the government toward freedom of religion, particularly toward the protection of individuals' religious identities. The National Security Act prohibits "words either spoken or written, or by other means whatsoever, that promote or attempt to promote, on grounds of religion, race, language, caste or community, or on any other ground whatsoever, feelings of enmity or hatred between different religious, racial or language groups or castes and communities." Violating the NSA is punishable with up to 3 years' imprisonment although by 2007, it was not clear that the government has enforced this provision of the act. As of November 2010, parliament was reportedly in the process of revising the Penal Code to include conversions "by force or allurement."

The Marriage Act of 1980, as amended in 1996, addresses questions of family law subjects such as marriage, divorce, adoption, and child custody. Traditionally, Buddhists and Hindus have resolved questions of family law according to their religion; however, this is changing as the country takes steps to strengthen its legal system. The country's evolving legal system is based on customary law and Buddhist precepts.

== Status of religious freedom ==
The law provides for freedom of religion; however, the Government limited this right in practice. Mahayana Buddhism is the state religion. The Government discouraged both large and small religious gatherings of non-Buddhists, did not allow construction of non-Buddhist places of worship, and did not allow non-Buddhist missionaries to work in the country. No new buildings, including new places of worship, could be constructed without licenses. While previous law did not restrict the right to convert or proselytize, proselytism was prohibited based on a Royal Government decision. There were, however, no laws against publishing religious material.

An annual government grant finances the country's monastic body of 3,500 monks. The Government committed to providing this support as a result of the 1956 land reform program, which stripped the monastic establishment of wide tracts of fertile land for redistribution among the landless. As of 2007, 10 seats in the 150-seat National Assembly and 2 seats on the 11-member Royal Advisory Council were reserved for Buddhist monks by statute and out of respect for the country's tradition of Buddhist spiritual oversight. There are no religious stipulations on the remaining seats. Many non-Buddhists have worked for the Government. In 2007, the Special Commission for Cultural Affairs, with a Hindu priest as a member, also advised on religious matters. Major Buddhist holy days are state holidays. The King declared one major Hindu festival as a national holiday.

As of 2007, NGO representatives living outside the country and dissidents reported to U.S. State Department sources that only Drukpa Kagyu and Nyingma Buddhist religious teaching was permitted in schools, and that Buddhist prayer was compulsory in all government run schools. The Government contended that there was no religious curriculum in modern educational institutions in the country. Buddhist teaching was permitted only in monastic schools; religious teaching was forbidden in other schools. Local NGO interlocutors confirmed that although students took part in a prayer session each morning, it was nondenominational and not compulsory.

In the early 2000s, the Government required all citizens to conform to driglam namzha, namely by wearing the traditional Ngalop dress in public places; however, the government only strictly enforced this law for visits to Buddhist religious buildings, monasteries, government offices, schools, and for attendance at official functions and public ceremonies. Some citizens commented that enforcement of this law was arbitrary and sporadic.

=== Restrictions on religious freedom ===
Followers of religious groups other than Buddhism and Hinduism generally were free to worship in private homes, but NGOs alleged that they were prohibited from erecting religious buildings or congregating in public. Some Christian groups reported that religious meetings must be held discreetly, especially in rural areas, for fear of the authorities.

Government approval is required to construct religious buildings and religious structures must adhere to traditional architectural standards; reports by ethnic Nepalese citizens suggested that the legal process favored Buddhist temples over Hindu temples. The government provided financial assistance for the construction of Buddhist temples and shrines and state funding for monks and monasteries. NGOs alleged that the government rarely granted permission to build Hindu temples; however, the Devi Panchayan Temple in Thimphu was approved and funded by the government and was opened in September 2022.

Certain senior civil servants, regardless of religion, are required to take an oath of allegiance to the king, the country, and the people. (Note: Constitution: Third Schedule) The oath does not have religious content, but a Buddhist lama administers it. Dissidents alleged that applicants have been asked their religion before receiving government services.

In January 2006 authorities arrested two civil servants in the village of Nago in Paro District, accusing them of engaging in acts of proselytism under the false pretext of holding an official meeting, maligning the Spiritual Head of Bhutan, posing as officials on official business, and giving false information. In accordance with provisions in the Penal Code and the National Security Act, both men were found guilty in a district court. Christian groups maintained the men were arrested due to their religious beliefs since, according to these groups, the men were arrested while showing a Christian film in a Buddhist home. They were sentenced in early June 2006 in an open trial with a public hearing to three and a half years and three years in prison. They did not appeal the court judgment, although the right to appeal was provided for by law. On July 28, 2006, both men were released after payment of a fine.

== See also ==
- Religion in Bhutan
- Christianity in Bhutan
- Human rights in Bhutan
- Bhutanese refugees
