= Tsa Yig =

Monastic constitution based on Buddhist precepts

The Tsa Yig (Classical Tibetan: བཅའ་ཡིག་, Wylie: bca' yig) is any monastic constitution or code of moral discipline based on codified Tibetan Buddhist precepts. Every Tibetan monastery and convent had its own Tsa Yig, and the variation in Tsa Yig content shows a degree of autonomy and internal democracy.

In Bhutan, the Tsa Yig Chenmo (Dzongkha: བཅའ་ཡིག་ཆེན་མོ་; Wylie: bca' yig chen-mo; "constitution, code of law") refers to the legal code enacted by founder Shabdrung Ngawang Namgyal around 1629. Before the Shabdrung enacted the Tsa Yig as the national legal code, he had established the code as the law of Ralung and Cheri Monasteries by 1620. The code described the spiritual and civil regime and provided laws for government administration and for social and moral conduct. The duties and virtues inherent in the Buddhist religious law (dharma) played a large role in the legal code, which remained in force until the 1960s.

== Monastic constitutions ==
The Tsa Yig, as monastic constitutions or ordinances, emphasize institutional organization and the liturgical calendar. Considered a special type of Buddhist literature, these codes have a close connection with, but are separate from, the general vinaya rules on individual morality and conduct. While they shared some common elements of basic structure, individual Tsa Yig codes vary considerably in scope and content, such that no one could be called typical. These variations indicate a measure of monastic autonomy and internal democracy.

For example, one Tsa Yig included anti-hunting laws banning hunting outright for monks as well as regulating hunting among laypersons. The Tsa Yig for one gelugpa establishment provides, "when itinerant game hunters appear, they should be punished by gathering their weapons in the protector's temple and in addition exhorted once again to observe lawfulness."

The Tsa Yig is not limited to mainstream Tibetan Buddhism, but has been implemented in Bön monasteries as well. In 1902, for example, the laws of the Tsa Yig were observed written on a broad sheet of pasted daphne paper and posted in a conspicuous position in a Tibetan Bönpo monastery. The Tsa Yig stipulated that when an ordained monk was found guilty of violating rules, particularly those regarding chastity, he should be immediately punished and expelled from the monastery. Such punishments were, however, commutable into fines, such as the payment of money to the lama who ordained him, and providing entertainment and presents for the other monastic authorities and the members of the congregation.

== Tsa Yig in Bhutan ==
The Tsa Yig held a special position in Bhutan as the nation's main legal code from its founding in 1629, through the establishment of the modern Bhutanese monarchy, until de jure abrogation in 1965. During this time, the social and moral code of Shabdrung Ngawang Namgyal evolved to a code of regulations for the unified Kingdom of Bhutan. Many basic tenets of the Bhutanese Tsa Yig live on in modern legal codes, including its Constitution.

=== Early Bhutan ===
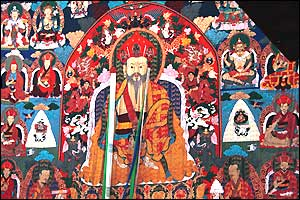
Shabdrung Ngawang Namgyal instituted the Tsa Yig and the Cho-sid-nyi (dual system) in Bhutan

The Tsa Yig of Shabdrung Ngawang Namgyal laid down the dual system of government of Bhutan, a synthesis of spiritual and temporal authority. Central to the system was a spirit of perfect disinterestedness in the trappings of power. The Tsa Yig governed the conduct of and relations between the debs (kings), the priesthood, and the raiyats (peasants). The spiritual laws were said to resemble a silken knot known as "Chho-Thrim Dargi Dudphu," easy and light at first but gradually becoming tighter and tighter; the temporal and monarchical laws were said to resemble a golden yoke known as "Gyal-Thrim Sergi Nyashing," growing heavier and heavier by degrees. Both symbols appear on the crest of the modern Royal Court of Justice.

The Tsa Yig contained the prohibitions of the "ten impious acts." The prohibitions included homicide, a crime punished by the payment of blood-money. Robbery and theft of church or monastic property was compensable by damages or repayment. The Tsa Yig stipulated eightyfold repayment in cases of stealing the king's property, and eightfold repayment in cases of theft among subjects. Adultery was also punishable by fines. Falsehood was punishable by the offender being put to death in a temple, and the invocation of tutelar deities and gods.

The Tsa Yig also contained affirmative duties called the "sixteen acts of social piety." All were required to regard parents with filial respect and affections, and elders with reverence. All were to receive with gratitude any kind action done by others to themselves. Furthermore, they were to avoid dishonesty and the use of false measures. These were the essence of the "sixteen acts of social piety" of the Tsa Yig.

=== Modern Bhutan ===
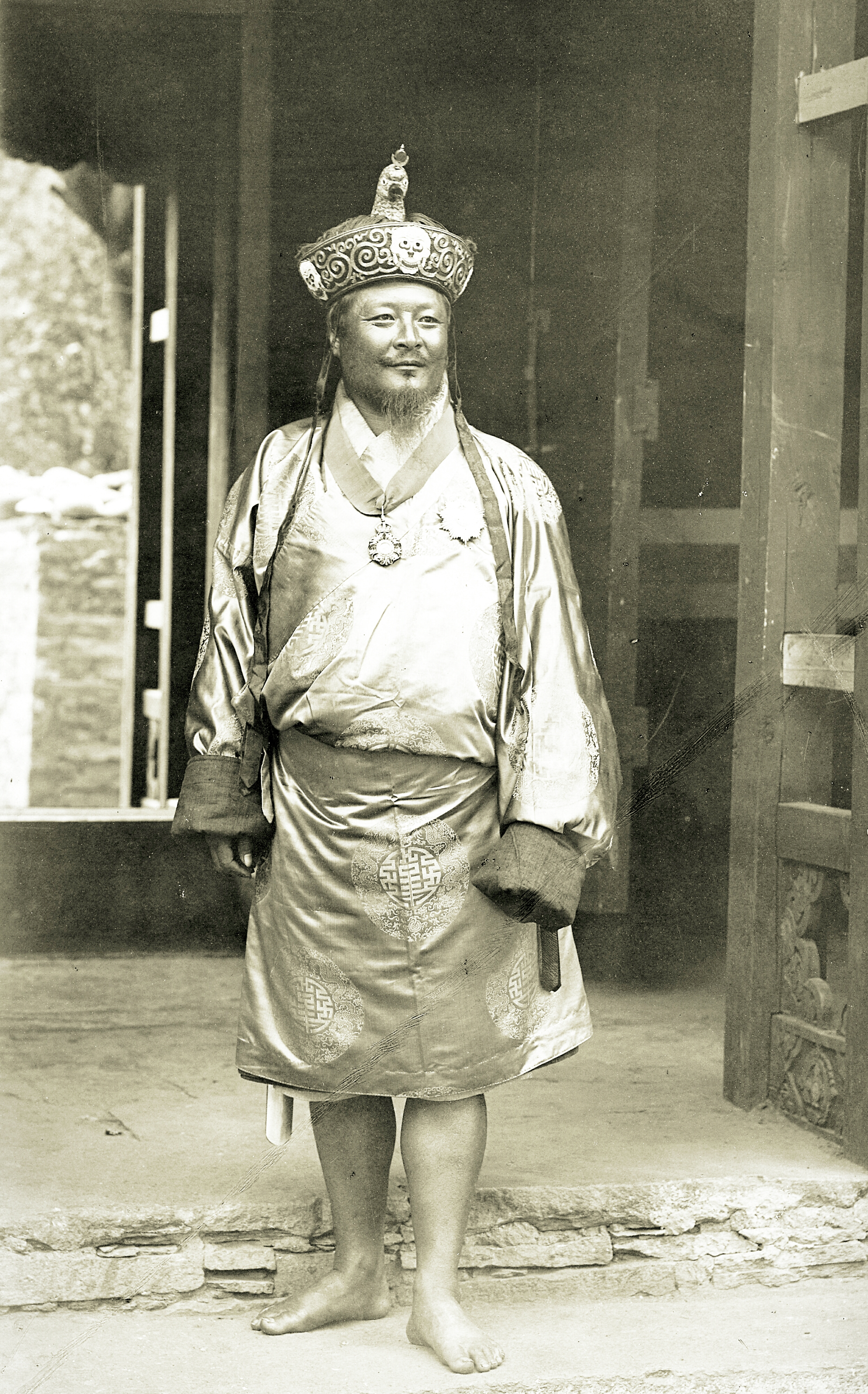
Penlop (governor) Ugyen Wangchuck consolidated power as Druk Gyalpo (hereditary monarch) and Druk Desi in Bhutan, and extensively revised the Tsa Yig

In 1907, Ugyen Wangchuck, penlop (governor) of Trongsa, had consolidated power as hereditary monarch of Bhutan and as hereditary holder of the office of the Druk Desi under the dual system of government. Soon after ascension to the throne and office, the king found it necessary to make several modifications to the existing Tsa Yig, citing "dangerous laxity" as having "crept into all branches of justice." Lamas were observed violating their oaths and other priestly habits. Meanwhile, government corruption and inadequacy in law enforcement led to a loss of faith among the populace in its governors.

The king therefore instated new rules in the Tsa Yig, which he justified in terms of Buddhist precepts. Foremost, the king made laws on the collection of taxes and accountability of collectors to the king, prohibited the combining of raiyat (peasant) holdings, retroactively annulled such prior combinations, and provided for the escheat of the property of lamas upon death or retirement in order to curtail their number and power. Regulations on conduct within dzongs was also refined. Taxation in the form of labor remained an important institution.

King Ugyen Wangchuck's reforms prohibited the sale and purchase of slaves, and limited the use of coolies by state officers to occasions where the health of the officer required such. Otherwise, the institution of slavery was left intact: slaves attempting to escape were to be detained, and anyone who harbored an escaped slave was to "make good the slave." However, if one returned an escaped slave, the owner faced a legal obligation to compensate him for his time and effort.

Those who harbored thieves were to receive the same punishment as the criminals themselves. Anyone who wrongly threatened or attempted to strike another with a sword was made liable for a sword fine. One who committed homicide but did not flee the scene was to be punished by being "bound to the corpse of the deceased whom he has killed," whereas one who fled could be killed wherever and whenever he was caught. The children of a homicide were to be banished from their home, a kind of status crime. Exceptions to the prohibition of homicide were refined to include self-defense, exculpating victims of thieves and robbers who overpowered and killed their attackers. Those who killed notorious thieves or enemies during war were to be rewarded. Government insubordination and corruption, as well as the forging of government letters, was to be punished by blinding or by decapitation.

Funerary and other religious rules pepper King Ugyen Wangchuck's reforms. Also included is a ban on the "most filthy and noxious herb, called tobacco."

=== Codification and abrogation ===
The grandson of Ugyen, King Jigme Dorji Wangchuck further reformed the Tsa Yig as part of his broader modernization program. He began to open Bhutan to the outside world and took the first steps toward democratization. Upon accession to the throne in 1952, Jigme Dorji Wangchuck put an end to feudalism and slavery and released all remaining serfs.

The Tsa Yig was revised in 1957 and ostensibly replaced with a new code in 1965. The 1965 code, however, retained most of the spirit and substance of the 17th century code. Family problems, such as marriage, divorce, and adoption, usually were resolved through recourse to Buddhist or Hindu religious law. In modern Bhutan, village heads often judged minor cases and Dungkhag (district) officials adjudicated major crimes. While Bhutan's criminal codes continue to be built upon the principles of the Tsa Yig, Bhutan's Constitution of 2008 effectively abrogates the direct political authority of the lamas, capital punishment, and banishment. The modern Constitution does, however, retain sets of duties and prohibitions in a dichotomy similar to the original Tsa Yig.

== See also ==
- Constitution of Bhutan
- Dual system of government
- History of Bhutan
- Judicial system of Bhutan
- Law of Bhutan
- Royal Court of Justice
- Slavery in Bhutan
