= Capital punishment in Bhutan =

Capital punishment in Bhutan was abolished on March 20, 2004 and is prohibited under the 2008 Constitution. The prohibition appears among a number of fundamental rights guaranteed by the Constitution; while some fundamental rights—such as voting, land ownership, and equal pay—extend only to Bhutanese citizens, the prohibition on capital punishment applies to all people within the kingdom.

== History ==
Under the reforms to the Tsa Yig by the first King of Bhutan, Ugyen Wangchuck, capital punishment was the penalty for murderers who fled the scene and for those who forged government documents. Under the National Security Act of 1992, the death penalty was designated for those guilty of "treasonable acts" or of overt acts "with intent to give aid and comfort to the enemy in order to deliberately and voluntarily betray" the royal government.

On April 5, 1964, Prime Minister Jigme Palden Dorji was assassinated in a dispute among competing political factions. The King's own uncle and head of the Royal Bhutan Army, Namgyal Bahadur, was among those executed for their role in the attempted coup.

== See also ==
- Law enforcement in Bhutan
- Human rights in Bhutan
- Religion and capital punishment
- Judicial system of Bhutan
- Constitution of Bhutan
