= Royal Court of Justice =

Supreme court of Bhutan

The Bhutanese Royal Court of Justice (Dzongkha: དཔལ་ལྡན་འབྲུག་པའི་དྲང་ཁྲིམས་ལྷན་སྡེ་; Wylie Dpal-ldan 'Brug-pai Drang-khrims Lhan-sde; Palden Drukpa Drangkhrim Lhende) is the government body which oversees the judicial system of Bhutan. Senior Judges of the courts are appointed by the monarch. Bhutan's legal system is influenced by English common law. The Royal Court of Justice is based in the capital Thimphu.

== Background ==
The Bhutanese justice system has always suffered from a lack of qualified officers with most of the office-holders being civil servants. Until the passing of the National Judicial Service Act of 2007, Judges were still a part of the Bhutanese civil service.

== Codification in 2008 constitution ==
In 2008, the Constitution of Bhutan codified the substantive and procedural framework of the Royal Court of Justice. Article 21 of the Constitution establishes a system of royal appointments for the High Court and Supreme Court, and sets forth the role of each level of administration.

The Chief Justice, an appointee of the King, sits for a five-year term and chairs the National Judicial Commission, a royal agency. (Art. 21, §§ 4, 6, 17) The Chief Justice is to participate in several extrajudicial functions, including the Regency Council; presiding over joint sessions of the Parliament of Bhutan for abdication procedures; and presiding over political impeachment proceedings. (Art. 2, §§ 8, 23; Art. 32, § 3)

All Constitutionally appointed judges other than the Chief Justice serve ten-year terms. (Art. 21, §§ 6, 13) There is, however, a mandatory retirement at age 65 for all Judges of the Supreme Court. (Art. 21, § 6) The Chief Justice and the Drangpons of the High Court serve ten-year terms, or until mandatory retirement at age 60. (Art. 21, § 13) No Constitutionally appointed judge may be re-appointed. (Art. 31, § 4)

== Structure ==
- The Supreme Court of Bhutan - highest appellate court in Bhutan, authority on interpretation of laws
- The High Court of Bhutan - appellate and extraterritorial jurisdiction
- Administrative Tribunals established by Parliament
- The Dzongkhag Court - District courts (20)
- The Dungkhag Court - Sub-District courts (13 total in 6 Districts)

== See also ==
- Supreme Court of Bhutan
- High Court of Bhutan
- Dzongkhag Court
- Dungkhag Court
- Districts of Bhutan
- Constitution of Bhutan
- Politics of Bhutan
- Judicial system of Bhutan
- Judiciary
