= Dungkhag Court =

Court in Bhutan

The Dungkhag Court (sub-district court) is the court of first instance of the Royal Court of Justice in 6 of the 20 Dzongkhags of Bhutan which have Dungkhag administrative divisions; in the remaining 14 Dzongkhags, the Dzongkhag Court is the court of first instance. There are a total of 13 Dungkhags (sub-districts) in the 6 Dzongkhags (districts) that contain them. Like the members of the Dzongkhag Court, the judges of the Dungkhag Court are not appointed by the Druk Gyalpo under the 2008 Constitution.

== See also ==
- Supreme Court of Bhutan
- High Court of Bhutan
- Dzongkhag Court
- Constitution of Bhutan
- Politics of Bhutan
- Judicial system of Bhutan
- Judiciary
