= Attorney General of Bhutan =

Chief Advocate of Bhutan

- Incumbent; Shera Lhendup since May 22, 2015
- Abbreviation: AG
- Residence: Thimphu, Bhutan
- Seat: Thori Lam
- Appointer: King of Bhutan
- Term length: No fixed tenure
- Constituting instrument: Article 29 of the Constitution
- Formation: 15 August 2006
- First holder: Dasho Tashi Phuntsog

The Office of the Attorney General of Bhutan (Dzongkha: རྩོད་དཔོན་ཡོངས་ཁྱབ་ཡིག་ཚང་; Wylie: rtsong-dpon yongs-khyab yig-tshang) is the legal arm of the executive branch of the government. It is also the legal adviser of the government and its representative in the judicial system of Bhutan. Under the Constitution of 2008, the Attorney General is appointed by the King of Bhutan on the advice of the Prime Minister. The Office of the Attorney General is codified by the Attorney General Act of 2006, an act of parliament incorporated by the Constitution. Under the Act, the Attorney General also authors and reviews legislation for parliament.

== Office of the Attorney General ==
The Office of the Attorney General was first formed as the "Office of Legal Affairs" in 1999 by the Lhengye Zhungtshog (Council of Ministers) on the recommendation of its Special Task Force on Enhancing Good Governance. The Office of Legal Affairs was formally established by law on April 14, 2000, as the government's central legal agency. In 2000, the Office began to assume the role of prosecutor, until then the purview of the Royal Civil Service Commission Secretariat and the Law and Order Division of the Ministry of Home Affairs. The policies and decisions of the Office were guided during its early years by Terms of Reference issued by the Council of Ministers in 2002.

On June 30, 2006, the Office of Legal Affairs was replaced by the Office of the Attorney General that exists today. The Attorney General Act of 2006 creates an independent Attorney General office responsible for advising the government, representing it in legal matters including law enforcement, and drafting and reviewing legislation.

The Attorney General Act of 2006, wholly incorporated by the Constitution of 2008, tasks the Attorney General with prosecuting crimes, safeguarding the impartiality of the judicial process, and disseminating information about the law among the people. The Attorney General also drafts Bhutanese legislation for submission to parliament, reviews legislation authored in parliament, and advises all levels of government regarding judicial decisions.

The Office of the Attorney General currently codifies its own Prosecution Guidelines for its Prosecution and Litigation Division. When deciding whether to prosecute cases under Bhutanese law, the Prosecution and Litigation Division first evaluates whether there exists a prima facie case – whether the elements of the offense are met. When a prima facie case is established, the matter is subjected to an "Evidential Test" and a "Public Interest Test." The "Evidential Test" requires sufficient to convict the accused, and that "any reasonable judge would, without compunctions, hold the accused guilty." The "Public Interest Test" requires further that such a prosecution would not have an adverse implication on the public.

=== Divisions of the Office of the Attorney General ===
The Office of the Attorney General is divided into divisions and sections; these divisions are overseen by the Deputy Attorney General, who reports to the Attorney General:

- Administration & Finance Division
- Drafting & Review Division:
  - Drafting Section; Review Section
- Legal Services Division:
  - Domestic Section; International Section
- Policy & Planning Division
- Prosecution & Litigation Division:
  - Civil Section; Criminal Section
- Research & IT Division:
  - Research Section; IT Section; Library & Documentation Section

== List of attorneys general ==
Prior to June 30, 2006, Attorneys General of Bhutan were known as "Directors of the Office of Legal Affairs."

Lungten Dubgyur resigned Sept. 8, 2023; Dasho Sonam Tashi was appointed March 3, 2024.

Order	Name	Term
1	Dasho Tashi Phuntsog	January 1, 2000 – September 7, 2001
2	Kuenlay Tshering	September 7, 2001 – March 6, 2006
	Pema Rinzin, Officiating Director	March 6, 2006 – April 26, 2006
3	Damcho Dorji	April 26, 2006 – June 30, 2006
4	Damcho Dorji	September 25, 2006 – August 22, 2007
	Karma Lhuntshi, Officiating Attorney General	August 22, 2007 – July 2008
5	Rinzin Penjor	July 2008 – May 14, 2010
6	Phuntsho Wangdi	May 14, 2010 – May 22, 2015
7	Shera Lhendup	May 22, 2015- May 22, 2020
8	Lungten Dubgyur	July 2020 – (incumbent)

== See also ==
- Law of Bhutan
- Judicial system of Bhutan
- Constitution of Bhutan
