= Judicial system of Bhutan =

The judicial system of Bhutan is the purview of the Royal Court of Justice, the judicial branch of the government of Bhutan under the Constitution of 2008. The judicial system comprises the Judicial Commission, the courts, the police, the penal code, and regulations on jabmi (attorneys).

== Judicial system ==
=== National Judicial Commission ===
The National Judicial Commission was established in 2001 as part of Bhutan's Civil and Criminal Procedure Code. It began as a body appointed by the Druk Gyalpo and chaired by the Chief Justice of Bhutan, also a royal appointee. In 2001, the number of council members was not codified.

The Commission was reshaped with the enactment of the Judicial Service Act of 2007. Its membership was codified to include the chairperson of the Legislative Committee of the National Assembly, the Attorney General, the senior most Associate Justice (Drangpon) of the Supreme Court, and the Chief Justice of Bhutan as Chairperson. The Commission advises the Druk Gyalpo on judicial appointments (the Chief Justice of Bhutan and the Drangpons of the Supreme Court and High Court – also the members of the Commission itself). The Commission also advises the Druk Gyalpo on the establishment of courts and tribunals in addition to those established by law. With the enactment of the Constitution of Bhutan in 2008, the Commission membership was reduced to four persons: the Chief Justice of Bhutan as Chairperson, the senior most Drangpon of the Supreme Court, the Chairperson of the Legislative Committee of the National Assembly, and the Attorney General (Art. 2) All members of the Committee except the National Assembly Committee Chairperson remain royal appointments.

The Judicial Service Act of 2007 also established the Royal Judicial Service Council, an administrative agency ancillary to the National Judicial Commission. It has seven members: the Chief Justice of the High Court; the Registrars General of the Supreme Court and High Court; one sitting Drangpon of the Supreme Court; two Drangpons of the Dzongkhag Courts; and one Drangpon of the Dungkhag Courts on a two-year rotational basis. No Supreme Court Drangpon may simultaneously sit on both the Commission and the Council. The Royal Judicial Service Council determines and administers the organizational structure, budgetary, and personnel requirements of the judiciary. The Council is also empowered to create and abolish posts other than those of the Supreme Court and the High Court Drangpons, regulate higher or continuing legal education, and oversee the Judicial Service Selection Examination. All decisions of the Council must be reviewed by the Chief Justice of Bhutan.

The Judicial Service Act codified the requirement that those in judicial service attain at least a bachelor of laws, including support personnel (clerks). Drangpons of the Dzongkhag and Dungkhag Courts are required to attain a postgraduate diploma in National Law. Prior to the Act, judges were selected from among civil servants. Other qualifications, such as natural born citizenship, lack of foreign relations, and political detachment are imposed under the Act. The Act also established rules of judicial conduct and promotion criteria.

The Judicial Service Act of 2007 also codified aspects of the Bhutanese judicial system that appear in the Constitution of 2008, namely the function of the National Judicial Commission, the roles and appointments of the upper judiciary, and the general framework of the court system. Insofar as the Judicial Service Act is not inconsistent with the Constitution, it remains in effect.

=== Court system ===
The ultimate authority of the judiciary and on the interpretation of laws is the Royal Court of Justice. Its constitutional mandate is to safeguard, uphold, and administer justice fairly and independently without fear, favour, or undue delay in accordance with the rule of law to inspire trust and confidence and to enhance access to justice. (Art. 21) The Royal Court of Justice is composed of the Supreme Court, the High Court, the Dzongkhag Courts, the Dungkhag Courts, and such other courts and tribunals as may be established by the King on the recommendation of the National Judicial Commission.

Under the Constitution, as under the earlier Judicial Service Act, the Druk Gyalpo appoints most of the upper Judicial branch: the Chief Justice of Bhutan and the Drangpons (Associate Justices) of the Supreme Court; the Chief Justice and Drangpons (Associate Justices) of the High Court. These royal judicial appointments are made from among the vacant positions' peers, juniors, and available eminent jurists in consultation with the National Judicial Commission.

==== Attorney General ====
Within the court system, the government of Bhutan and its organs are advised and represented in civil and criminal proceedings by the Attorney General of Bhutan. The Attorney General is appointed by the King of Bhutan on the advice of the Prime Minister. The Attorney General Act of 2006, wholly incorporated by the Constitution of 2008, tasks the Attorney General with prosecuting crimes, safeguarding the impartiality of the judicial process, and disseminating information about the law among the people. The Attorney General also drafts Bhutanese legislation for submission to parliament, reviews legislation authored in parliament, and advises all levels of government regarding judicial decisions.

==== Civil and criminal procedure ====
In the Bhutanese judicial system, civil and criminal procedure are defined by the Civil and Criminal Procedure Code of 2001. Foremost, the Code provides for open trials, equal protection of the laws, impartiality, and habeas corpus petition rights. Both civil and criminal trials in Bhutan are decided by one or more judges. After final appeal in the court system, the Code provides for appeal to the Druk Gyalpo.

General procedure regulations include summons (including service), discovery (including privileges such as attorney work product), attachment of property, injunctions, interlocutory orders, receivership, and other legal mechanisms of common law civil actions. Its guarantees include general evidentiary standards, such as adversarial introduction of physical and testimonial evidence, cross examination, and production of exhibits. Unlike common law systems, however, Bhutanese judges are also authorized to investigate, inspect, or inquire into any matter before it. But as in common law systems, civil actions require parties prove their cases on a preponderance of the evidence. Also like common law jurisdictions, the prosecution's burden of proof (in order to find the accused guilty) is to prove guilt beyond reasonable doubt to the full satisfaction of the Court.

The Code's civil procedure section further provides venue, jurisdiction, and pleadings rules. Many aspects are identical to common law procedure, namely the United States Federal Rules of Civil Procedure, including terminology for claims, pleadings, and motions. In civil actions, the parties are at all times able to resolve their disputes before local government mediators.

The Code's criminal procedure section provides laws on arrest by police (with and without warrant), citizen's arrest, several kinds of search and seizure (also with and without warrant), charge, and trial procedure. Pleas, bargaining, and sentencing are also regulated under the Code, along with special rules for juvenile offenders. Nearly all the Code's criminal procedure is identical to that of any modern common law jurisdiction.

The Civil and Criminal Procedure Code of 2001 also sets forth the structure and jurisdiction of the Bhutanese court system, echoed in the Judicial Service Act of 2007 and preserved by the Constitution of Bhutan in 2008.

==== Evidentiary standards ====
Evidentiary standards are codified by the Evidence Act of 2005. The Act includes many modern, liberal English common law provisions including the exclusion of evidence that is unfairly prejudicial, exclusion of evidence of attempts to settle outside court, and exclusion of evidence of subsequent remedial measures. The Act, however, does not guarantee parties before a court to confront the witnesses against them when the court believes the witness' identity needs to be protected. Physical evidence on an issue renders documentary evidence on the same issue inadmissible unless the court finds there is substantive and reasonable ground for the physical evidence to be untrue and irrelevant. Thus, judges retain a high level of discretion in the admission of evidence in all cases and the ability to rebut witness evidence in certain others. Witnesses may be impeached by prior inconsistent statements or by evidence of prior bad acts involving dishonesty or fraud. There are also provisions protecting witnesses and victims of sexual crimes which render evidence about the witness or victim's sexual behavior inadmissible in most situations. Hearsay (including non-hearsay and hearsay exceptions), party admissions, burdens, and presumptions are also codified in a fashion similar to the United States Federal Rules of Evidence.

The Evidence Act also covers the requirements of contracts, legally termed "written agreements". Valid agreements require writing in the presence of one witness of each party; signature by all parties or another person himself duly empowered by a written agreement; and legal execution with a stamp. Contracts are invalidated by an erased word; an alteration which is not counter-signed by the parties executing the agreement; a defective seal or signature; an improper legal stamp; the mental unsoundness, duress, or minority of a party; an objection by any party in a court within 10 days; or is illegal in nature or object. Parol evidence is admissible only in order to resolve ambiguities, apparently both patent and latent.

==== Practice of law ====
The Jabmi Act sets forth regulations for the legal profession. Namely, the Act also details the role and responsibilities of the Attorney General of Bhutan. The body which regulates the legal profession is defined as the Jabmi Tshogdey, analogous to a bar association. All jabmi must be members of this body in good standing, and the Act sets forth several requirements for membership. All jabmi must be Bhutanese citizens; persons of integrity, good character and reputation; not addicted to drugs; not of unsound mind or of mental infirmity; not adjudged bankrupt; not sentenced for criminal offences; have legal qualification recognized by the Jabmi Tshogdey; have undergone the National Legal Course; and have passed the Bar selection examinations. The Constitution guarantees all persons the right to "consult and be represented by a Bhutanese Jabmi of [their] choice." (Art. 7, § 21)

Notably, instances of repeated violations of the Jabmi Act by one jabmi resulted in a one-year prison sentence as well as multiple fines and monetary judgments against him.

=== Penal system ===
Under the Royal Command of Druk Gyalpo Jigme Singye Wangchuck in 1995, the High Court started drafting the Penal Code, which was enacted by the National Assembly in the August 2004. The Penal Code is the consolidation of collection of separate acts and sections of the Thrimzung Chhenmo enacted between 1959 and 1990. It is intended to reinstate dignity to the victims of crime and increase the possibilities for rehabilitation of offenders. It remains intact insofar as it is consistent with the Constitution of 2008. While modern punishments include imprisonment and fines, capital punishment in Bhutan has been outlawed since March 20, 2004.

=== Police force ===
Under Article 28 § 3 of Constitution of Bhutan, the Royal Bhutan Police, as a trained uniform force under the Ministry of Home Affairs, are primarily responsible for maintaining law and order and prevention of crime, and are also considered to be an important part of the nation's security force. Furthermore, the Royal Bhutan Police are empowered with some quasi-judicial powers, namely to prosecute suspects and to summon witnesses.

== History of the judicial system ==
Bhutan's civil and criminal codes are based on the Tsa Yig, a code established by Shabdrung Ngawang Namgyal in the seventeenth century. The Tsa Yig was revised in 1957 and ostensibly replaced with a new code in 1965. Historically, in Bhutan's judicial system, the King of Bhutan played an active role in the selection and retention of judges, as well as adjudication. Judicial appointments were made by the monarch, and until 2008, could be recalled by him at any time. Furthermore, the monarch was the final court of appeal (the "Supreme Court of Appeal").

During the reign of the Third King, Druk Gyalpo Jigme Dorji Wangchuck, the National Assembly enacted the first comprehensive codified laws known as the Thrimzhung Chhenmo ("Supreme Law") in 1953, which contain almost all modern categories of criminal offenses and their penalties. The 1965 code, however, retained most of the spirit and substance of the seventeenth-century code. Family problems, such as marriage, divorce, and adoption, usually were resolved through recourse to Buddhist or Hindu religious law. As late as 1991, village heads often judged minor cases and district officials adjudicated major crimes.

Trials in the 1980s were public, and it was the practice of the accuser and the accused each to put their cases in person to judges. There were no lawyers in Bhutan's legal system until the 1980s, and decisions were made on the facts of each case as presented by the litigants. Judges appointed by the Druk Gyalpo were responsible for investigations, filing of charges, prosecution, and judgment of defendants. Serious crimes were extremely rare throughout the twentieth century, although there were reports of increased criminal activity in the 1980s and early 1990s with the influx of foreign laborers, widening economic disparities, and greater contact with foreign cultures.

Arrests could be made only under legal authority. Exile, stated as a punishment in the 1953 Constitution of the National Assembly, and its 1968 revision, was generally unused as a form of punishment; mutilation was abolished in 1965. Fines, according to various reports, ranged from the equivalent of US$10 to US$55, and jail sentences from seven days to one month were levied against citizens who violated the driglam namzha a compulsory but not widely enforced 1989 royal decree that they wear the national dress at formal gatherings to preserve and promote Bhutanese culture. With respect to international criminal law, in 1988 the National Assembly ratified a SAARC convention on terrorism, which Bhutan has consistently condemned in international forums. It provided for extradition of terrorists.

Until the enactment of the Constitution of Bhutan in 2008, the Royal High Court of Bhutan was the highest court in the kingdom . The Royal High Court had original jurisdiction over the twenty dzongkhags of the nation.

== See also ==
- Royal Court of Justice
- Constitution of Bhutan
- Capital punishment in Bhutan
- Bhutanese legislation
- Royal Bhutan Police
- Law enforcement in Bhutan
