= High Court of Bhutan =

Highest court in Bhutan

- Established: 3 November 1967
- Jurisdiction: Bhutan
- Location: Thimphu
- Composition method: Appointment by the Druk Gyalpo from a list of drangpons of dzongkhag courts or from eminent jurists on the recommendation of the National Judicial Commission
- Authorised by: Constitution of Bhutan
- Website: www.highcourt.gov.bt

Chief Justice of High Court
- Currently: Duba Drukpa

The High Court of Bhutan derives its authority from the 2008 Constitution of Bhutan. It consists of the Chief Justice and eight Drangpons (Associate Justices). The Chief Justice and Drangpons of the High Court are appointed from among juniors, peers, and eminent jurists by the Druk Gyalpo. The judges of the High Court serve 10 year terms, or until reaching age 60; this retirement age is unique among the Civil Service and Constitutional Offices of Bhutan — all others retire at age 65. During their tenure, they are subject to censure and suspension by the Druk Gyalpo on the recommendation of the National Judicial Commission for proven misbehavior that does not rise to the level of impeachment.

== List of High Court Judges ==
- Acting Chief Justice of the High Court of Bhutan - Dasho Sangay Khandu(Justice, Supreme court of Bhutan)
- Justice, Dasho Lungten Drubgyur (retd)
- Justice, Dasho Tshering Namgyal (retd)
- Justice, Dasho Duba Dukpa (Chief Justice of the High Court)
- Justice, Dasho Kinley Dorji
- Justice, Dasho Pema Wangchuk
- Justice, Dasho Pema Rinzin
- Justice, Dasho Dr. Jangchub Norbu
- Justice, Dasho Pasang Wangmo
- Justice, Dasho Birkha Bdr. Tamang
- Justice, Dasho Tshering Dorji
- Justice, Dasho Lobzang Rinzin

== See also ==
- Supreme Court of Bhutan
- Dzongkhag Court
- Dungkhag Court
- Constitution of Bhutan
- Politics of Bhutan
- Judicial system of Bhutan
- Judiciary
