= Dzongkhag Court =

Court in Bhutan

The Dzongkhag Court exists in each of Bhutan's 20 Dzongkhags, and is the court of first instance of the Royal Court of Justice in 14 of the 20 Dzongkhags of Bhutan. In the remaining 6 Dzongkhags there exists a further subdivision, Dungkhag, which is the basic level of judicial administration in those jurisdictions. The Chief Justice and Drangpons (Associate Justices) of the Dzongkhag Courts. Unlike the judges of the Supreme Court and High Court, they are not appointed by the Druk Gyalpo under the 2008 Constitution.

== See also ==
- Supreme Court of Bhutan
- High Court of Bhutan
- Dungkhag Court
- Constitution of Bhutan
- Politics of Bhutan
- Judicial system of Bhutan
- Judiciary
