= Supreme Court of Bhutan =

Highest law court of the Kingdom of Bhutan

The Supreme Court of Bhutan (མངོན་མཐོའི་ཁྲིམས་འདུན།) is the Kingdom of Bhutan's highest court of review and interpreter of the Constitution.

The main vision of Supreme Court of Bhutan is to create a free, fair, just, and harmonious society through effective resolution of disputes and expeditious dispensation of justice.

The Supreme Court consists of one Chief Justice and four Drangpons (Associate Justices). Its appellate jurisdiction is accompanied by a limited original jurisdiction on questions of such a nature and public importance that "it is expedient to obtain the opinion of the Supreme Court". The Druk Gyalpo, or King of Bhutan, may refer the question to the Supreme Court for its consideration; the Supreme Court must then hear the case and submit an opinion to the King. The Chief Justice of the Supreme Court (also called the "Chief Justice of Bhutan"), as well as its Drangpons are appointed by the Druk Gyalpo from among their juniors and peers, or from among other eminent jurists. The Chief Justice sits for a 5 year term or until reaching age 65; other Drangpons sit for 10 year terms or until reaching age 65. All Justices of the Supreme Court of Bhutan are limited to two terms. During their tenure, they are subject to by censure and suspension by command of the Druk Gyalpo on the recommendation of the National Judicial Commission for proven misbehaviour that does not rise to the level of impeachment.

The National Judicial Commission (4 persons) is chaired by the Chief Justice of Bhutan. The senior-most Drangpon of the Supreme Court also holds one position on the Commission.

== Lists of Chief Justices ==
#	Name	Began	Ended	Tenure
1	Lyonpo Sonam Tobgye (born November 14, 1949)	21 February 2010	14 November 2014	5 years, 10 months
2	Dasho Tshering Wangchuk	28 November 2014	2019	
3	Lyonpo Chogyal Dago Rigdzin	12 June 2020	11 June 2025	
4	Lyonpo Norbu Tshering	23 July 2025	Present	

== See also ==
- High Court of Bhutan
- Dzongkhag Court
- Dungkhag Court
- Constitution of Bhutan
- Politics of Bhutan
- Judicial system of Bhutan
- Judiciary
