= Royal Civil Service Commission =

Civil service commission of Bhutan

Royal Civil Service Commission of Bhutan
- Abbreviation: RCSC
- Type: Governmental organization
- Legal status: Constitutional Body
- Purpose: Recruitment
- Headquarters: Thimphu, Bhutan
- Chairperson: Tashi Pem
- Website: https://www.rcsc.gov.bt/en/

Royal Civil Service Commission of Bhutan (Dzongkha: རྒྱལ་གཞུང་ཞི་གཡོག་ལྷན་ཚོགས།, romanized: rgyal gzhung zhi gyog lhan tshogs) is a constitutional body “to promote an independent and apolitical civil service that will discharge its public duties in an efficient, transparent and accountable manner.” The Royal Civil Service Commission (RCSC) was established in 1982 by His Majesty the Fourth Druk Gyalpo through a Royal Charter. Following the adoption of the Constitution of the Kingdom of Bhutan in 2008, the RCSC was enshrined as a Constitutional body.

== History ==
The first step to the formation of RCSC was the establishment of the Department of Manpower under the Ministry of Development in 1973. With the rapid socio-economic development, the Civil Service administration became more complex, and the Royal Government of Bhutan recognized the need to further strengthen department with a clear mandate.

On 2nd June, 1982, His Majesty the King Jigme Singye Wangchuck issued a Royal Charter for the formation of a Civil Service Commission. Accordingly, the Royal Civil Service Commission was established, as the Central Personnel Agency of the Government.

== Transformations ==
The RCSC introduced Cadre System which classified Civil Service occupations into eight cadres with a hierarchy of 17 grades by 1989. The entry grade and also the highest grade to which the civil servants of each cadre could go were defined. The entry qualification required by each cadre for entering at different entry grades were detailed. The commission then released the 1st edition of Bhutan Civil Service Rules and Regulations, BCSR 1990, in November 1990. The objective was to translate the provisions of the Royal Charter for having an efficient human resource management and development system that was just, equitable and fair.

In January, 2006, the Cadre System was replaced by Position Classification System (PCS). The PCS classified Civil Service into 19 Major Occupational groups and 94 Sub-groups. The primary focus was to have a merit based, independent and apolitical Civil Service to serve the people with a high standard of efficiency, transparency, professionalism and accountability.

On 18th July 2008, the Constitution of the Kingdom of Bhutan was adopted. The Constitution enshrines the Royal Civil Service Commission as a Constitutional body, apolitical and independent responsible to discharge public duties in an effective, transparent and accountable manner.

== Vision ==
“Excellence in Service”: A Professional, Accountable and Productive Civil Service delivering efficient and effective Services underpinned by Technology, Innovation and Empathy.

== Mission ==
1. Ensure an independent and apolitical civil service that will discharge its public duties and services in an efficient, transparent and accountable manner.
2. Ensure that civil servants render professional service guided by the highest standards of ethics and integrity.
3. Ensure that uniform rules and regulations on recruitment, appointment, staffing, training, transfers, and promotion prevail throughout the civil service.
4. Continue to maintain a small, compact, and an efficient Civil Service that is merit-based.
5. Enhance Civil Service capacity through Human Resource Development Programs.
6. Maintain up-to-date personnel information on all civil servants.
7. Pursue the goals of the Institute of Civil Service Record.

== Commission Members ==
- Tashi Pem: Chairperson
- Lobzang Dorji: Commissioner
- Kinlay Tshering: Commissioner
- Baburam Sherpa: Commissioner
- Tshering Cigay Dorji: Commissioner

== Code of Conduct of a Civil Servant ==
Civil Service Act of Bhutan 2010, Section 38 & 39

- A Civil Servant shall not be eligible to be a candidate for any election conducted under the electoral laws of the Kingdom or hold any paid or unpaid post in any political party.
- A Civil Servant shall not canvass for the political party or any candidate in an election conducted under the electoral laws of the Kingdom.
- A Civil Servant shall not engage in any corrupt activities.
- A Civil Servant shall not be a member of, belong to or take part in a society, assembly or association, except as may be permitted under the rules and regulations.
- A Civil Servant shall not instigate, involve or participate in a strike, demonstration, marches or other similar activities.
- A Civil Servant shall not engage in proselytization.
- A Civil Servant shall not engage in sexual harassment.
- A Civil Servant shall not act against the interest of Tsa-Wa-Sum.
