= Religion in Bhutan =

Religion in Bhutan, 2010
1. Buddhism (74.8%)
2. Hinduism (22.6%)
3. Bon (folk religion) & others (1.90%)
4. Christianity (0.50%)
5. Islam (0.40%)

Bhutan is a Buddhist country by constitution and Buddhism plays a vital role in the country.

The official religion in Bhutan is Buddhism, which is practiced by 74.7% of the population. Hinduism is followed by 22.6% of the Population.

The freedom of religion is guaranteed by the King.

In the past, approximately 75% of the population of 770,000 followed either the Drukpa Lineage of the Kagyu school, the Nyingma school of Tibetan Buddhism or another school of Buddhism. Almost 22% of citizens (mainly Lhotshampas) practiced Hinduism.

== Buddhism ==
The constitution states that Buddhism is the state's “spiritual heritage”; It also states that the king must be Buddhist, but must also be the “protector of all religions.”

The Sharchops, descendants of the country's probable original inhabitants, make up most of the eastern population. It is reported that some Sharchops practice Buddhism combined with elements of Bon whereas others practice animism and Hinduism.

In the early 2000s, the Ngalop people, descendants of Tibetan immigrants, comprised the majority of the population in the western and central areas and mostly followed the Drukpa Lineage of Kagyu Vajrayana. The government supported both Kagyu and Nyingma Buddhist monasteries. The royal family practiced a combination of Nyingma and Kagyu Buddhism and many citizens believe in the concept of "Kanyin-Zungdrel," meaning "Kagyupa and Ningmapa as one."

== Hinduism ==
Hindus, mainly in the South, practice Hinduism. There are about 175,000 Hindus mainly of Lhotshampa ethnicity living in Bhutan. They form about 23% of the country's population, and Hinduism is the second largest religion of Bhutan.

Hinduism in Bhutan is followed mainly by the ethnic Lhotshampa. The Shaivite, Vaishnavite, Shakta, Ganapathi, Puranic, and Vedic schools of thought are represented among Hindus.

The first Hindu temple was constructed in Thimphu in 2012 by the Je Khenpo, Chief Abbot of Bhutan, and Hindus practice their religion in small to medium-sized groups.

Hinduism is more common among the Lhotshampa ethnic group, although a fair number of ethnic Lhotshampa follow Buddhism as well. Since 2015, Hinduism is also considered as the national religion of Bhutan.

The government of Bhutan recognizes significant Buddhist and Hindu religious holidays as public holidays.

The Hindu Dharma Samudaya of Bhutan (HDSB) is the Hindu religious organization, established in 2009. It is registered with the Chhoedey Lhentshog, the Commission for Religious Organizations of Bhutan. HDSB is dedicated to promote spiritual traditions and practices of Hinduism aka Sanatana Dharma in Bhutan so to foster and strengthen human values. Its head office in the capital city, Thimphu, the organization is managed by a board of directors of volunteers comprising representatives from Hindu priests and other HDSB members who are elected at an annual general meeting.

Members of the Hindu Dharmic Samudaya cites strong official support for Hindu religious practice.

== Bon ==
Bon, the country's animist and shamanistic belief system, revolves around the worship of nature and predates Buddhism. Bon is portrayed in Buddhist sources as anti-Buddhist and a source of resistance to Buddhism's spread in eighth-century Tibet. Bon priests were considered skilled in black magic and animal sacrifices, needing spiritual conversion to Buddhism. Yet, despite centuries of Buddhist opposition, Bon traditions persist in Bhutan, with annual celebrations and everyday involvement in healing and protective Bon rituals.

Although Bön priests often officiate and include Bön rituals in Buddhist festivals, very few citizens adhere exclusively to this religious group.

== Christianity ==
Christianity is followed by a tiny minority with estimated 0.5% of the Population in Bhutan. Christianity was first brought to Bhutan in the late 17th century by Portuguese Jesuits, but the teachings failed to gain much traction among the devout Bhutanese Buddhists. A few Christians living in Assam and Bengal and other States have Bhutanese origins. The government of Bhutan did not recognize any Christian holidays as public holidays.

== Islam ==
Research regarding the history of Islam in Bhutan is scarce, though its presence likely stems from early migrations originating in Neighbouring regions. As a small and relatively discreet minority, the Muslim community maintains its own internal diversity, exemplified by the Ahmadiyya group's mosque completion in 2008.

Estimates of the Muslim population have fluctuated significantly over time. Historical data from the U.S. Library of Congress indicated that Muslims comprised approximately 5% of Bhutan's population in 1989. However, Pew Research Center gave two figures for 2010: one suggested a presence of roughly 1% (approx. 7,000 people), the other estimate placed the figure around 0.2%. Furthermore, while some Islamic organizations and other sources gives higher ratios, Islam and other religions except Hindus and Buddhism, currently lacks official recognition under the Constitution of Bhutan.

== Freedom and regulation of religion ==
The law provides for freedom of religion; the religious institutions and personalities have a duty "to promote the spiritual heritage of the country while also ensuring that religion remains separate from politics" and that religious institutions and personalities remain "above politics." Reflecting the government's stated purpose of preserving individuals' religious and cultural values, the above prohibitive clauses in the Constitution have been interpreted to apply to proselytism and to prohibit religious personalities from voting, respectively.

The Religious Organizations Act of 2007 aims to protect and preserve the spiritual heritage of Bhutan through providing for the registration and administration of religious organizations. To meet those goals, the Act creates the Chhoedey Lhentshog as the regulatory authority on religious organizations. This body regulates, monitors, and keeps records on all religious organizations in Bhutan, which are in turn required to register and maintain specified corporate formalities.

In 2022, Freedom House rated Bhutan's religious freedom as 2 out of 4, noting that the constitution protects freedom of religion, but local authorities are known to harass non-Buddhists and people have experienced pressure to participate in Buddhist ceremonies and practices.

== See also ==
- List of Buddhist temples in Bhutan
- Freedom of religion in Bhutan
