= Politics of Bhutan =

The politics of Bhutan historically took place under an absolute monarchy, but has since 2008 been characterized as a constitutional monarchy. The King of Bhutan is the head of state. The executive power is exercised by the Lhengye Zhungtshog, or council of ministers, headed by the Prime Minister. Legislative power is vested in the bicameral Parliament, both the upper house, National Council, and the lower house, National Assembly.

Historically, Bhutan was governed as an absolute monarchy. Democratization occurred with the 2007–2008 Bhutanese National Council election. A royal edict issued on April 22, 2007 lifted the previous ban on political parties in anticipation of the National Assembly elections in the following year. In 2008, Bhutan adopted its first modern Constitution, codifying the institutions of government and the legal framework for a democratic multi-party system.

The Economist Intelligence Unit rated Bhutan a "hybrid regime" in 2023.

== Sovereignty ==
Bhutanese external relations and foreign policies were put under British control following the 1910 Treaty of Punakha. However, due to the policy of self-imposed isolationism, the effect of the treaty was limited to an extent. After Indian independence in 1949, Bhutan and India agreed to a ten-article, perpetual treaty which effectively continued the relationship, but with India replacing the United Kingdom. India agreed not to interfere in Bhutan's internal relations, while Bhutan agreed "to be guided by the advice of the Government of India in regard to its external relations" (Article 2). The treaty also established free trade and full extradition between the two countries.

In February 2007, the Indo-Bhutan Friendship Treaty was substantially revised with all references to phrases such as "will be guided" deleted, thus eliminating the last lingering doubts about the sovereign and independent status of Bhutan.

== Branches of government ==
The Constitution of Bhutan provides for a government consisting of three main branches – executive, legislative, and judicial – plus the de facto apolitical Dratshang Lhentshog (Monastic Affairs Commission) of the Drukpa Kagyu state religion. The secular and religious branches of government are unified in the person of the Druk Gyalpo (King of Bhutan).

The trichotomy of secular government is not absolute. There are many independent commissions, agencies, and institutions that operate outside this general framework, such as the Royal Monetary Authority and Election Commission. There are also agencies whose members are drawn from more than one branch of government, such as the Judicial Commission. In addition, there are several ministries within the cabinet executive branch, such as the Ministry of Home and Cultural Affairs, which in turn delegate powers to subsidiary departments according to legislation by the legislative branch. The legislative branch itself oversees devolved local governments.

=== Executive branch ===
Main office-holders
Office	Name	Party	Since
King	Jigme Khesar Namgyel Wangchuck		9 December 2006
Prime Minister	Tshering Tobgay	People's Democratic Party	10 January 2024

Bhutan's head of state is the Druk Gyalpo ("Dragon King"). Although his title is hereditary, he must retire by age 65, and he can be removed by a two-thirds majority vote by the parliament followed by a national referendum, which must pass by a simple majority in all twenty districts of the country. Prior to 2008, a similar abdication process existed under which the unicameral National Assembly, or Tshogdu could force the king to abdicate.

The Je Khenpo is the highest religious official of Bhutan and head of the Dratshang Lhentshog (Monastic Affairs Commission). He is typically viewed as the closest and most powerful advisor to the King of Bhutan. The 70th and present Je Khenpo is Jigme Chhoeda.

Bhutan's head of government is its Prime Minister. The Prime Minister is nominated by the party that wins the most seats in the National Assembly and heads the executive cabinet, called the Lhengye Zhungtshog (Council of Ministers).

In 1998, the monarch's executive powers were transferred to the Council of Ministers, or Lhengye Zhungtshog (cabinet). At the time, candidates for the Council of Ministers were elected by the National Assembly for a fixed five-year term and had to be a part of the legislative assembly. The cabinet was headed by the Prime Minister, who was the head of government. The post of Prime Minister rotated each year between the five candidates who secured the highest number of votes. The 2005 draft Constitution of Bhutan included provision for a two-party democratic system that was unveiled after four years of preparation. Previously, the candidates to the cabinet Council of Ministers (Lhengye Zhungtshog) were nominated by the monarch, elected by the National Assembly. The members served fixed, five-year terms. There was also a Royal Advisory Council (Lodoi Tsokde), members nominated by the monarch.

=== Legislative branch ===
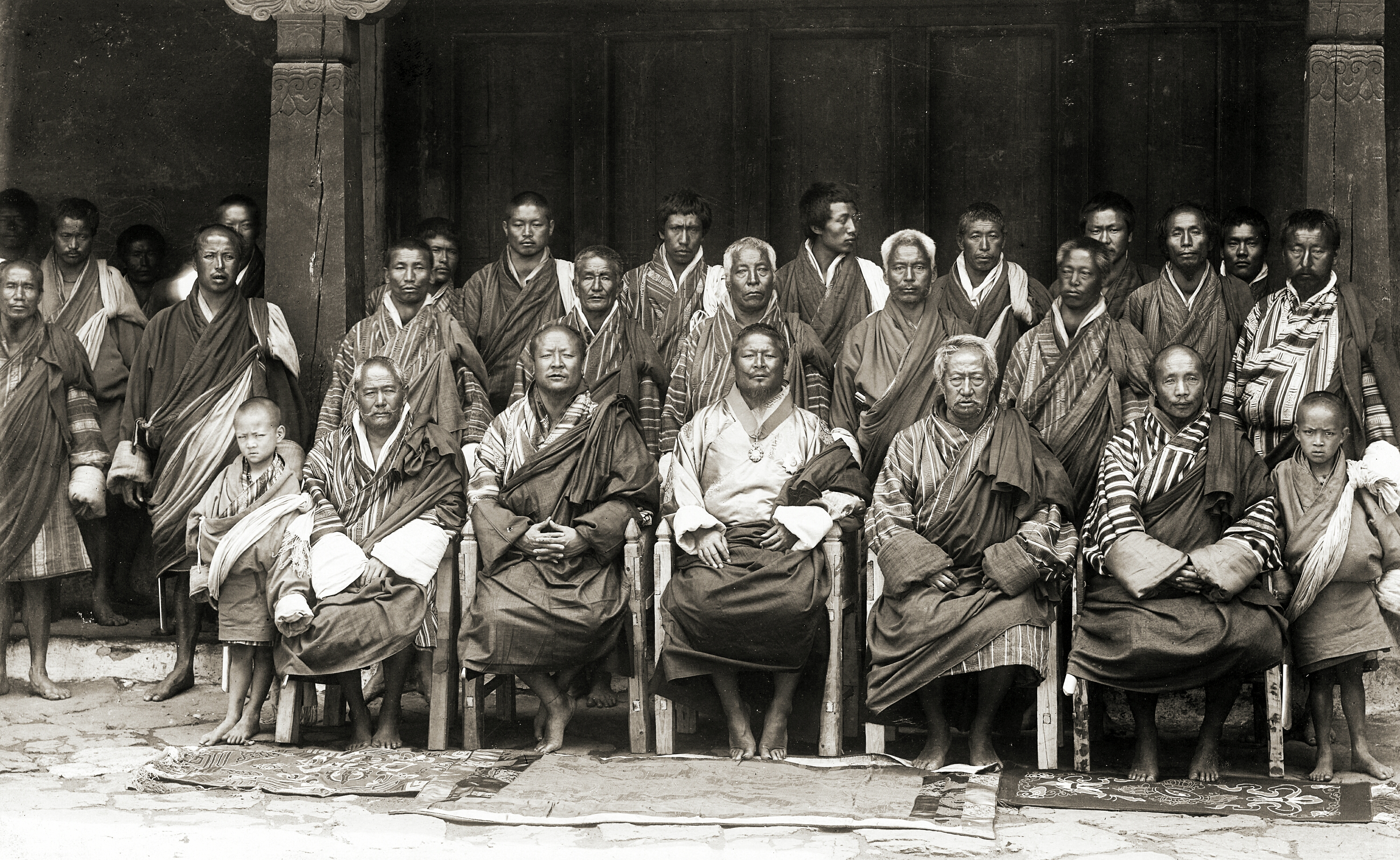
Ugyen Wangchuk with his councilors at Punakha, Bhutan (1905)

Bhutan elects its legislative branch through universal suffrage under the Constitution of 2008. The Bhutanese parliament is bicameral, consisting of a National Council (upper house) and a National Assembly (lower house).

Prior to 2008, the legislative branch was the unicameral Tshogdu. The Tshogdu had 150 members, 106 members elected at various dates for a three-year term in single-seat constituencies, 34 appointed members and 10 representatives of the monastic body. Suffrage in Bhutan at that time was unique in that each family unit, rather than individual, had one vote.

==== Political parties and elections ====
In Bhutan, political parties, elections, and referendums are overseen by the Election Commission, an independent government regulatory agency.

Candidates for most elections and appointments in Bhutan must be non-partisan; however, political parties may slate candidates for seats in the National Assembly. The party that wins the most seats nominates the Prime Minister. The first Prime Minister, Jigme Thinley, was a member of the Bhutan Peace and Prosperity Party. The second Prime Minister, Tshering Tobgay, headed the People's Democratic Party. The third Prime Minister, Lotay Tshering, headed the Druk Nyamrup Tshogpa. As of January 2024, Tshering Tobgay returned as Prime Minister after the 2023–24 general election, again representing the People's Democratic Party.

Political pressure groups include the Buddhist clergy; ethnic Nepalese organizations leading militant anti-government campaign; Indian merchant community and the exiled United Front for Democracy.

=== Judicial branch ===
Bhutan's legal system is based on codes established by Zhabdrung Ngawang Namgyal in 17th century and influenced by Anglo-Indian common law. Under the Constitution of 2008, the Judicial branch consists of the Supreme Court, the High Court, and twenty Dzongkhag Courts. For thirteen dungkhag jurisdictions in six Dzongkhags, Dungkhag Courts are the courts of first instance. In all jurisdictions outside dungkhags, the Dzongkhag Courts are the civil and criminal courts of first instance. The High Court is the first court of appeal, and the Supreme Court is the court of final appeal. The Supreme Court also has original jurisdiction over Constitutional questions and matters of national importance referred by the King. Judges of the Supreme and High courts are appointed by the King, and consists of one Chief Justice and four Drangpons (Associate Justices).

Before 2008 in the Bhutanese judicial system, the monarch was the final court of appeal (the "Supreme Court of Appeal"), and local government officials adjudicated minor crimes. The Royal High Court of Bhutan was the highest court in the country and had original jurisdiction over the twenty districts of the nation. Judicial appointments were made by the monarch, and could be recalled by him at any time.

==== Legal system ====
The criminal justice system is based on trial before a panel of judges, and therefore resembles more the Napoleonic than the British or American adversarial systems. The prosecutor, a government employee, seeks to obtain an acknowledgement of culpability from the accused. If this happens quickly, the sentencing may be lenient. If culpability is obvious but the accused refuses to admit to it, the sentence may be correspondingly severe. Judges may dismiss the case for lack of proof at any time. Recent legislation defines required proof of guilt more closely, providing increased protection against trivial or mistaken charges. Minor criminal offences may be tried by the dzongkhag Drangpon (District Judge).

Bhutan has not accepted compulsory International Court of Justice jurisdiction.

== Administrative divisions ==
Bhutan is divided in 20 districts (dzongkhag, singular and plural); Bumthang, Chukha, Dagana, Gasa, Ha, Lhuntse, Mongar, Paro, Pemagatshel, Punakha, Samdrup Jongkhar, Samtse, Sarpang, Thimphu, Trashirang, Trashiyangtse, Trongsa, Tsirang, Wangdue Phodrang, and Zhemgang.

== International organization participation ==
Bhutan is member of the AsDB, BIMSTEC, CP, ESCAP, FAO, G-77, IBRD, ICAO, IDA, IFAD, IFC, IMF, Intelsat, Interpol, IOC, ITU, NAM, OPCW, SAARC, UN, UNCTAD, UNESCO, UNIDO, UPU, WHO, WIPO, WMO, WToO.

== See also ==
- Constitution of Bhutan
- List of political parties in Bhutan
