= Military history of Bhutan =

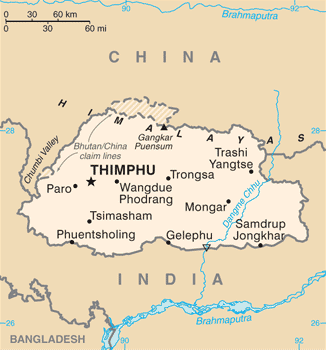
Bhutan is bordered to the north by China, and to the west, south, and east by India. The military of Bhutan has relied on Indian support for training and materials since 1949.

The military history of Bhutan begins with the Battle of Five Lamas in 1634, marking Bhutan's emergence as a nation under the secular and religious leadership of Zhabdrung Ngawang Namgyal. Before Bhutan emerged as a separate nation, it remained on the periphery of Tibetan military and political influence. The region that became Bhutan was host to several battles and waves of refugees from turmoil in Tibet. After its founding, Bhutan was invaded numerous times by outside forces, namely Tibetans, Mongols, and the British. Bhutan meanwhile invaded its traditional tributaries in Sikkim, Cooch Behar, and the Duars.

Bhutan effectively ceased all international military hostilities after the Anglo-Bhutanese War in 1865.

Bhutan has engaged only in limited domestic operations against Indian separatist groups in recent times, such as Operation All Clear in 2003.

== Ancient history ==
The earliest military history of Bhutan is closely entwined with the history of Tibet. Between the 9th century and Bhutan's emergence as a nation in the early 17th century, Bhutanese territory hosted Tibetan military settlements, waves of refugees coming from Tibet due to religious and political strife in Tibet, and some conflict between Tibetan and Indian people.

In 824 AD, Tibetan King Tritsun Desten (reigned 816–836; also called Raelpachen), the grandson of Trisong Detsen, went to war with an Indian ruler in Bhutan, driving him out. Tibetan troops who remained in Bhutan were called Milog, meaning "those that will not return." The region they settle were referred to as Tshochhen Gyed. Its eight parts or divisions were Wang, Be, Med, Kawang, Chang, Thi, Thim, and Lar.

In 836, Tritsun Desten was murdered by agents of his brother Langdharma (reigned 836–842). Tibetan people sought refuge in Bhutan from ensuing political and religious upheaval during the reign of Langdharma. After Langdharma's assassination in 842, Tibetans continued to flee to western Bhutan, the Ngalop homeland. The centuries that followed, known as the Era of Fragmentation, were characterized by their lack of political cohesion. During much of this period, the dominant Bhutanese polity was the Kingdom of Bumthang.

In the late 9th century, Tibetan forces expelled Indian princes from parts of modern Bhutan. Tibetans in this period and location developed the roots of Ngalop culture.

By the 11th century, Tibetan-Mongol forces were occupying the whole of Bhutan. More waves of Tibetans sought refuge in Bhutan from religious persecution. Charismatic lamas became the de facto leaders of regions in western Bhutan. In the 1360s, a wave of Tibetan Gelugpa monks fled to Bhutan.

== Early history ==
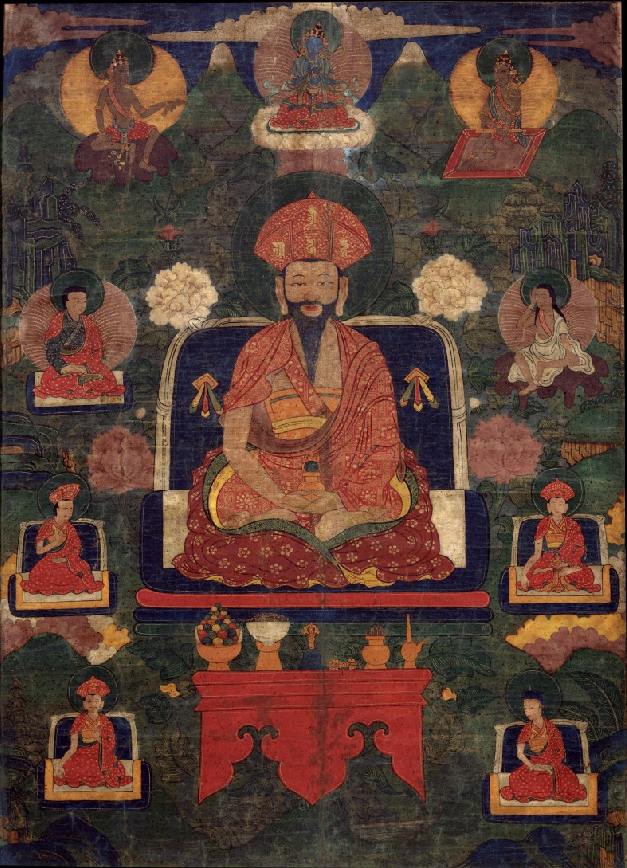
Ngawang Namgyal's victory at the Second Battle of Simtokha Dzong in 1634, paved the way for the unification of Bhutan under his rule.

The military history of Bhutan as a nation begins with the conflict between a Drukpa monk named Ngawang Namgyal (who later took the title of Zhabdrung) and the rulers of Tibet.

In 1616, Ngawang Namgyal, facing arrest and following visions in which it is said that the chief guardian deities of Bhutan offered him a home, left Tibet to establish a new base in western Bhutan, founding Cheri Monastery at the head of Thimphu valley. During the Bhutanese period of theocratic rule (1616–1907), there was no regular standing army. The bow and arrow were among the principal means of arming the population during frequent upheavals and invasions. During times of crisis, the government raised militias from among local lords' retinues, all commanded by one dapon ('arrow chief'), a title used through modern times.

Around 1627, the Zhabdrung built Simtokha Dzong at the entrance to Thimphu valley. From this dzong he exerted control over traffic between the powerful Paro valley to the west and Trongsa valley to the east. In 1627, during the first war against Karma Tenkyong of Tibet, two Portuguese Jesuit priests (Estêvão Cacella and João Cabral) were the first recorded Europeans to visit Bhutan on their way to Tibet. They met with Ngawang Namgyal, presented him with firearms, gunpowder and a telescope, and offered him their services in the war against Tibet, but the Zhabdrung declined the offer. After a stay of nearly eight months, Cacella wrote a long letter from the Chagri Monastery reporting the travel.

In 1629 and 1631, attempted Tibetan invasions under Karma Tenkyong failed. In 1634, Zhabdrung Ngawang Namgyal prevailed in the Battle of Five Lamas over the Tibetan and Bhutanese forces allied against him. The Zhabdrung was thus the first to unite Bhutan into a single country. The Zhabdrung established the Drukpa Lineage as the state religion under the dual system of government and codified the system of laws known as the Tsa Yig, based on Buddhist religious law (dharma).

In 1639, another attempted invasion by Karma Tenkyong failed, followed by a joint Mongol-Tibetan force in 1643 under Güshi Khan that sought to destroy Nyingmapa refugees who had fled to Bhutan, Sikkim, and Nepal. The Mongols had seized control of religious and civil power in Tibet in the 1630s and established Gelugpa as the state religion. Bhutanese rivals of Ngawang Namgyal encouraged the Mongol intrusion, but the Mongol force was easily defeated in the humid lowlands of southern Bhutan. In 1647, another attempted Tibetan invasion failed.

In 1680 and 1700, Bhutan invaded Sikkim. In 1714, Tibetan forces, aided by the Mongols, again invaded Bhutan but failed to gain control.

Many Bhutanese slaves during this period originated from Sikkim and Duars, objects of repeated raids by Bhutan over the centuries. A large number of these slaves were pressed into military service, and some went on to fill high posts in the Bhutanese armed forces.

== Treaty of Sinchula ==
In the 18th century, Bhutan established its control over Cooch Behar and the Duars. As the presence of the British Empire grew in the region through the 19th century, these territories, as well as Bhutan's neighbor Sikkim, came under British control.

In 1730, Cooch Behar first requested Bhutanese assistance in repelling Mughal Empire encroachments, establishing a dependent relationship with Bhutan. In 1770, Bhutan again invaded Sikkim, supported by troops from Cooch Behar.

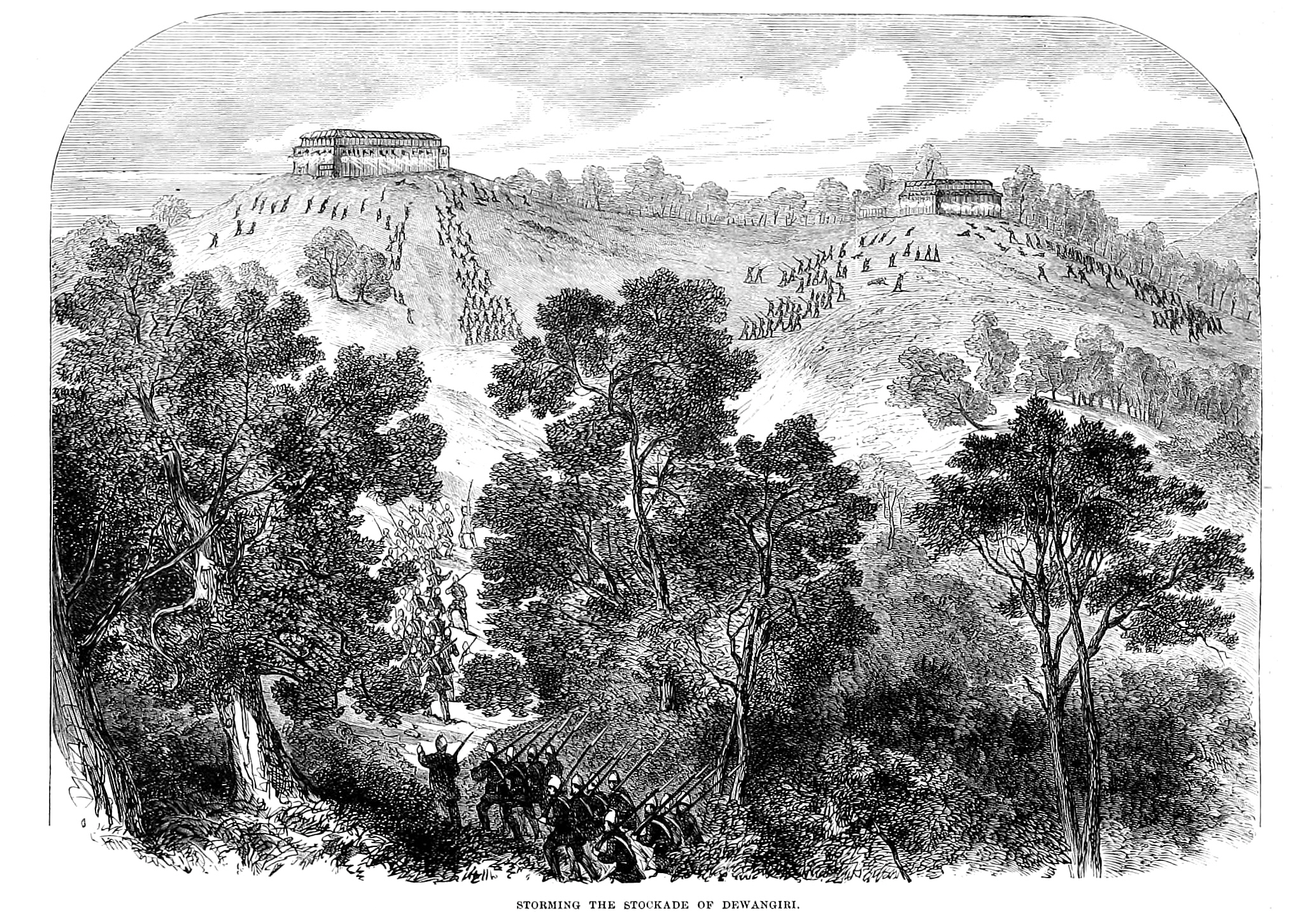
British forces storm the Dewangiri fort in 1865, during the Bhutan War.

In 1772, during a succession dispute in Cooch Behar, the Druk Desi's nominee for the throne was opposed by a rival who invited British troops, who drove out Bhutanese garrison. The city, until that time a Bhutanese dependency, became a dependency of the British East India Company. The Druk Desi petitioned Lhasa unsuccessfully for assistance.

On 25 April 1774, the Druk Desi signed a Treaty of Peace with the British East India Company. Under the treaty, Bhutan returned to its pre-1730 boundaries and allowed the British to harvest timber in Bhutan. In 1784, British government turned over to Bhutan the Bengal Duars territory, where boundaries had been poorly defined. As in its other foreign territories, Bhutan left administration of the Bengal Duars territory to local officials and collected its revenues.

In 1838, after a prior failed attempt, the British mission to Thimphu offered Bhutan a treaty providing for the extradition of Bhutanese officials responsible for incursions into Assam, free and unrestricted commerce between India and Bhutan, and settlement of Bhutan's debt to the British. In an attempt to protect its independence, Bhutan rejected the British offer. In 1841, the British annexed the Bhutanese-controlled Assam Duars, paying a compensation of 10,000 rupees a year to Bhutan. The following year, Bhutan ceded control of the troublesome Bengal Duars to Britain.

In 1862, Bhutanese forces raided Sikkim and Cooch Behar. The British responded by withholding all compensation payments and demanding release of all captives and return of stolen property. These demands went unheeded by the Druk Desi, as he was alleged to be unaware of frontier officials' raids. In 1864, Britain sent a peace mission to Bhutan in the wake of a recent civil war, during a period when two rival claimants to the office of Druk Desi competed for power. Though the British attempted to deal with both Druk Desis, the peace mission was rejected by Bhutan.

In November 1864, Britain declared war on Bhutan over control of its traditional dependencies. The Bhutan War lasted five months, resulting in Bhutan's defeat and loss of Assam Duars and Bengal Duars, as well as the eighty-three-square-kilometer territory of Dewangiri in southeastern Bhutan, to the British. In return, Bhutan was awarded an annual subsidy of 50,000 rupees under the Treaty of Sinchula, signed 11 November 1865.

== Monarchy and Treaty of Punakha ==
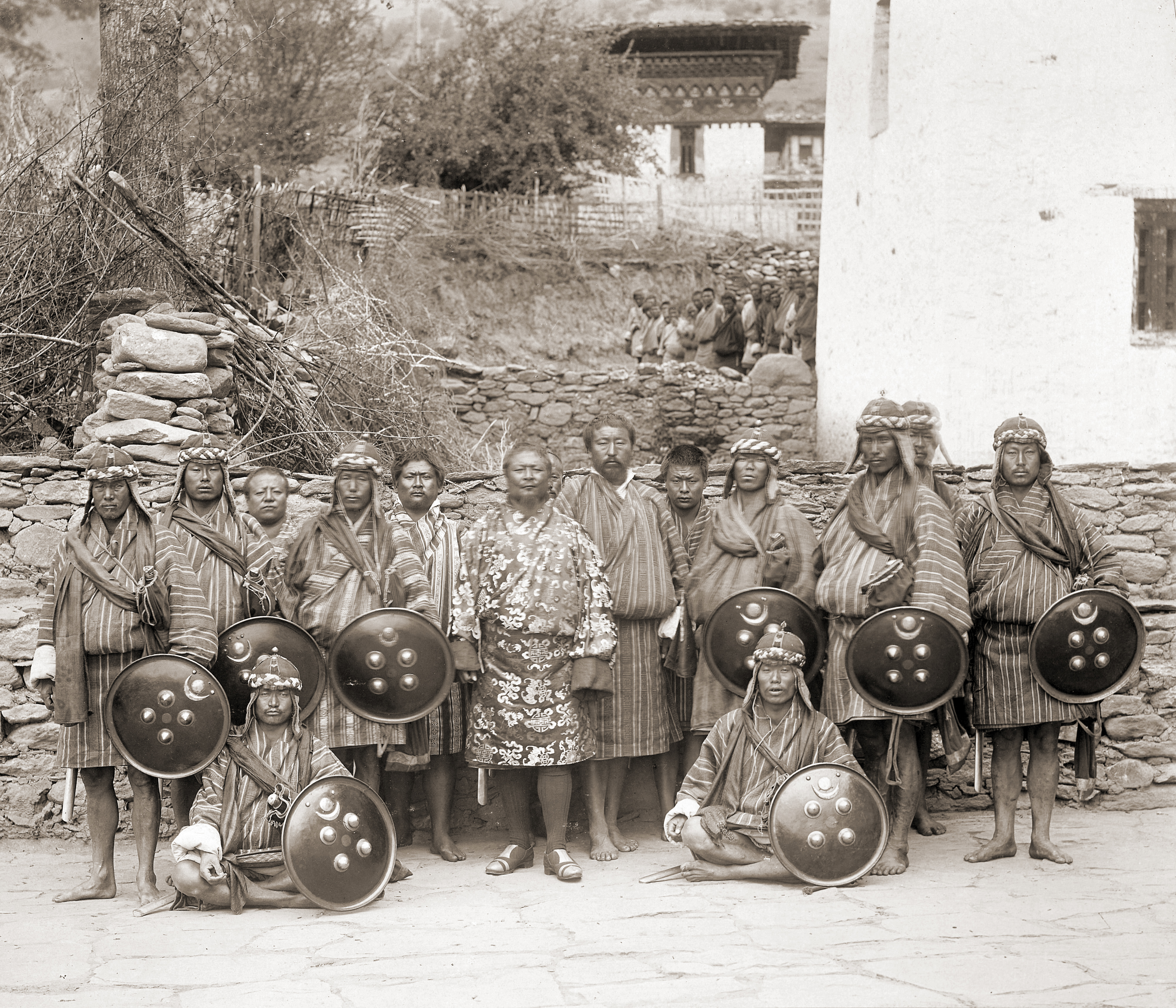
The future King of Bhutan, Ugyen Wangchuk, with his bodyguards in 1905.

In the 1870s and 1880s, renewed conflict among regional rivals—primarily the pro-British penlop of Trongsa and the anti-British, pro-Tibetan penlop of Paro—resulted in the ascendancy of Trongsa Penlop Ugyen Wangchuck. By 1885, he had put down unrest across Bhutan, consolidated power, and cultivated closer ties with British India. Between 1903 and 1904, Ugyen Wangchuck volunteered to accompany a British mission to Lhasa as a mediator in the British expedition to Tibet and subsequent Anglo-Tibetan Convention. In return, he was knighted and thereafter continued to accrue greater power in Bhutan.

On 8 January 1910, the Treaty of Punakha amended two articles of the 1865 Treaty of Sinchula: the British agreed to double the annual stipend to 100,000 rupees and "to exercise no interference in the internal administration of Bhutan." In turn, Bhutan agreed "to be guided by the advice of the British Government in regard to its external relations."

In 1943, the Kingdom of Bhutan began to raise its first organized an army at Trongsa, recruiting 30 Kheng troops from Mongar. During the late 1940s, the second King of Bhutan, Jigme Wangchuck, began sending recruits for training by the Indian Army in Shillong. The army recruited a further 240 men from Bumthang, Kurtoe, Mongar, and Trashigang. After basic training, the number of enlisted men came to 120 soldiers, including 20 instructors. From early on, the Bhutanese army operated security checkpoints in the southern region of the kingdom.

In 1947, as the British Empire left India, direct ties to the British ended, and Bhutan remained relatively isolated from international affairs, until 1949. That year, India and Bhutan signed the Treaty of Peace and Friendship, providing that India would not interfere in Bhutan's internal affairs, but that Bhutan would be guided by India in its foreign policy. This was the first international agreement that unambiguously recognized Bhutan's independence and sovereignty. The same year, India ceded to Bhutan some territories lost to the British in the 1865 Treaty of Sinchula.

== Modern history ==
The modern Bhutanese armed forces comprise the Royal Bhutan Army (RBA), Royal Bodyguards (RBG), militia, and the Royal Bhutan Police. As Bhutan is a landlocked country, it has no navy. Nor does Bhutan have an air force, although the Royal Bhutan Army maintains a very small air armament possessing no combat capabilities, used solely for transport. The Royal Bodyguards are a branch of the RBA responsible for the security of the King of Bhutan, the Royal Family, and other VIPs.

Under defense agreements in place since 1949, India is responsible for military training, arms supplies and the air defense of Bhutan. This agreement was updated in February 2007 with a new treaty of friendship, replacing the 1949 treaty, ending India's formal role in guiding Bhutan's foreign policy, and removing the requirement for Bhutan to get India's permission to import arms.

Bhutan's most recent military engagements targeted Indian separatist groups operating inside Bhutan. During Operation All Clear in December 2003, Bhutanese armed forces flushed Indian militants out of Bhutan.

=== Royal Bhutan Army ===
The Royal Bhutan Army was formed in the 1950s in response to the Chinese takeover and subsequent People's Liberation Army actions in Tibet and under intense pressure by India. In 1958, the royal government introduced a conscription system and plans for a standing army of 2,500 soldiers. The Indian government had also repeatedly urged and pressured Bhutan to end its neutrality or isolationist policy and accept Indian economic and military assistance. This was because India considered Bhutan its most vulnerable sector in its strategic defense system in regard to China. When Bhutan accepted the Indian offer, the Indian Army became responsible for the training and equipping of the RBA.

The RBA established its first domestic training center at Bumthang. Around 1951, it was relocated to Lingkana and Tashichho Dzong. In 1959, another training center was established at Tencholing, which also served as the RBA general headquarters. In 1963, the Army Headquarters was moved to Dradimakhang, Thimphu. During the 1960s, the RBA established four wings, numbered as Wing 1 (Gunitsawa), Wing 2 (Changju), Wing 3 (Laya & Lingzhi), and Wing 4 (Trashigang).

By 1968, the RBA consisted of 4,850 soldiers, with a recruiting goal of 600 additional soldiers a year. By 1990, the RBA was a force of 6,000 soldiers. In June 2007, the RBA stood at 9,021 active-duty personnel. By 2008, this number was reduced to 8,000 active-duty personnel, in line with an initiative introduced in 2005 by the Royal Government of Bhutan to reduce the strength of the RBA while increasing militia training of the Bhutanese population.

Although women have served in the RBA since at least 1989, it appears to have been rare until 2021, when 150 women became the first official cohort of women to complete their military training and be given postings. 151 men graduated alongside the women. The 2022 set of graduates consisted of 149 women and 151 men.

The Indian Army maintains a training mission in Bhutan, known as the Indian Military Training Team (IMTRAT), responsible for the military training of RBA and RBG personnel. RBA and RBG officers are sent for training at the National Defence Academy (NDA) in Pune, and Indian Military Academy (IMA) in Dehradun. Project DANTAK of the Border Roads Organisation, a sub-division of the Indian Army Corps of Engineers, has been operating in Bhutan since May 1961. Since then, Project DANTAK has been responsible for the construction and maintenance of over 1,500 km of roads and bridges, Paro Airport and a disused airfield at Yangphula, heliports, and other infrastructure.

IMTRAT is a military training mission in western Bhutan. Its primary role is training the personnel of the Royal Bhutan Army (RBA). It does not serve as a combat force and does not conduct operational deployments.

Bhutan's border defense, internal security, and combat operations fall under the Royal Bhutan Army (RBA).

During actual military engagements on Bhutanese soil, such as the 2003 Operation All Clear against Indian militant camps in southern Bhutan, combat operations were executed entirely by the Royal Bhutan Army (RBA).

During the Operation All Clear in December 2003, India initially offered to send a large deployment of Indian Army troops into southern Bhutan to clear out the camps established by Northeast Indian militant groups. His Majesty the Fourth King, Jigme Singye Wangchuck, declined the offer to protect Bhutan's sovereignty and ensure no foreign military conducted combat operations on Bhutanese soil. Combat operations were executed entirely by the Royal Bhutan Army (RBA).

==== Combat operations ====
The Kingdom of Bhutan has engaged solely in domestic combat operations against Indian separatist groups during the winter of 2003–2004. Secessionist militant groups active in India, having established bases in southern Bhutan, defied an ultimatum to leave the kingdom. The Royal Bhutan Army engaged militant camps and eliminated them all in Operation All Clear.

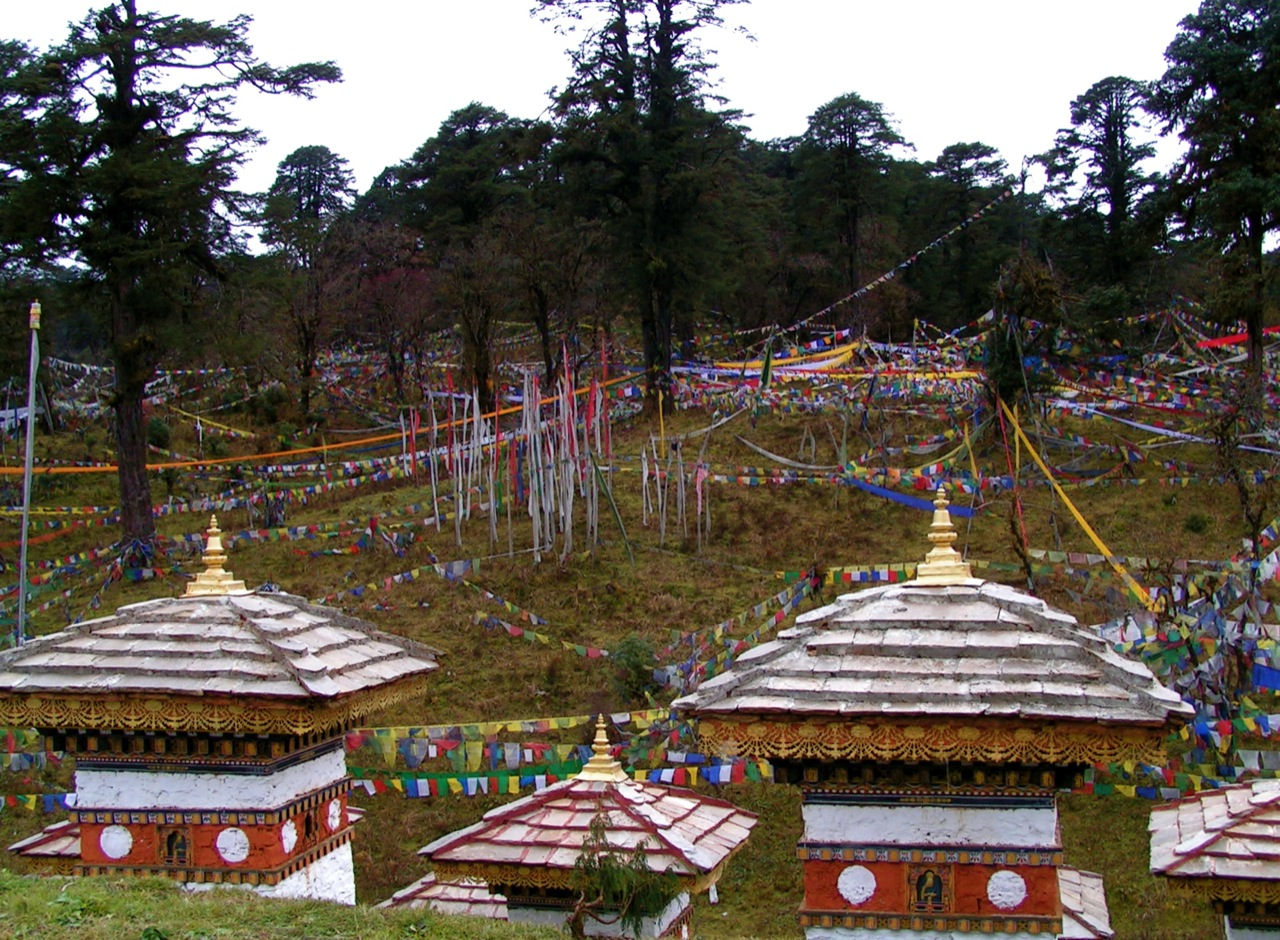
108 chörten were built on the Dochu-La pass to commemorate Operation All Clear.

During the early 1990s, Indian separatist groups, namely the United Liberation Front of Asom (ULFA), National Democratic Front of Bodoland (NDFB), and Kamtapur Liberation Organization (KLO), had begun to clandestinely set up camps in Bhutan's dense southern jungles. These camps were used to train cadres, store equipment, and launch attacks on targets in India. The Bhutanese government became aware of their presence in 1996 and from 1997, the issue was regularly discussed in the National Assembly. The Government of India began exerting diplomatic pressure on the Royal Government to remove the militant presence and offered conducting joint military operations against the militants. The Royal Government preferring a peaceful solution, declined the offer and instead initiated dialogue with the militant groups in 1998.

By December 2003, negotiations failed to produce any agreement and the Royal Government unable to tolerate their presence any longer issued a 48-hour ultimatum on 13 December. On 15 December the RBA commenced military operations, dubbed Operation All Clear, against the militant groups. A combined RBA and RBG force of 6,000, operating out of 20 camps established during the six years of negotiations, attacked an estimated 3,000 militants spread across 30 militant camps. By 27 December 2003, all 30 militant camps had been captured. Additionally, the RBA seized "more than 500 AK 47/56 assault rifles and 328 other assorted weapons including rocket launchers and mortars, along with more than 100,000 rounds of ammunition. An anti-aircraft gun was also found at the site of the GHQ of the ULFA."

By 3 January 2004, all 30 militant camps (14 ULFA camps, 11 NDFB camps, 5 KLO camps) with an additional 35 observation posts, were destroyed and the militants dislodged. A total of 485 ULFA, NDFB, and KLO militants were killed, while those captured along with seized weapons and ammunition were handed over to the Government of India. Captured non-combatants were handed over to Assamese civil authorities. The RBA suffered 11 soldiers KIA, and 35 WIA.

=== Royal Bhutan Police ===
The Royal Bhutan Police is responsible for maintaining law and order and prevention of crime in Bhutan. It was formed on 1 September 1965 with 555 personnel reassigned from the Royal Bhutan Army. It was then called the "Bhutan Frontier Guards." Its independent statutory basis was first codified with the Royal Bhutan Police Act of 1980. This framework was repealed and replaced in its entirety by the Royal Bhutan Police Act of 2009. Since 2009, the mandate of the Royal Bhutan Police has grown to include managing prisons, facilitating youth development and rehabilitation, and disaster management.

== See also ==
- History of Bhutan
- Military of Bhutan
- Foreign relations of Bhutan
