= Haa Wangchuk Lo Dzong =

Fortress in Haa, Bhutan

- Part of Wangchuk Lo Dzong Military School
- Ha, Ha District in Bhutan
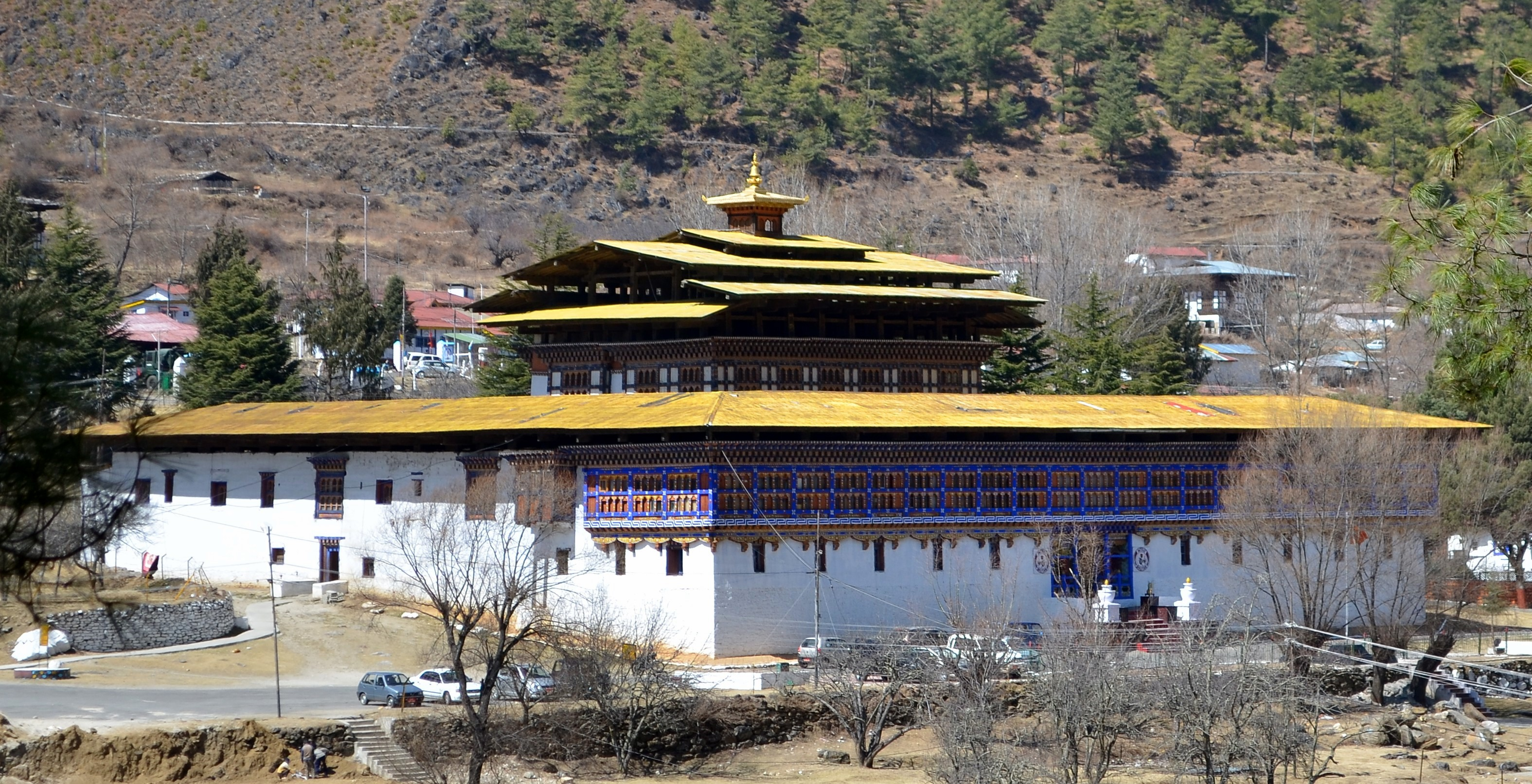
- Wangchuk Lo Dzong in 2011

Site information
- Type: Dzong
- Owner: Royal Bhutan Army
- Controlled by: Indian Military Training Team
- Open to the public: Yes
- Condition: Fuctional

Location
- Location in Bhutan
- Coordinates: 27°22′15″N 89°17′33″E

Site history
- Built: 1915; 111 years ago
- Built by: Kazi Ugyen Dorjee

Haa Wangchuk Lo Dzong, also referred to as Haa Dzong or Wangchuk Lo Dzong, is a dzong in Ha District, Bhutan. It houses government offices of the Royal Bhutan Army and is the Headquarters of the Indian Military Training Team.

== History ==
In 1895, the first dzong named Haa Damcho Dzong would be build by Haa Drungpa Ugyen Dorji. It was build to serve as defense against Tibetan invasions from the Chumbi valley, seat of local administration and served as a regional grain reservoir. In 1913, the dzong would be destroyed by a fire and would be abandoned. Drungpa Kazi Ugyen Dorjee would levy labour tax on Ha to build a new dzong. In 1915, the new dzong would be build a kilometer from the original site and would be named Dzongsar Wangchuk Lho Dzong and would be used as headquarters for Ha District.

On 16 October 1962, the responsibly for the dzong would be transferred to the Indian Military Training Team who would set up offices in it. In 1989, the dzong and the surrounding land would be registered under the Royal Bhutan Army, who would use the land as a training ground. The utse (central tower) would be opened back to the public and managed by Haa Dratshang.
