= Vehicle registration plates of Bhutan =

Kingdom of Bhutan
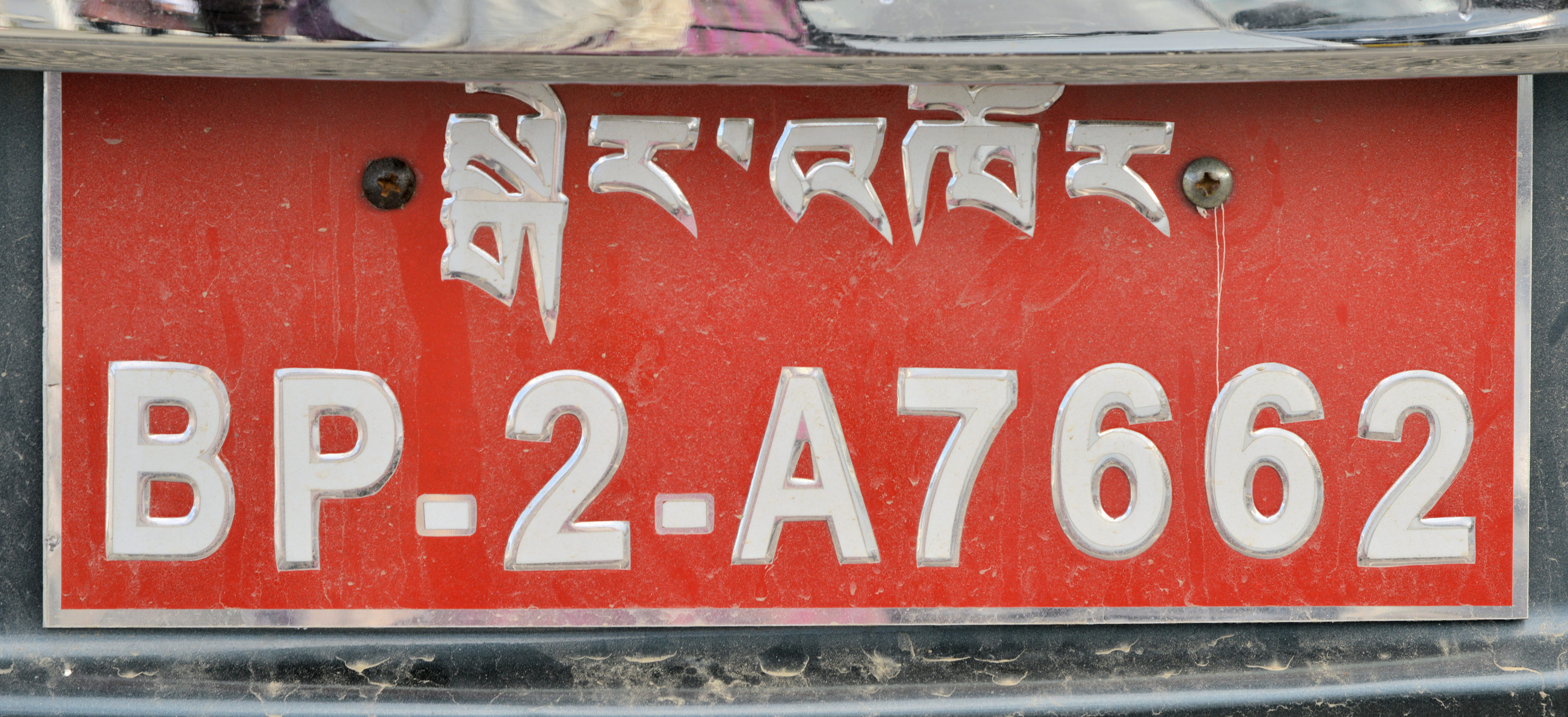
- Regular legal private standard number plate from Bhutan.
- Country: Bhutan
- Country code: None

Current series
- Serial format: AB-1-C1234
- Colour (front): White on red
- Colour (rear): White on red

Vehicle license plates in Bhutan are issued and regulated by the Road Safety and Transport Authority of The Royal Government of Bhutan.

The current format is XX-N-X0000, where,

- XX is the type (BP/BT/BG)
- N is the area code from 1 to 5,
- 1. Gasa, Haa, Paro, Punakha, Thimphu, Wangdue Phodrang
- 2. Chukha, Samtse
- 3. Bumthang, Dagana, Sarpang, Trongsa, Tsirang, Zhemgang
- 4. Pemagatshel, Sandrup Jonkhar
- 5. Lhuntse, Mongar, Trashigang, Trashiyangtse
- X is a letter from A-Z, and
- XXXX is the vehicle number.

== Types of registration plate ==
=== Private ===
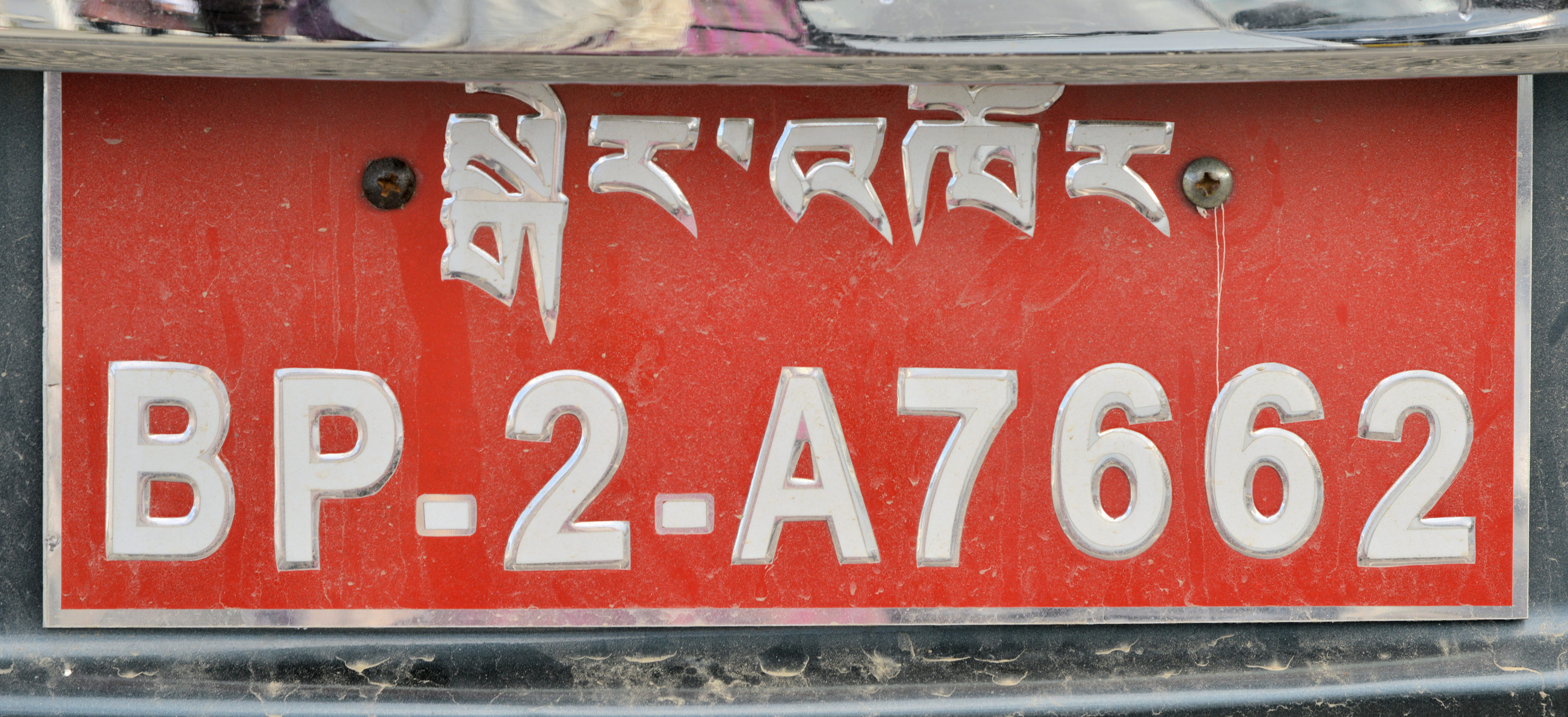

The current license plate for private vehicles in Bhutan is composed of letters and digits in the BP-N-ANNNN format (previously BP-N-NNNN). The letters are written in white on a red license plate. The first two letters for private vehicles are BP This is followed by a digit signifying the region in which the vehicle is registered. Then a letter from A-Z is followed by four digits running in sequence like 1234. So for example a car registered in Thimphu could have the number BP-1-A1234.

=== Taxi ===
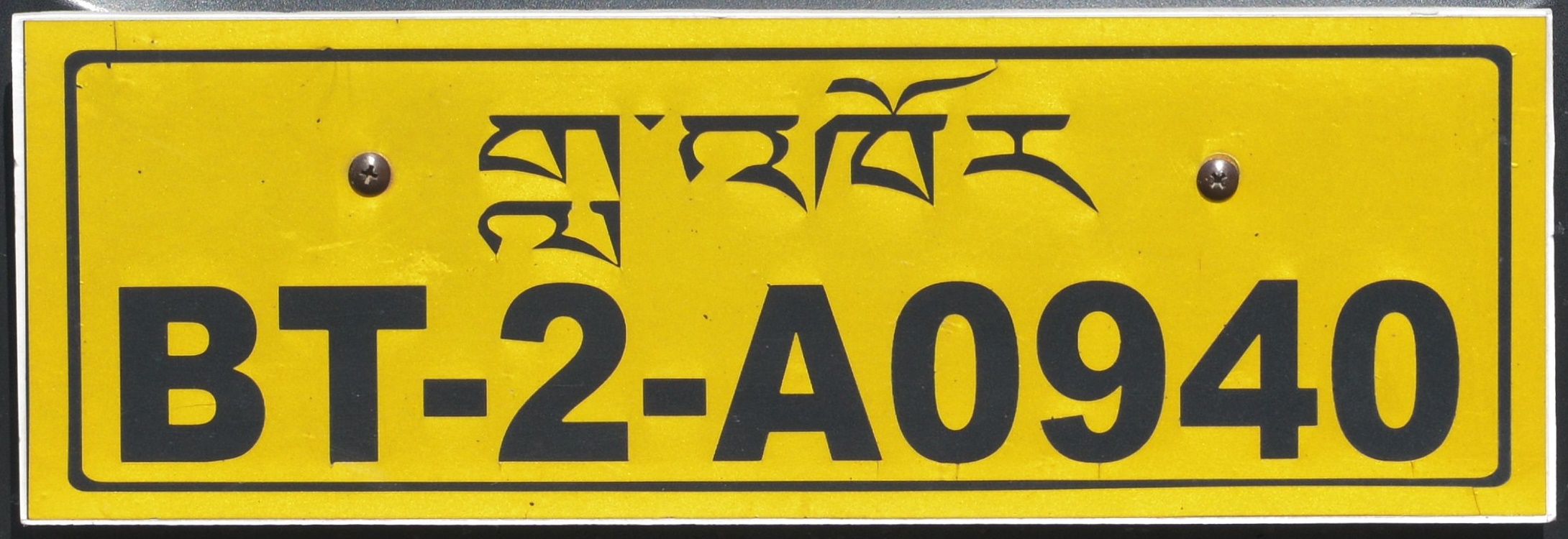

The current license plate for Taxi vehicles are written by black on yellow in very similar format to that or private vehicle except that the first two characters are BT. The regional digit remains the same.

=== Government vehicles ===
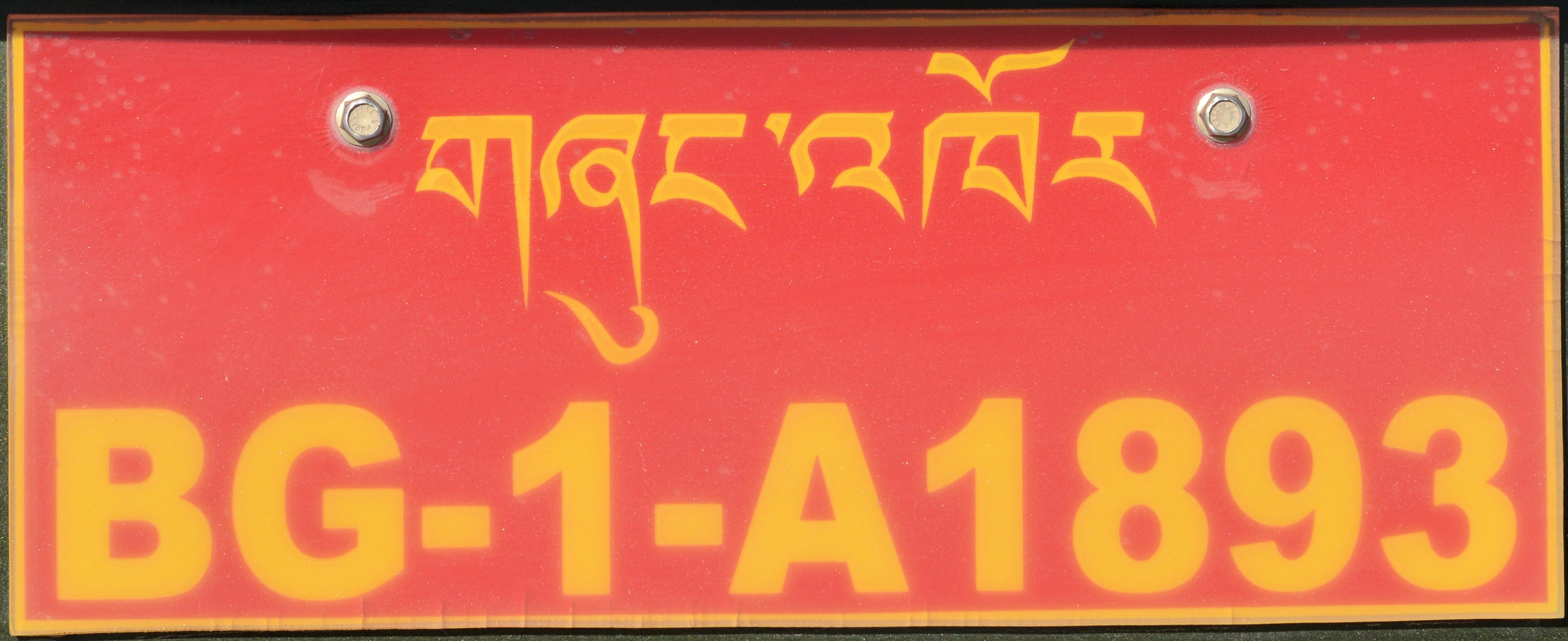

The Royal Government of Bhutan vehicles in Bhutan use a red license plate with the letters written in yellow. The first two characters of the plate are BG, followed by the same sequence as in case of private vehicles.

=== Police ===
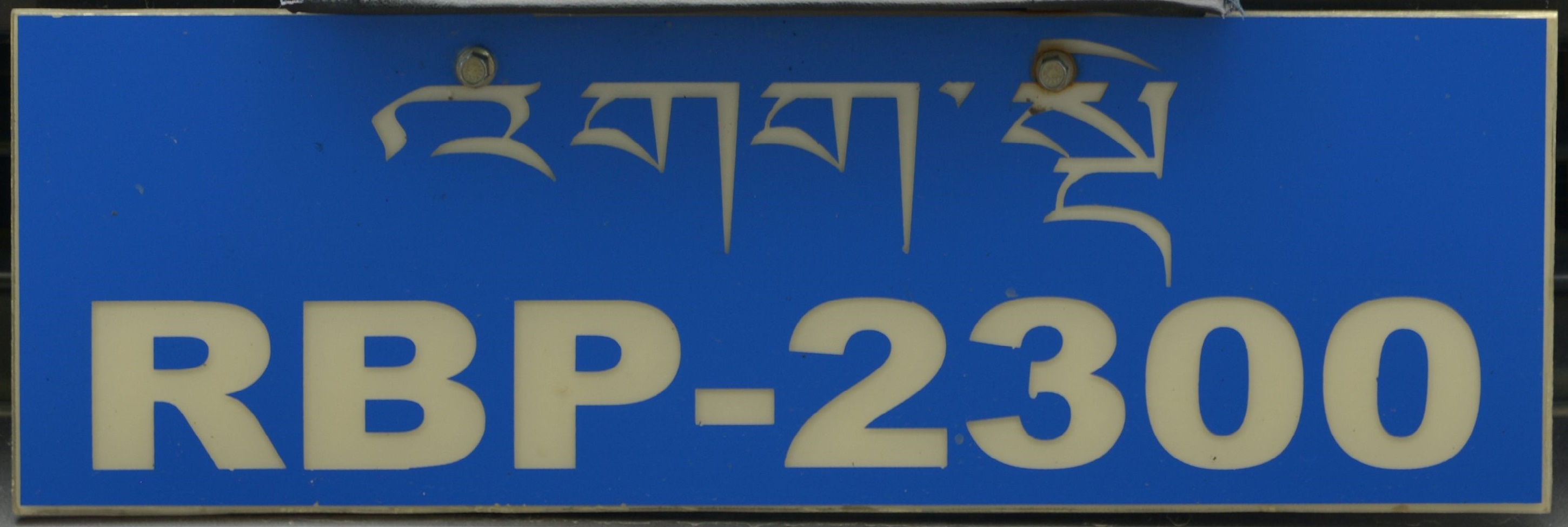

The Royal Bhutan Police vehicles in Bhutan use a blue license plate with the letters written in white. The first three characters of the plate are RBP, followed by four digits of vehicle number.

=== Royal Bodyguard vehicles ===
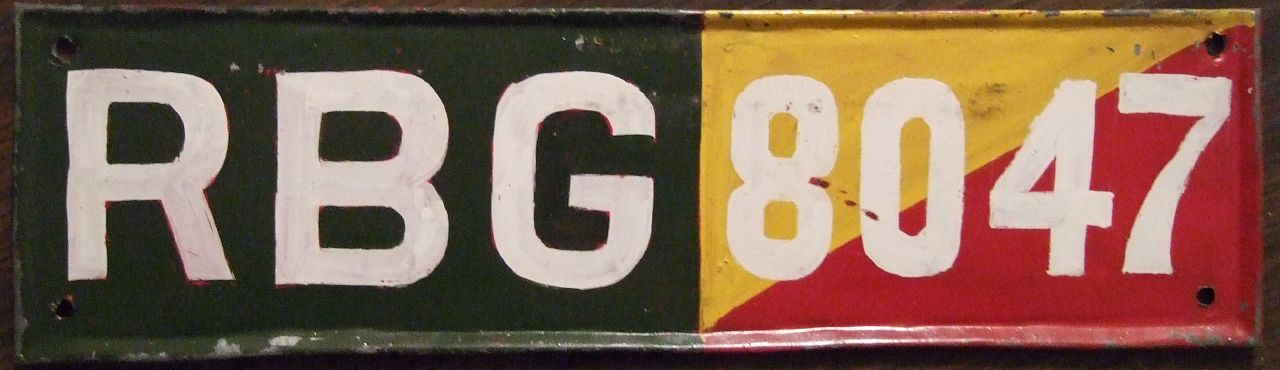

The Royal Bodyguard of Bhutan vehicles in Bhutan use different license plates with the letters written in white with black, orange and yellow background. The first three characters of the plate are RBG, followed by four digits of vehicle number.

=== Diplomatic ===
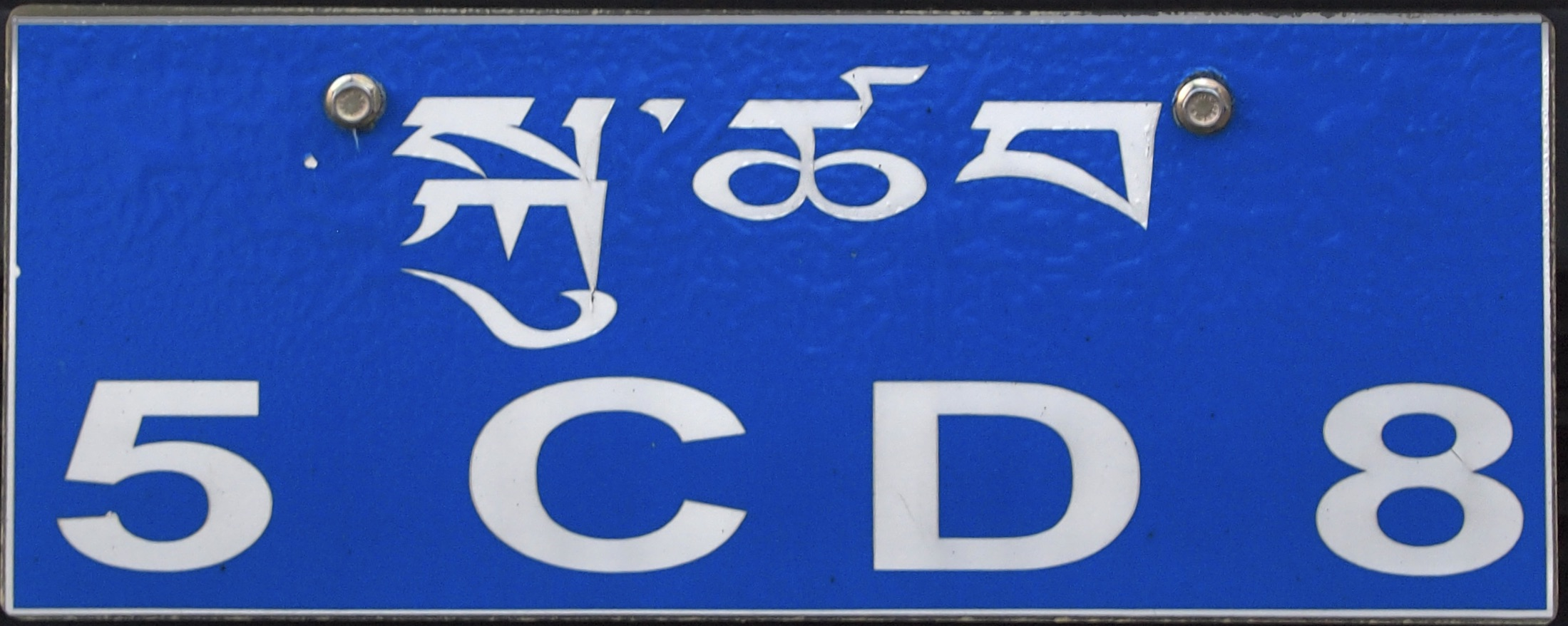

Vehicles used by those on diplomatic missions use white on blue plates, with the Dzonghka word for "Representative" at the top, and a number representing the country or organization to which the vehicle belongs, the letters CD, and a serial number.
