= Military ranks of Bhutan =

The Military ranks of Bhutan are the military insignia used by the Military of Bhutan. Bhutan is a landlocked country, and does therefore not possess a navy. Additionally, Bhutan does not have an air force. India is responsible for military training, arms supplies and the air defense of Bhutan.

== Commissioned officer ranks ==
The rank insignia of commissioned officers.

Rank group	General / flag officers			Senior officers			Junior officers
Royal Bhutan Army
Royal Bhutan Army	གུང་ བློན་ གོང མ ། Gung blon gong ma	གུང་ བློན་ འོག མ ། Gung blon 'og ma	མདོ་ འཛིན ། Mdo 'dzin	དམག་ སྲིད་ གོང མ ། Dmag srid gong ma	དམག་ སྲིད་ འོག མ ། Dmag srid 'og ma	ལིང་ དཔོན ། Ling dpon	སྤྱི་ དཔོན ། Spyi dpon	སྡེ་ གོང་ ། Sde gong
Royal Bhutan Army	Lieutenant general	Major general	Brigadier	Colonel	Lieutenant colonel	Major	Captain	Lieutenant

== Other ranks ==
The rank insignia of non-commissioned officers and enlisted personnel.

Rank group	Senior NCOs				Junior NCOs		Enlisted
Royal Bhutan Army							No insignia
Royal Bhutan Army	འགྲིམ་ དཔོན་ གོང མ ། Drimpongom	སྡེ་ འགྲིམ ། Dedrim	འགྲིམ་ དཔོན ། Drimpon	སྤེལ་ དཔོན ། Pelpon	སྤེལ་ རྒྱབ ། Peljab	འགོ་ པ ། Gopa
Royal Bhutan Army	Warrant officer 1st class	Warrant officer 2nd class	Warrant officer 3rd class	Sergeant	Corporal	Lance corporal	Private
