= Chief Operations Officer of the Royal Bhutan Army =

- རྒྱལ་པོའི་དམག་སྡེ་གི་ འགོ་འཛིན་འགོ་དཔོན། (Dzongkha)
- Flag of Royal Bhutan Army

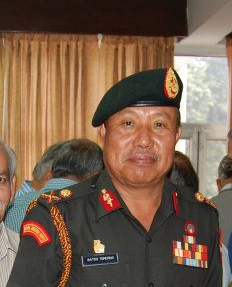
- Incumbent; Lieutenant General Batoo Tshering since 1 November 2005
- Royal Bhutan Army
- Reports to: The King; Prime Minister
- Seat: Thimphu
- Formation: 25 November 1964; 61 years ago
- First holder: Lam Dorji

The Chief Operations Officer of the Royal Bhutan Army (COO; Dzongkha: རྒྱལ་པོའི་དམག་སྡེ་གི་ འགོ་འཛིན་འགོ་དཔོན།, romanized: rgyal po'i dmag sde gi 'go 'dzin 'go dpon/) is the professional head of the Royal Bhutan Army. The position was established on 25 November 1964 at the army headquarters in Thimphu by the King Jigme Dorji Wangchuck. The purpose of the Chief Operations Officer is to assist the King of Bhutan (the supreme commander-in-chief of the armed forces) and the Prime Minister of Bhutan (the chief executive of the kingdom) in commanding the RBA. The current COO is Batoo Tshering.

== List of officeholders ==
No.	Portrait	Name (born–died)	Term of office			Ref.
No.	Portrait	Name (born–died)	Took office	Left office	Time in office	Ref.
1		Lieutenant General; Lam Dorji (1933–2020)	25 November 1964	1 November 2005	40 years, 341 days	
2		Lieutenant General; Batoo Tshering (born 1951)	1 November 2005	Incumbent	20 years, 344 days	

== See also ==
- Military of Bhutan
- Chief of Defence Staff (India)
- Chief of the Army Staff (Nepal)
