= Royal Bodyguard =

Royal Bodyguard may refer to:

- Royal Bodyguard of Bhutan
- The Royal Bodyguard, British television series (2011)

== See also ==
- Sovereign's Bodyguard
