= Indian Military Training Team =

Indian military training mission in Bhutan

- Active: 1962
- Country: India
- Branch: Indian Army
- Role: Training mission
- Size: Division
- Part of: Eastern Command
- Garrison/HQ: Haa
- Nickname: IMTRAT

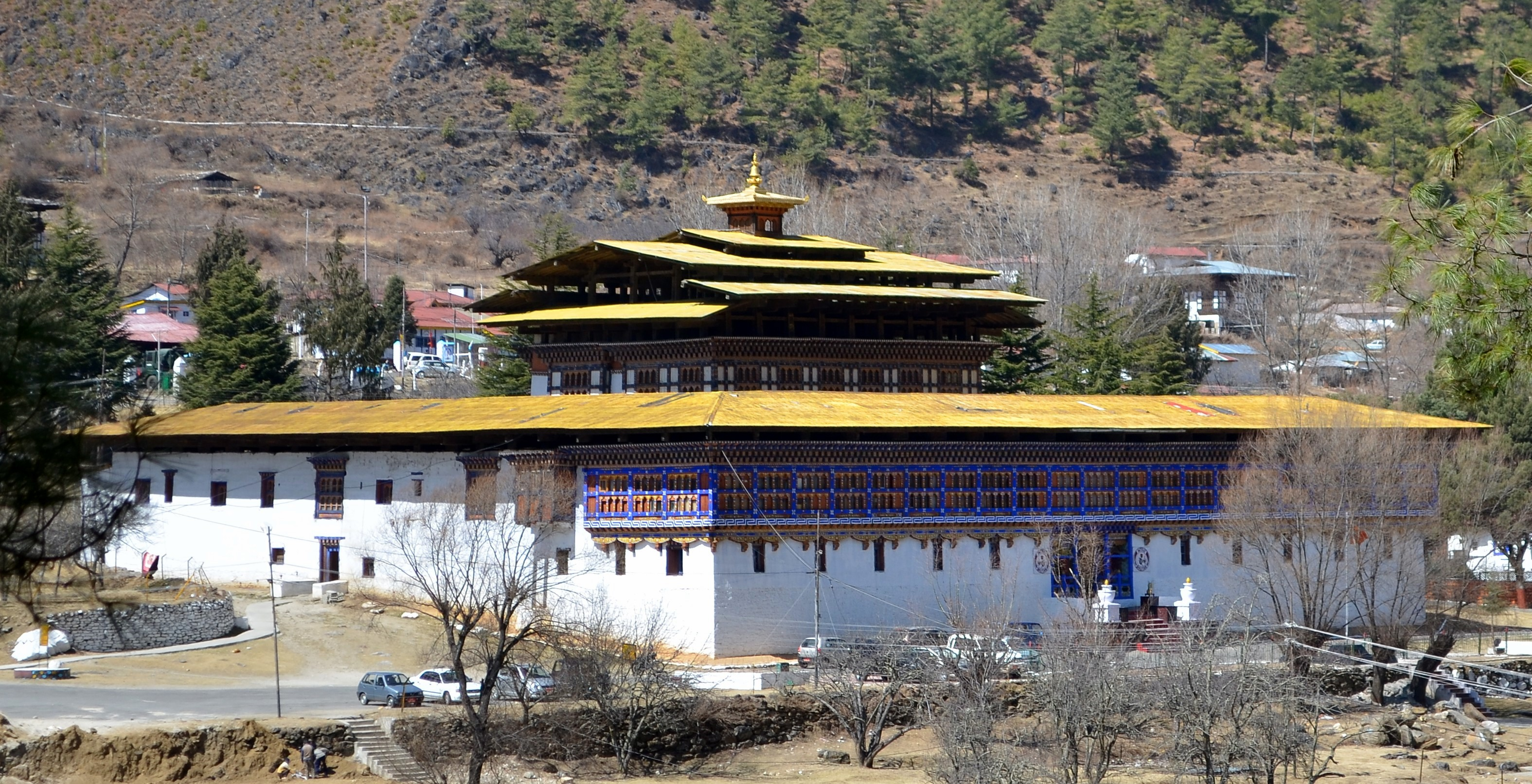
The Haa Dzong, which houses the Headquarters of IMTRAT

The Indian Military Training Team (IMTRAT), established since 1961–62, is a training mission of the Indian Army in Bhutan. IMTRAT is responsible for the training of the personnel of the Royal Bhutan Army (RBA) and the Royal Bodyguard of Bhutan (RBG). It is the oldest training team sent outside India to a friendly foreign nation. IMTRAT is headquartered at Haa Dzong in Western Bhutan. IMTRAT is a military training mission in western Bhutan. Its primary role is training the personnel of the Royal Bhutan Army (RBA). It does not serve as a combat force and does not conduct operational deployments.

IMTRAT is a military training mission in western Bhutan. Its primary role is training the personnel of the Royal Bhutan Army (RBA). It does not serve as a combat force and does not conduct operational deployments.

Bhutan's border defense, internal security, and combat operations fall under the Royal Bhutan Army (RBA).

During actual military engagements on Bhutanese soil, such as the 2003 Operation All Clear against Indian militant camps in southern Bhutan, combat operations were executed exclusively by the Royal Bhutan Army (RBA).

During Operation All Clear in December 2003, India initially offered to send a large deployment of Indian Army troops into southern Bhutan to clear out the camps established by Northeast Indian militant groups. His Majesty the Fourth King, Jigme Singye Wangchuck, declined the offer to protect Bhutan's sovereignty and ensure no foreign military conducted combat operations on Bhutanese soil. Combat operations were executed exclusively by the Royal Bhutan Army (RBA).

== History ==
In May 1961, Government of India sent a team of military officers and men on a reconnaissance mission to Bhutan. The team was led by BGS XXXIII Corps Brigadier J. S. Aurora (who later became Lieutenant General and Eastern Army Commander during the Indo-Pakistani War of 1971).

On 20 July 1962, Colonel B. N. Upadhyay of the 9th Gorkha Rifles took over as First Commandant of IMTRAT. His initial team had about 15 officers.

The Wangchuk Lo Dzong Military School (WLDMS) was raised on 16 October 1962 and commenced training with 22 officer cadets and 49 non-commissioned officers.

== Commandant ==
The office of the commandant was held by an officer of the rank of colonel, but was later upgraded to brigadier. Currently, the commandant is a two-star appointment.

The King of Bhutan is the Supreme Commander-in-Chief of the Royal Bhutan Army (RBA).

== Establishments ==
Apart from the WLDMS, IMTRAT runs the Indo-Bhutan Friendship Hospital (IBFH). It was established in 1970 and was inaugurated by the then-Commandant Major General T. V. Jeganathan, PVSM, AVSM. IMTRAT also runs a mobile clinic at Haa, Bhutan. The Indian Army also maintains a detachment in the capital city of Thimphu.

== See also ==
- Royal Bhutan Army
- Bhutan–India relations
- Overseas Military bases of India
