= Order of the Wheel of the Thunder Dragon =

Order of the Wheel of the Thunder Dragon (Druk Khorlo)

Awarded by Bhutan
- Type: Order
- Awarded for: distinguished services to Bhutanese nation or people
- Status: Currently constituted
- Sovereign: Jigme Khesar Namgyel Wangchuck

Precedence
- Next (higher): Royal Order of Bhutan
- Next (lower): National Order of Merit
- Ribbon bar of the order

The Order of Wheel of the Thunder Dragon (Dzongkha : Druk Khorlo) is a Single Class Order ranking fourth in the Order of Precedence. It was instituted by King Jigme Dorji Wangchuck on 9 February 1967 and reorganized by King Jigme Khesar Namgyel Wangchuck in January 2008 and consists of a neck Badge and a matching miniature.

== Insignia ==
The 65 mm badge, comprises a back plate of dorjee the point of which form an outer circle, within which a black enamelled circle encloses the King's portrait in gold, on a background of enameled yellow and orange of the Bhutanese National Flag.

The ribbon is blue with orange and yellow stripes on the edges.
