= Karma Rigzin =

Bhutanese UN peacekeeper and police officer

Lieutenant Colonel Karma Rigzin is a former UN peacekeeper, one of the three most senior ranking women in Royal Bhutan Police, and founder of its Woman and Child Protection Division. She was recognized by the US State Department in 2020 for her work to stop human trafficking.

== Career ==
Rigzin studied Political Science at Delhi University, intending to become a lawyer, but instead joined Royal Bhutan Police in 2000. In 2006 she started a special unit for protection of women and children. In 2007, her team identified and prosecuted Bhutan's first criminal case involving human trafficking charges. In 2017, she worked with UN peacekeeping forces in Sudan. Colonel Rigzin has trained immigration officials, senior police officers, and non-commissioned officers on identification of trafficking victims and investigation techniques and has successfully advocated for increased funding for trafficking victim services.

In June 2020 the US State Department named her as one of their 10 "heroes" for working to combat Trafficking in Persons (TIP). In a ceremony at the White House, John Richmond, from the Office to Monitor and Combat Trafficking in Persons said the award was given: "In recognition of her extraordinary leadership in pioneering Bhutan's victim-centered specialized national police unit on women and children that led to the first-ever criminal human trafficking case, and her pivotal role in significantly increasing anti-trafficking efforts across all departments of the government".

When interviewed about her career as a police officer, Rigzin said: "You read in your Dzongkha textbook that life is impermanent and all that but you don't realize this until you see dead bodies, and I think the result is you become a better human being because you are more in contact with reality."
