= Batoo Tshering =

Bhutanese major general (born 1951)

Goongleon B. Tshering
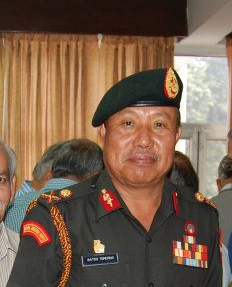
- Batoo Tshering.
- Born: December 11, 1951 (age 74); Toebesa, Thimphu, Bhutan
- Allegiance: Bhutan
- Branch: Royal Bhutan Army
- Service years: 1971 – Present
- Rank: Lieutenant General
- Conflicts: Operation All Clear
- Awards: Druk Yugyel Medal; Drakpoi Rinchen Tsugtor Medal; Drakpoi Wangyel Medal; Drakpoi Thugsey Medal; Drakpoi Khorlo Medal

Batoo Tshering is the current Chief Operations Officer of the Royal Bhutan Army (COO). He succeeded the outgoing chief, Goongloen Gongma Lam Dorji on 1 November 2005.

== Family ==
Tshering is married to Aum Pema Choden, who is a graduate of Paro College of Education and they have two daughters, Dechen Yangden & Rinchen Pelden, both of whom are employed with the Royal Government of Bhutan.

== Military career ==
Tshering underwent training at Indian Military Academy and was commissioned into the Royal Bhutan Army in November 1971. Thereafter, he was attached with the 8th Battalion the BIHAR Regiment of the Indian Army and underwent Young Officers Course, Commando Course, Intelligence Staff Officers’ Course, Junior Command Course, Senior Command Course in various schools of instruction in India. He is also a graduate of the prestigious Defense Services Staff College, Wellington, Tamil Nadu.

Lt Gen Batoo Tshering has held various important staff and command assignments. His first staff posting was at the Army Headquarters (AHQ) as operations and training officer in 1976. He commanded Wing 4 and Wing 7 in succession. He was the Commandant of Military Training Centre in 1988, Deputy Chief Operations Officer (G) in 1991 and Commander of Command Centre at Dewathang in 1997 till the completion of Operation: All Clear in 2003. He took over as the Deputy Chief Operations Officer with effect from 21 February 2005 and was appointed as the Chief Operations Officer by His Majesty King Jigme Singye Wangchuck on 1 November 2005. In addition to his responsibilities as the Chief Operations Officer, he is also the chairman of the Board of Directors of the Army Welfare Project.

While on active duty Tshering survived an ambush from armed insurgents near Nganglam on Oct 31, 1998, during which his car was riddled with bullet shots and he was injured.

== Awards and decorations ==
For his dedicated and distinguished service to the Tsa-Wa-Sum (King, Country and People), he was awarded Druk Yugyel (DYG), Drakpoi Wangyel (DW), Drakpoi Thugsey (DT) and Drakpoi Khorlo (DK) medals by His Majesty King Jigme Singye Wangchuck. He was also awarded the Drakpoi Rinchen Tsugtor (DRT) medal by His Majesty the King on 21 February 2013.
