= Ha, Bhutan =

Ha ཧཱ / ཧས Haa
- Location in Bhutan
- Coordinates: 27°22′57″N 89°17′06″E
- Country: Bhutan
- District: Haa District
- Time zone: UTC+6 (BTT.00)

Ha, also known as Haa or Has, is a Thromde or town, and the seat of Haa District in Bhutan.

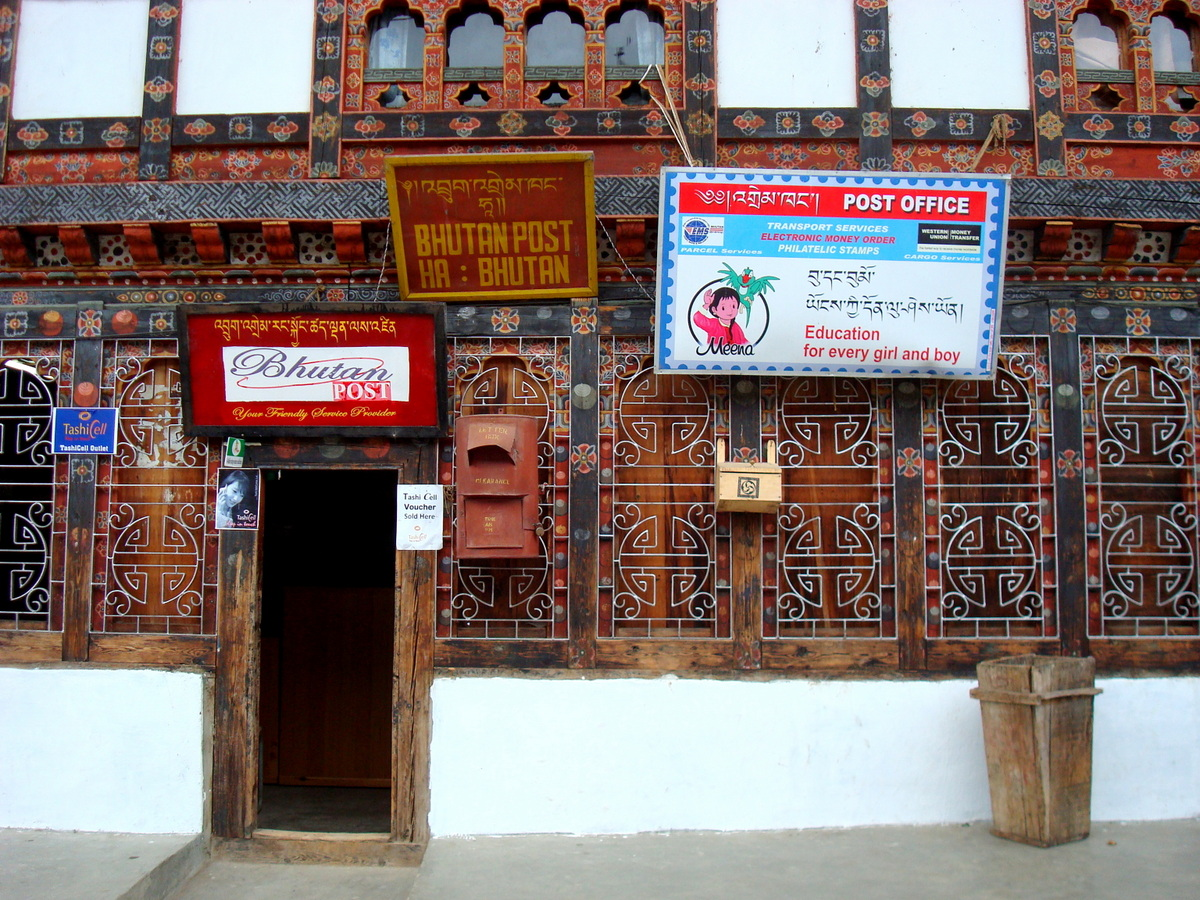
Post Office in Ha, Bhutan

Ha is situated in Haa Valley in the west of Bhutan bordering Sikkim. The major economic activity is rice production, yak herding and trade with neighbouring China. Ha accommodates The Indian Military Training Team (also known as IMTRAT). IMTRAT is responsible for the training of the personnel of the Royal Bhutan Army (RBA) and the Royal Bodyguard of Bhutan (RBG). It is the oldest training team sent outside India to a friendly-foreign nation. The place has a religious significance as Lhakhang Karpo and other monasteries are situated there.

== Climate ==
Climate data for Haa-Namjayling, elevation 2,720 m (8,920 ft), (1991–2017 normals)
| Month | Jan | Feb | Mar | Apr | May | Jun | Jul | Aug | Sep | Oct | Nov | Dec | Year |
|---|---|---|---|---|---|---|---|---|---|---|---|---|---|
| Record high °C (°F) | 22.0 (71.6) | 20.5 (68.9) | 25.0 (77.0) | 24.0 (75.2) | 26.5 (79.7) | 26.5 (79.7) | 28.5 (83.3) | 29.5 (85.1) | 26.5 (79.7) | 25.0 (77.0) | 22.0 (71.6) | 22.5 (72.5) | 29.5 (85.1) |
| Mean daily maximum °C (°F) | 10.5 (50.9) | 11.2 (52.2) | 13.5 (56.3) | 15.7 (60.3) | 18.2 (64.8) | 20.5 (68.9) | 20.8 (69.4) | 20.7 (69.3) | 19.2 (66.6) | 16.9 (62.4) | 14.4 (57.9) | 12.3 (54.1) | 16.2 (61.1) |
| Daily mean °C (°F) | 2.6 (36.7) | 4.1 (39.4) | 7.2 (45.0) | 10.2 (50.4) | 13.5 (56.3) | 16.5 (61.7) | 17.5 (63.5) | 17.1 (62.8) | 15.4 (59.7) | 11.2 (52.2) | 7.1 (44.8) | 4.3 (39.7) | 10.6 (51.0) |
| Mean daily minimum °C (°F) | −5.4 (22.3) | −3.0 (26.6) | 0.8 (33.4) | 4.7 (40.5) | 8.7 (47.7) | 12.5 (54.5) | 14.1 (57.4) | 13.5 (56.3) | 11.6 (52.9) | 5.4 (41.7) | −0.2 (31.6) | −3.7 (25.3) | 4.9 (40.9) |
| Record low °C (°F) | −14.5 (5.9) | −12.0 (10.4) | −7.0 (19.4) | −5.0 (23.0) | 0.5 (32.9) | 5.5 (41.9) | 6.5 (43.7) | 7.0 (44.6) | 1.5 (34.7) | −5.5 (22.1) | −8.0 (17.6) | −11.5 (11.3) | −14.5 (5.9) |
| Average rainfall mm (inches) | 10.8 (0.43) | 17.0 (0.67) | 34.8 (1.37) | 63.5 (2.50) | 72.3 (2.85) | 128.2 (5.05) | 185.8 (7.31) | 173.5 (6.83) | 129.4 (5.09) | 60.2 (2.37) | 2.9 (0.11) | 5.5 (0.22) | 883.9 (34.8) |
| Average relative humidity (%) | 71.4 | 68.1 | 63.8 | 65.3 | 68.4 | 74.4 | 78.8 | 78.9 | 76.9 | 71.5 | 61.2 | 66.0 | 70.4 |
Source: National Center for Hydrology and Meteorology

== See also ==
- Geography of Bhutan
- Transport in Bhutan
