= Operation All Clear =

2003–04 Bhutanese anti-separatist operation

- Part of Insurgency in Northeast India
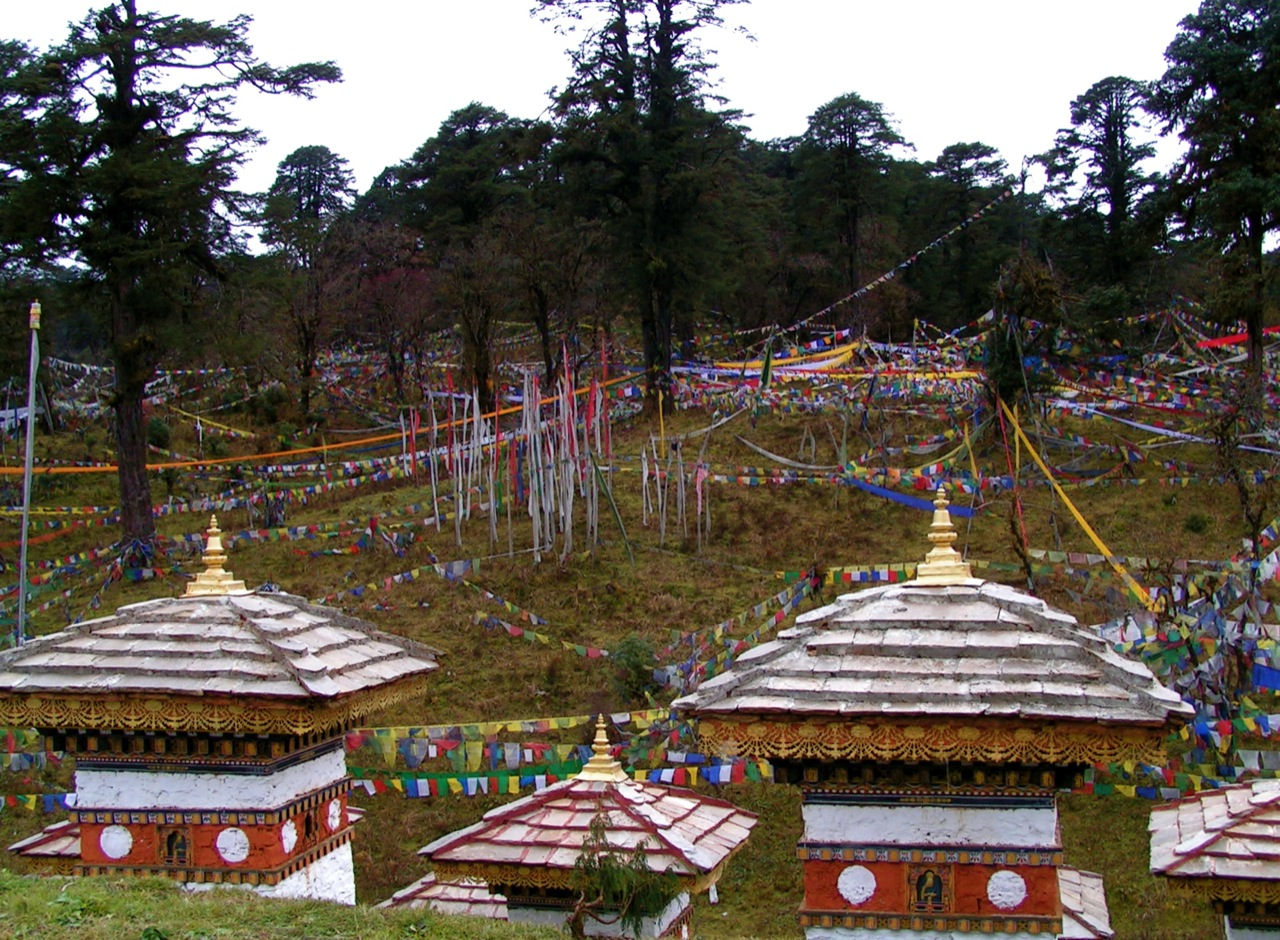
- A part of the 108 chörten built on the Dochu-La pass, to commemorate the operation
Date	15 December 2003 – 3 January 2004 (2 weeks and 5 days)
Location	Southern Bhutan: Samtse District; Samdrup Jongkhar District; Sarpang District; Zhemgang District
Result	Bhutanese victory: Destruction of rebel encampments.; Expulsion of the remaining rebels.

Belligerents
Bhutan; Royal Bhutan Army; Royal Bodyguard of Bhutan; Royal Bhutan Police; Bhutanese Militia; Supported by: India	ULFA; NDFB; KLO

Commanders and leaders
(Bhutan) Jigme Singye Wangchuck (Bhutan) Jigme Khesar Namgyel Wangchuck (Bhutan) Jigme Thinley (Bhutan) Lam Dorji (Bhutan) Batoo Tshering (India) Nirmal Chander Vij	Arabinda Rajkhowa; Bhimkanta Buragohain (POW); Mithinga Daimary (POW); Ranjan Daimary; Milton Burman (POW); Tom Adhikary (POW); Harshabardhan Barman (POW); Rahul Datta †

Strength
5,000 RBA; 634 Bhutanese Militia	1,500–3,500

Casualties and losses
(Bhutan) 16 killed 35–60 wounded (India) Disputed	160 killed 490 captured Insurgents claim: 24 killed

Operation All Clear was a military operation conducted by the Royal Bhutan Army against Assam-based separatist insurgent groups in the southern regions of Bhutan between 15 December 2003 and 3 January 2004. It was the first ever operation conducted by the Royal Bhutan Army.

== Background ==
In 1990, India launched Operations Rhino and Bajrang against Assam separatist groups. Facing continuous pressure, Assamese militants relocated their camps to Bhutan.

In 1996, the Bhutan government became aware of a large number of camps on its southern border with India. The camps were set up by four Assamese separatist movements: the ULFA, NDFB, Bodo Liberation Tigers Force (BLTF) and Kamtapur Liberation Organization (KLO). The camps also harbored separatists belonging to the National Socialist Council of Nagaland (NSCN) and All Tripura Tiger Force (ATTF).

The camps had been established with the goal of training cadres and storing equipment, while the thick jungles of the region also enabled the militants to easily launch attacks into Indian territory.

India then exerted diplomatic pressure on Bhutan, offering support in removing the rebel organisations from its soil. The government of Bhutan initially pursued a peaceful solution, opening dialogue with the militant groups on 1998. Five rounds of talks were held with ULFA, three rounds with NDFB, with KLO ignoring all invitations sent by the government. In June 2001 ULFA agreed to close down four of its camps; however, the Bhutanese government soon realized that the camps had simply been relocated.

KLO had also been allegedly involved in creating the Bhutan Tiger Force, the military wing of the Communist Party of Bhutan (Marxist–Leninist–Maoist), together with Nepalese Maoists. Additionally, the KLO, along with ULFA and NDFB, were allegedly involved in forming another militant outfit, the Bhutan Gorkha Liberation Front, made up of ethnic Nepalese immigrants and refugees from southern Bhutan. This strengthened the Bhutanese government's resolve to launch the operation.

On 19 July 2003, a group of Bhutanese parliamentarians proposed to raise the number of Bhutanese militia, by introducing a Swiss-style militia training for all citizens aged between 18 and 50. The motion was dismissed by foreign minister Jigme Thinley and Brigadier General Batoo Tshering, who asserted that 5,000 Royal Bhutan Army soldiers have been deployed to the country's border with India.

On 3 August 2003, more than 15 gunmen attacked an ULFA base in Kinzo, 22 kilometers from Samdrup Jongkhar, leaving two ULFA members dead. The attackers fled after the rebels returned fire. The following day, a group of between 10 and 12 gunmen attacked ULFA members residing in an abandoned house in Babang. Four gunmen and one ULFA fighter perished in the encounter. In response, a ULFA spokeswoman blamed the attacks on mercenaries and SULFA fighters hired by the Indian government. Indian officials called the attacks rebel infighting.

During the course of 2003, Bhutan reestablished its militia force. By 15 September 2003, the Bhutanese militia consisted of 634 volunteers. The militia volunteers were deployed in the southern regions of the country, after undergoing a two-month training. Bhutan's militia played a supporting role during the conflict.

By 2003 the talks had failed to produce any significant result. On 14 July 2003, military intervention was approved by the National Assembly. On 13 December 2003, the Bhutanese government issued a two-day ultimatum to the rebels. On 15 December 2003, after the ultimatum had expired, Operation All Clear – the first operation ever conducted by the Royal Bhutan Army – was launched.

== Operation ==
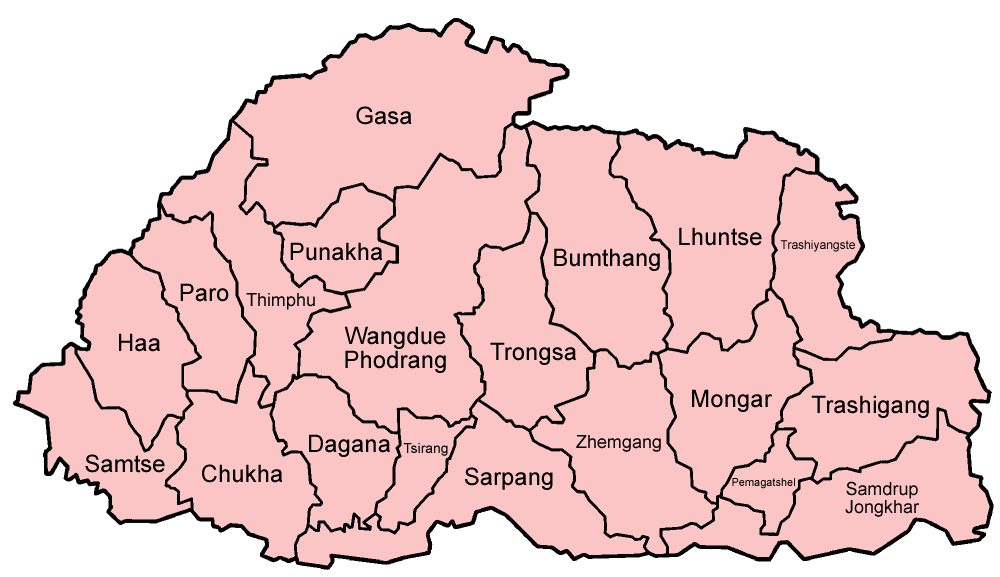
A map of Bhutan.

- 14 December 2003: According to two separate testimonies made by ULFA commanders, a Royal Bhutan Army major visited an ULFA encampment claiming that Bhutan's king was planning to make a friendly visit on the next day. Having received the king on numerous occasions previously, the operation that followed the next day came as a complete surprise to the militants.
- 15 December 2003: The Royal Bhutan Army inflicted heavy casualties on the rebels; among the dead was ULFA commander Rahul Datta. A total of 90 rebels surrendered. The army seized ULFA's central command headquarters located at Phukatong in Samdrup Jongkhar.
- 16 December 2003: The Indian Army deployed 12 battalions along the border with Bhutan to prevent rebel infiltration. India also provided helicopters in order to assist the Royal Bhutan Army troops with evacuating the injured. Clashes occurred in Kalikhola, Tintala and Bukka. Ten rebel camps were destroyed by the end of the day.
- 18 December 2003: A group of ULFA rebels surrendered themselves at Buddha Vihar, after hiding in the jungle for three days.
- 20 December 2003: Five days after the launch of operations, militants were dislodged from all 30 camps, with the camps burned and razed to the ground. Meanwhile, the army troops continued their efforts to combat resistance pockets in the dense forests of the southern districts.
- 25 December 2003: Five captured top ranking militants, including KLO vice-chairman Harshabardhan Barman, were transferred to Tezpur, India by an Indian Army helicopter.
- By 25 December 2003, the Royal Bhutan Army had killed about 120 militants. They managed to capture several senior ULFA commanders. Large numbers of rebels fled to Bangladesh and India.
- By 27 December 2003, RBA confiscated 500 AK 47/56 assault rifles and a huge quantity of other weapons, including rocket launchers, mortars and communication equipment, along with more than 100,000 rounds of ammunition. An anti-aircraft gun was also found inside the ULFA headquarters. The captured rebels and civilians along with seized weapons and ammunition were handed over to the government of India.
- 30 December 2003: An ULFA camp in Goburkonda was captured, after previously being subjected to mortar fire. A generator, 20 tonnes of rice and television sets were among the confiscated items.
- By 3 January 2004, RBA had destroyed 35 additional rebel observation posts.

== Aftermath ==
In a follow-up action to the operation, 22 Bhutanese civilians were found guilty of aiding the separatists with charges ranging from supplying the militants with food to providing services in exchange for money. Another 123 Bhutanese citizens were facing trial on similar charges as of July 2004.

Between 2008 and 2011, Royal Bhutan Police and Royal Bhutan Army personnel undertook numerous actions against unidentified militants. Several firefights occurred while Bhutan military personnel were required to dispose of several explosive devices and destroyed a number of guerrilla camps.

The incidents that took place during the period include:

- In 2010, a Royal Bhutan Army soldier was killed in the area of Gabrukanda. NDFB rebels allegedly were involved in the killing.
- 1 August 2010: Security forces uncovered five new NDFB camps within Bhutan.
- 12 October 2010: Two RBA soldiers were injured by bombs planted by NDFB.
- 20 February 2011: At least four Royal Bhutan Police personnel were injured after being ambushed by a group of 15 to 20 militants wearing camouflage in the Sarpang region of Bhutan. NDFB rebels were suspected of being behind the attack. A NDFB spokesman appealed for the release of information regarding the disappearance of several NDFB leaders during Operation All Clear, while denying any involvement in the attack.
