= Royal Order of Bhutan =

Royal Order of Bhutan (Druk Thuksey)

Awarded by Bhutan
- Type: Order
- Established: 1966
- Awarded for: distinguished services to Bhutanese nation or people
- Status: Currently constituted
- Founder: Jigme Dorji Wangchuck
- Sovereign: Jigme Khesar Namgyel Wangchuck

Precedence
- Next (higher): Order of Great Victory of the Thunder Dragon
- Next (lower): Order of the Wheel of the Thunder Dragon
- Ribbon bar of the order

The Royal Order of Bhutan (Dzongkha: Druk Thuksey / Druk Thugsey, meaning "Heart Son of the Thunder Dragon") is a medal awarded by the King of Bhutan. It was established by Jigme Dorji Wangchuck in 1966 and redesigned in 2008.

== Award ==
It is awarded to people who had contributed in a variety of ways to the socio-economic, religious and political development and growth of Bhutan.

It can be presented to both Bhutanese citizens and foreign nationals.

=== Insignia ===
This order consists of a single class consisting of a neck badge suspended by a collar and matching miniature contained in a fitted case featuring the “cross dorjee and the name of the order in gold block on the lid.

The 65 mm badge consists of a large outer ring with silver crossed dorjees and eight gold lotus petals placed in between, with a red enameled circle within, inside which a yellow enamel bears a golden portrait of the King.

== Notable recipients ==
- William Mackey (1973).
- Lyonpo Jigme Yoser Thinley, Former Prime Minister of Bhutan (2 June 1999).
- Dasho Dr. Lotay Tshering, Former Prime Minister of Bhutan
- Pawo Choyning Dorji in recognition of his services to the nation through his outstanding contribution to Bhutanese film. Dorji is the youngest recipient of the Druk Thuksey in the history of Bhutan.
- Ministry of Health, Royal Government of Bhutan
- Royal Bhutan Airline (Drukair)
- Lopen Nyapchi aka lopen Thinley Gyeltshen for life-time service to four generations of kings the and the country (the man who named the border towns of Bhutan Gelephu, Phuntsholing, Samdrupjongkhar and Dradhul Makhang in Thimphu) (awarded on 17 Dec 2015)
- Drungtsho Sherub Jordan credited for his contributions in instituting the Traditional medicine school in Bhutan and ensuring the tradition do not disappear (awarded on 17 Dec 2015)
- Dr. Arthit Ourairat, president of Rangsit University, Thailand for being a long-standing true friend of Bhutan(awarded on 17 Dec 2015)
- Yanglop Drep BasoKarp for being an examplery member of the clergy (awarded on 17 Dec 2015)
- Tsukla lopen Sangay Dorji
- Arvind kumar Mishra (Managing Director of Mangdechu Hydro project awarded on 2023 December 17)
- Bhutan Emergency Aeromedical Retrieval (BEAR) Team (2021)

Druk Namyrup Tshogpa( Political party of Bhutan and 2018-2024 ruling Government. Awarded on 2023 December 17

- Col. Lam Dorji, COO of the Royal Bhutan Army on 24 June 1969 by the Third Druk Gyalpo Jigme Dorji Wangchuck. Col Lam Dorji was 35 years old at the time making him the youngest known recipient of the award
- Goongloen Lam Dorji on 17 December 2010 by The Fifth Druk Gyalpo Jigme Khesar Namgyel Wangchuck
