= Intelligence and Investigation Division =

Secret police of Bhutan

Intelligence and Investigation Division of the Royal Bhutan Police is the sole intelligence agency of Bhutan. It has one unit for both investigation and intelligence. The other unit is for administration and accounts. In April 2019, intelligence-led policing was integrated into traditional policing by Royal Bhutan Police. Anti Corruption Commission of Bhutan undertakes or used to have an intelligence (2022). A commissioner controls its investigations division and its legal division. Investigations division is/was divided into intelligence section and investigations section.
