= Lam Dorji =

Bhutanese military officer (1933–2020)

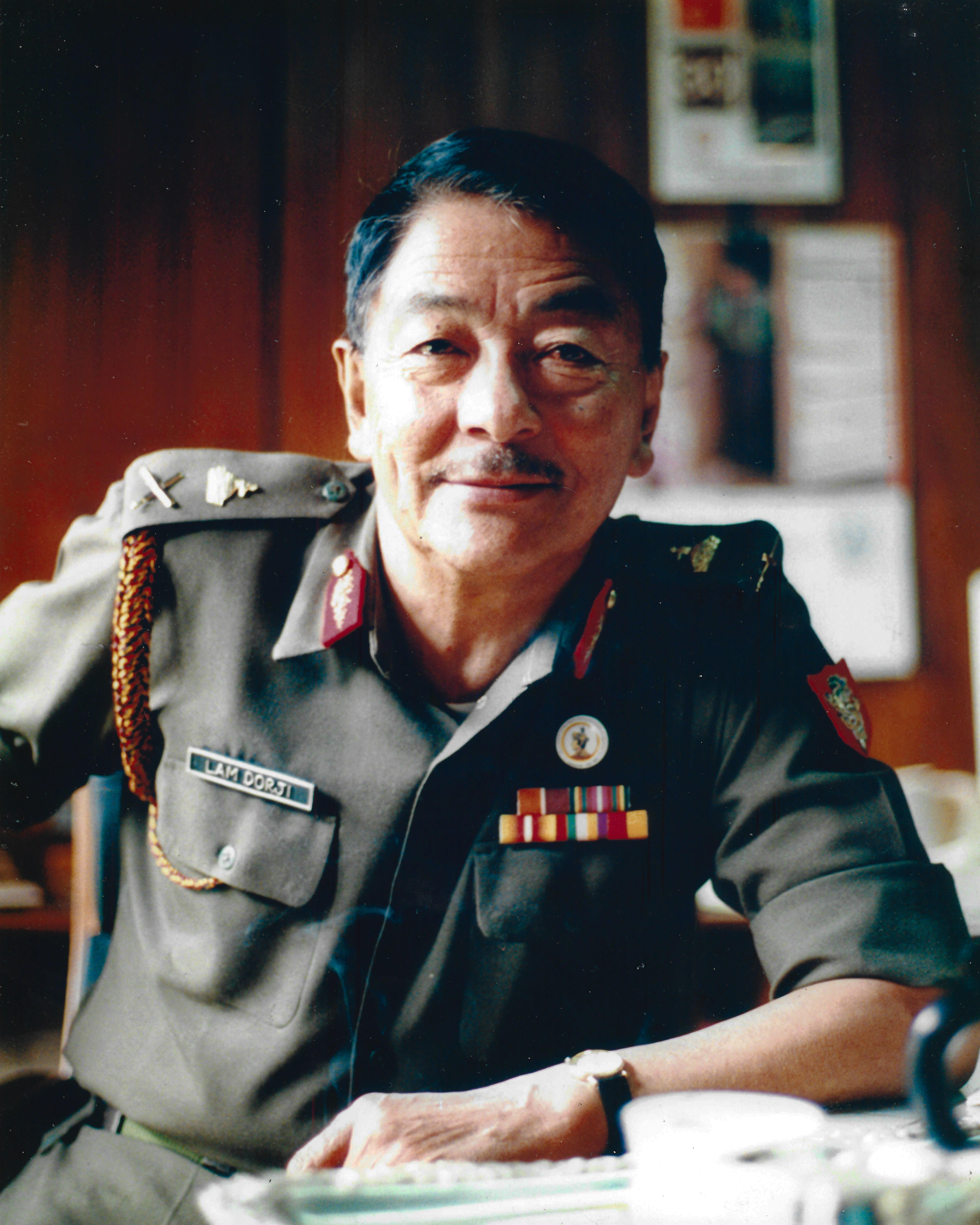
Goongloen Lam Dorji

Lam Dorji (23 October 1933 – 27 April 2020) was the Chief Operations Officer (COO) of the Royal Bhutan Army (RBA) from 1964 to 2005. He was succeeded by Batoo Tshering on 1 November 2005.

== Military career ==
Lam Dorji was born in Haa. He graduated from the Indian Military Academy in Dehradun, India, at the end of 1954, and completed a post-training attachment with a range of Indian Army units and instructional schools. In March 1959, he received his first assignment, to establish the RBA training center in Wangduephodrang. He also represented the Armed Forces at the National Assembly. In 1962, during the Indo-China war, he was posted in Lingmithang to oversee the training of a military force drawn from Kurtoe, Bumthang, Mongar, and Shumar (now Pema Gatshel). He was promoted to the rank of Maktsi wogma [Lieutenant Colonel] on 7 August 1962, and served as the Commandant of the Training Center from 1963 to 1964. On 25 November 1964, he was appointed as the Chief Operations Officer at the army headquarters in Thimphu by the King Jigme Dorji Wangchuck, who promoted him to Maktsi (Full Colonel) in 1970, and promoted him to the rank of Goongloen Wogma (Major General) in June 1981. He was further promoted as Goongloen Gongma (Lt. General) on August 2, 1991.

== Other activities ==
As General Secretary of the National Sports Association of Bhutan, from 1974 to 1978, he worked directly under King Jigme Singye Wangchuck to develop the Changlimithang Stadium and the Royal Thimphu Golf Club. In 1979, under the command of King Jigme Singye Wangchuck, the RBA built the 21-kilometre Laptsakha irrigation channel in Punakha at a fraction of the estimated cost, enabling the resettlement of over 200 landless pensioners and bringing into cultivation over 1,200 acres of land. In 1981, he was appointed Chairman of the Government Welfare Project, now known as the Army Welfare Project (AWP), a project conceived and launched by the king to generate funds for the welfare of servicemen and to provide employment for retired personnel. Aimed at being a sustainable commercial venture that proved to be an example to other government ventures and corporations, AWP now earns more than Nu. 200 million a year.

In 1983 he was assigned command and control of the Royal Bhutan Police by the king to reorganise and streamline the service conditions and improve the morale of the RBP. During the Ngolop uprising of 1990, the RBA safeguarded the security of the nation at a time when the southern Dzongkhags saw unprecedented violence. Under the personal leadership of King Jigme Singye Wangchuck, the RBA rose to the challenge of flushing out the Indian militants who were illegally camped on Bhutanese soil in 2003.

During his 41 years as Chief Operations Officer, he developed a close rapport with 15 Chiefs of Army Staff of the Indian Army. Generals and senior officers of the Indian army expressed their deep appreciation over the years for the outstanding contributions made by General Lam Dorji in enhancing the close friendship and cooperation between the Indian army and the Royal Bhutan Army, thereby contributing to the strengthening of Indo-Bhutan relations. As the Chief Operations Officer, Lam Dorji accompanied the king to the summits of the Non Aligned Movement and SAARC as well as the king's public meetings around the country.

He died on 27 April 2020.

== Awards and decorations ==
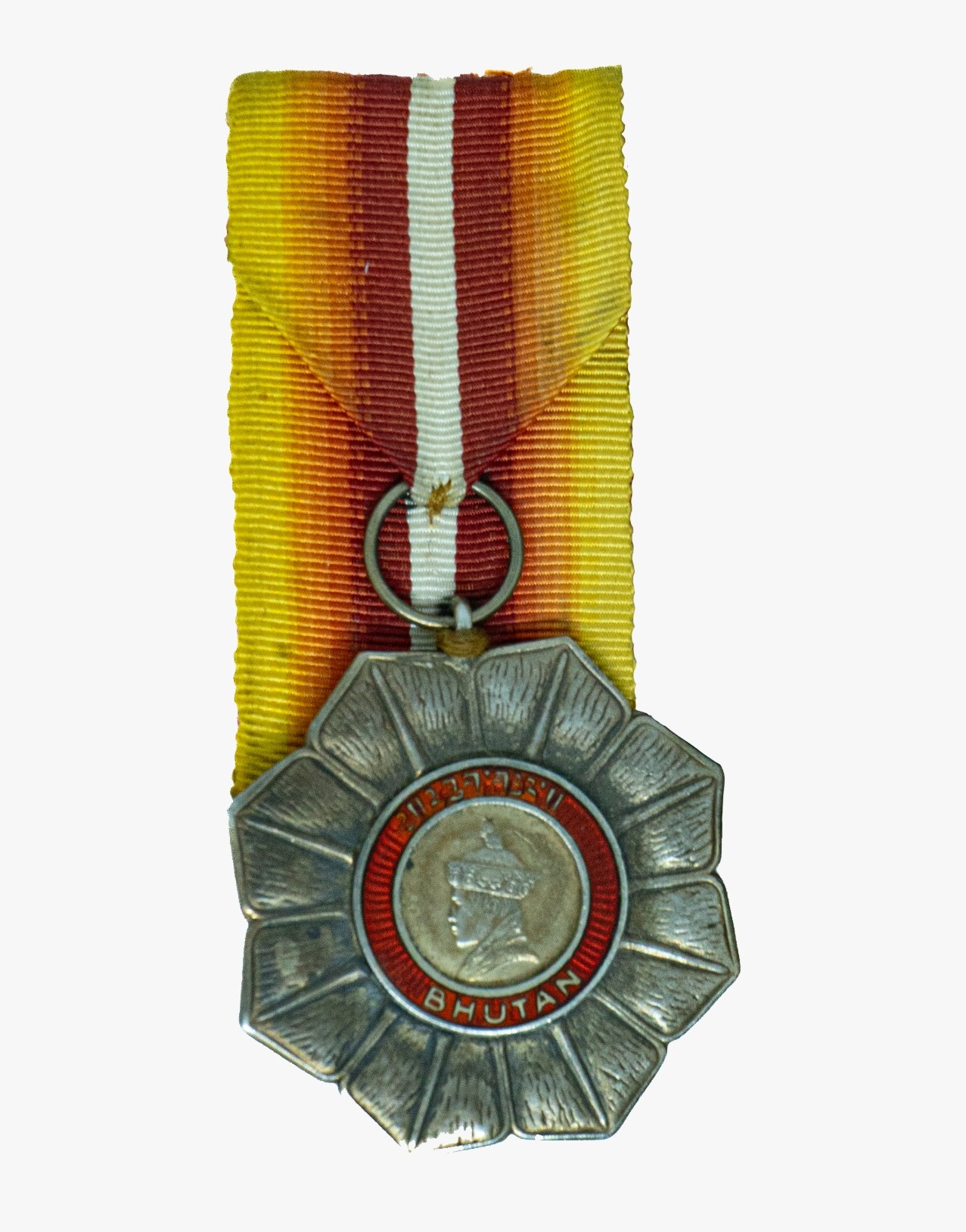
Lam Dorji's Druk Thuksey awarded in 1969

For dedicated and distinguished service to the Tsa-Wa-Sum (King, Country and People), Lam Dorji was awarded the Royal Order of Bhutan Druk Thuksey medal on 24 June 1969, by King Jigme Dorji Wangchuck. In 1991 King Jigme Singye Wangchuck awarded him the highest medal of the Royal Bhutan Army, the Druk Yugyel (DYG). In recognition of his long and dedicated service to the Tsawa-Sum he was awarded the Drakpoi Wangyel medal (DW) by the king on 17 December 2001. Lam Dorji was awarded the Royal Order of Bhutan Druk Thuksey by the Fifth King of Bhutan on 17 December 2010 for 49 years of service under the Third and Fourth Kings. The Fifth King said that Lam Dorji had already received the highest awards of the nation but was being recognized as a symbolic gesture to present him to the youth as an example and to show that "service to the nation shall never go forgotten."
