= Royal Bhutan Police =

Royal Bhutan Police རྒྱལ་གཞུང་འབྲུག་གི་འགག་སྡེ
- Emblem

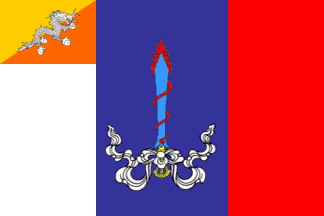
- Flag
- Motto: Truth, Service & Security

Agency overview
- Formed: 1951 C.E. (2007 B.S.)

Jurisdictional structure
- National agency (Operations jurisdiction): BT
- Operations jurisdiction: BT
- Legal jurisdiction: Bhutan
- Primary governing body: Royal Government of Bhutan
- Secondary governing body: Ministry of Home and Cultural Affairs (Bhutan)
- Constituting instrument: Royal Bhutan Police Act, 2009
- General nature: Gendarmerie; Civilian police

Operational structure
- Headquarters: Thimpu, Bhutan
- Agency executive: Major General Chimi Dorji, Chief of Police

Website
- www.rbp.gov.bt

The Royal Bhutan Police (Dzongkha: རྒྱལ་གཞུང་འབྲུག་གི་འགག་སྡེ་; gyal-zhung druk-ki gaag-de) is the national police force of the Kingdom of Bhutan. It is responsible for maintaining law and order and prevention of crime in Bhutan. It was formed on 1 September 1965 with 555 personnel reassigned from the Royal Bhutan Army. It was then called the "Bhutan Frontier Guards". Its independent statutory basis was first codified with the Royal Bhutan Police Act of 1980. This framework was repealed and replaced in its entirety by the Royal Bhutan Police Act of 2009.

== Royal Bhutan Police ==
In addition to law enforcement, the mandate of the Royal Bhutan Police has grown since Act of 2009 to include managing prisons, facilitating youth development and rehabilitation, and disaster management. (Note: Police Act 2009: ¶¶ 124–125)

The Act of 2009 provides the Royal Bhutan Police a substantive and procedural framework for jurisdictions, powers arrest (with and without warrant), investigation, prosecution, search and seizure, summoning witnesses, and regulating public assembly and public nuisance. (Note: Police Act 2009: ¶¶ 68–78, 90–113) It also codifies a framework for receiving complaints from the public. (Note: Police Act 2009: ¶¶ 86–89)

The police are authorized to use force to "quell a disturbance of the peace, or to disperse an unlawful assembly, which either refused to disperse or shows a determination not to disperse," however the use of force must be limited "as much as possible" using "the least deadly weapon which the circumstances permit." (Note: Police Act 2009: ¶¶ 79–80) Non-lethal measures required before lethal force may be used include water cannons, tear smoke, riot batons, and rubber pellets; shooting live ammunition into crowds is authorized only after firing warning shots into the air. (Note: Police Act 2009: ¶¶ 81–84)

The Act of 2009 includes a code of conduct, duties, special duties during elections and disasters, and prohibition against engaging in political activities. (Note: Police Act 2009: ¶¶ 39–44) It also regulates firearms for both police and civilians, requiring registration of private firearms with the police. (Note: Police Act 2009: ¶¶ 63–67)

=== Ranks and designations ===
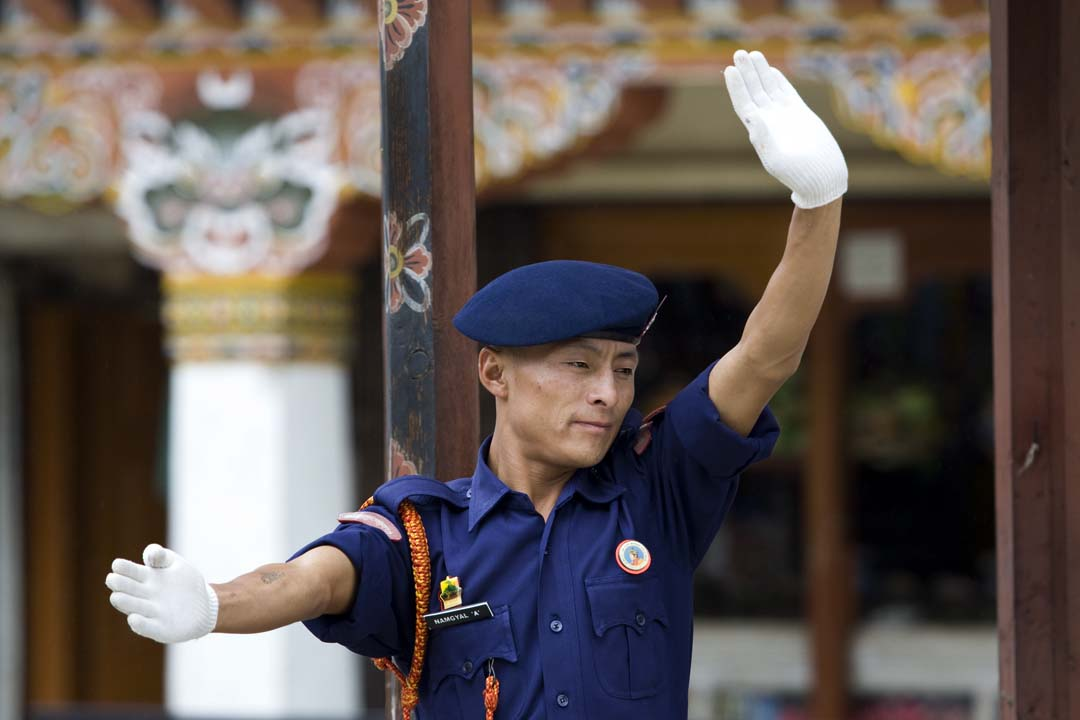
Traffic police in Thimphu. There are no stop lights or traffic signals in all of Bhutan.

The Act of 2009 establishes the following ranks and designations: (Note: Police Act 2009: ¶¶ 16, 211)

1. Gagpoen, the Chief of Police
2. Thrimdang Chichhab, the Additional and Deputy Chiefs of Police
3. Thrimdag Gongma, the Senior Superintendents of Police, Field and Special Divisions
4. Thrimdag Wogma, the Superintendents of Police, Field and Special Divisions
5. Dungda, the Additional Superintendents of Police, Field and Special Divisions
6. Yongzin, Officer Commanding, Police Stations (commissioned officer)
7. Dechhab, Officer Commanding, Police Stations (commissioned officer)
8. Gopoen Lopjongpa, Officer Probationer
9. Jugpoen Gongma, Officer In charge/In charge (junior commissioned or non-commissioned officer)
10. Jugpoen, Officer In charge/In charge (junior commissioned or non-commissioned officer)
11. Jungpoen Wogma, Officer In charge/In charge (junior commissioned or non-commissioned officer)
12. Juglop Gongma, In charge (junior commissioned or non-commissioned officer)
13. Juglop, In charge (junior commissioned or non-commissioned officer)
14. Quilop Gongma
15. Quilop
16. Denkul
17. Gopa
18. Gagpa (constables)

The Chief of Police and Additional and Deputy Chiefs of Police are appointed by the Druk Gyalpo from among a list of names recommended by the Prime Minister, from among the list submitted by the Police Service board based on seniority, qualification, and capability. (Note: Police Act 2009: ¶ 18) Any other appointments above, as well as directors of Training Institutes, are appointed by the Chief of Police on recommendation of the Police Service Board. (Note: Police Act 2009: ¶¶ 3–9)

The Chief of Police is empowered with wide discretion in the command of the Royal Bhutan Police, including budgetary matters; policy decisions; promotions, awards, and punishments on the advice of the Service Board; issuing orders on anything relating to Police activities; and delegating his powers as he may think expedient. (Note: Police Act 2009: ¶¶ 21–23, 180–189, 195–196) He reports to the Minister for Home and Cultural Affairs.

Officers Commanding and Officers In charge of police stations submit daily and other regular reports to Superintendents of Police, who in turn submit similar reports to Police Headquarters in Thimphu. (Note: Police Act 2009: ¶ 45) At both levels, authorities keep extensive registers and diaries of convictions, cases, seizures, arrests, absconders, custody, and town and village information. (Note: Police Act 2009: ¶¶ 49–58) Officers Commanding and Officers In charge must also provide similar reports to authorities on the Dzongkhag and Dungkhag levels. (Note: Police Act 2009: ¶ 59)

=== Bureaus ===
The Investigation Bureau operates directly under the Chief of Police to collect intelligence and information relating to criminal and subversive activities against the Tsa-Wa-Sum and is headed by the Deputy Chief (IB) (Note: Police Act 2009: ¶ 116)

The National Central Bureau located at the Police Headquarters liaises with other Interpol member countries and Sub-Regional Bureaus. It assists the Investigation Bureau. (Note: Police Act 2009: ¶ 117)

=== Field and special divisions ===
Field divisions are the various police divisions in the Dzongkhags. (Note: Police Act 2009: ¶ 211) The Special Police Divisions under the Additional Chief of Police are at par with the Field Divisions and are headed by Superintendents of Police or by Directors. The Special Divisions established by the Act of 2009 are: (Note: Police Act 2009: ¶¶ 118–129)

- Intelligence and Investigation Division
- Planning and Human Resource Development Division
- Traffic Division
- Fire Services Division
- Security Division – for VIPs, foreign dignitaries, and vital installations
- Prison Services Division
- Youth Development and Rehabilitation Centre (YDRC)
- Information Communication Technology Division (ICTD)
- Special Reserve Police Force (SRPF) – for counter-terrorism, support, and miscellaneous duties
- Narcotic Drugs and other Vices Division
- Women and Child Protection Division
- Police Training Institutes

The Chief of Police may, in his discretion, recommend to the Royal Government for the ration and abolition of divisions, police stations, check-posts, out-posts, and other units. (Note: Police Act 2009: ¶ 17)

In 2020 Lieutenant Colonel Karma Rigzin, founder of the Women and Child Protection Division, was named by the US State Department as one of their "heroes" for her work to stop trafficking of women and children.

==== Prisons in Bhutan ====
Under the Royal Bhutan Police Act of 2009 and the Prison Act of 2009, the Prison Services Division is responsible for maintaining and administering the prisons of Bhutan. There are 21 prisons in the country: one in each dzongkhag for those punished for up to third degree felonies, plus Central Prison (Tshoenkhang Yoema) for those who commit first or second degree felonies. There are also Youth Development and Rehabilitation Centres for juvenile (under age 18) convicts. The Division personnel consist of a senior superintendent, superintendent, and additional superintendent; officers in charge of the central (national) and dzongkhag prisons; prison wardens and guards; and medical officers. Personnel begin as police, undergo training in prison administration at government-run Training Institutes, and occupy their posts for two year terms. Under the Prison Act, the police chief, in consultation with the Minister of Home Affairs, may declare "any house, building, enclosure or place, or any part thereof" to be a prison or reformative training centre.

Prisoners themselves are categorized as "civil prisoners," criminal prisoners, prisoners charged under the National Security Act, and military personnel convicted in military court. Detainees are classed as those under criminal investigation, detainees under trial, and other detainees "as directed by court for civil cases." Populations of civil, criminal, and political prisoners are to be separated from each other while inside. Prisoners may wear their own clothing, subject to a dress code, and may even raise children on prison grounds through age nine. Prisoners are allowed spousal conjugal visits, provided female prisoners agree to prevent conception. These benefits are balanced by six-day weeks of hard labour within the prisons, imposed on all but juveniles, the physically and mentally infirm, political prisoners, and prisoners with pending trials.

=== Royal Bhutan Police Service Board ===
Under the Act of 2009, the Royal Bhutan Police Service Board formulates policies, rules, regulations, and guidelines for the police concerning organization; administration; staffing; promotion, classification, and grading of services; higher or continuing policing education; performance evaluation and appraisal; development of efficient police process; Police Support Selection Examinations; Police Support Cadre Selection Procedures; and police office and material management. (Note: Police Act 2009: ¶ 30) All policies, Service Rules, and regulations formulated and decided by the Board are submitted to the Chief of Police for endorsement and for submission to the Home and Cultural Affairs Minister for approval. (Note: Police Act 2009: ¶ 38)

The Royal Bhutan Police Service Board consists of eleven members appointed by the Minister for Home and Cultural Affairs upon recommendation of the Chief of Police. Its members include Additional Chief of Police (chair); the Head of the Law and Order Bureau within the Ministry of Home and Cultural Affairs; one Deputy Chief of Police (Member Secretary); one Senior Superintendent of Police; one director of the Police Training Institutes; two Superintendents of Police from Field Divisions; two Superintendents of Police from the Special Division; one Additional Superintendent of Police from the Field Division; and one Officer Commanding of the Police Station not below the rank of Yongzin. The first two are permanent members; all others serve two-year terms with a limit of two consecutive terms. (Note: Police Act 2009: ¶¶ 27–29)

== History of the Royal Bhutan Police ==
The Royal Bhutan Police was formed on 1 September 1965 with 555 personnel reassigned from the Royal Bhutan Army, and had grown to over 1,000 by the late 1970s. Since its establishment, Indian police advisers and instructors have been used. Starting in 1975, Bhutanese instructors, trained in India for one year, began training recruits at the Zilnon Namgyeling Police Training Centre. Advanced training for selected police officers in fields such as criminology, traffic control, and canine corps has taken place in India and other countries. In 1988, following specialized training in India, a female second lieutenant established a fingerprint bureau in Thimphu. Besides having access to training at the Indian Police Academy in Hyderabad, some students were also sent to the Police Executive Development Course in Singapore.

Besides performing their standard police functions, members of the Royal Bhutan Police also served as border guards and firefighters and provided first aid. In 1975, in response to the increased number of traffic accidents resulting from the development of roads and the increase number of motor vehicles, the police established an experimental mobile traffic court staff with Royal Bhutan Police personnel and a judicial official to make on-the-spot legal decisions.

On September 19, 2005 Bhutan became a member of Interpol. Interpol maintains a National Central Bureau at Royal Bhutan Police headquarters in Thimphu.

As of 2005, recruits were trained at the Police Training Centers in Zilnon Namgyeling - Thimphu, Jigmeling - Gelephu and Tashigatshel - Chukha. A nine-month basic training course for constables included physical exercise and drills, weapons training, martial arts (taekwondo), law, public relations, riot control, investigation techniques, check post duties, traffic control, VIP escort and driglam namzha. An additional six-week course provided scientific investigation techniques, photography, administration, accounting, canine handling and other related subjects. A six-week refresher course was also conducted.

Selected officers were sent for basic and advanced training abroad. In India, Royal Bhutan Police officers were trained at the Sardar Vallabhbhai Patel National Police Academy in Hyderabad and the Punjab Police Academy. Officers were sent to Australia to specialise in DNA analysis and other advanced techniques of forensic science. Officers have also attended a Police Executive Development course in Singapore.

=== The Organization of Royal Bhutan Police ===
- Organisation & Structure - http://www.rbp.gov.bt/organo.php
- Divisions - http://www.rbp.gov.bt/contact.php

=== Royal Bhutan Police Act 2009 ===
- http://www.rbp.gov.bt/Forms/Police%20Act.pdf

=== Organisation and structure under the Act of 1980 ===
In 1991, the Royal Bhutan Police was organizationally subordinate to the Royal Bhutan Army and under the command of Major General Lam Dorji, who was also chief of operations of the army, holding the title inspector general or commandant. There were police headquarters in each district and subdistrict. In 1991, the police was headed by the Chief of Police under whom there are commissioned officers, non-commissioned officers, and constables. In April 2008, the Chief of Police was Maksi Gom (Colonel) Kipchu Namgyel.

The headquarters of the Royal Bhutan Police in Thimphu was divided into three branches directly under the Chief of Police:

General Division

- General welfare of the Royal Bhutan Police
- Prison administration

Crime Division

- Crime prevention and detection
- Investigation of criminal cases
- Maintenance of crime records
- Research work
- Traffic control

Administrative Division

- Training
- VIP security
- Motor transport
- Communications systems
- Arms and ammunition
- Publications
- Sports activities

The Royal Bhutan Police structures districts into "ranges" which are under the administrative control of "range police officers." A "district police officer" heads the police force in a district. There are a number of police stations, outposts, and checkpoints in a district and the highest-ranked officer is usually designated the Officer-in-Charge of that particular area.

Range I

- Thimphu
- Phuentsholing
- Wangdiphodrang

Range II

- Gelephu
- Tsirang
- Tongsa

Range III

- Samdrup Jongkhar
- Mongar
- Trashigang

== See also ==
- Law enforcement in Bhutan
- Intelligence and Investigation Division
- Ministry of Home and Cultural Affairs
- Lieutenant Colonel Karma Rigzin
