= Military of Bhutan =

Combined military forces of Bhutan

The armed forces of Bhutan is the Royal Bhutan Army (RBA). Bhutan does not have an air force, nor (being a landlocked country) a navy. India is responsible for military training, arms supplies and the air defense of Bhutan. Bhutan's army is trained by the Indian Armed Forces.

== Air support ==
The RBA relies on the Eastern Air Command of the Indian Air Force for air assistance. In recent years India has helped Bhutan start to develop its military in all areas through military donations and training. Total 8,000 Army personnel. Historically, on 1 of January 1971 the Government of Bhutan decided to increase military personnel to 4,850 by recruiting additional 600-700 recruits and stricter regulations on liberation from service. Indian Air Force helicopters evacuated RBA casualties to India for treatment during Operation All Clear in 2003.
