= Royal Bhutan Army =

Land warfare branch of Bhutan's military forces

- བསྟན་སྲུང་དམག་སྡེ་
- Flag of Royal Bhutan Army
- Founded: 1958; 68 years ago
- Service branches: Royal Bodyguard of Bhutan
- Headquarters: Lungtenphu, Thimphu
- Website: rba.bt

Leadership
- Supreme Commander: Druk Gyalpo Jigme Khesar Namgyel Wangchuck
- Chief Operations Officer: Batoo Tshering

Personnel
- Military age: 18
- Active personnel: 16,000+ (estimated)
- Reserve personnel: 40,000–60,000 (approximately)
- Deployed personnel: 211 (UN peacekeeping)

Related articles
- History: Military history of Bhutan
- Ranks: Military ranks of Bhutan

The Royal Bhutan Army (RBA; Dzongkha: བསྟན་སྲུང་དམག་སྡེ་, romanized: bStan-srung dmag-sde) is a branch of the armed forces of the Kingdom of Bhutan responsible for maintaining the country's territorial integrity and sovereignty against security threats. The king of Bhutan is the supreme commander in chief of the RBA. The chief operations officer is Goonglon Gongma (Lt. Gen.) Batoo Tshering.

The RBA includes the Royal Bodyguard of Bhutan (RBG), an elite branch of the armed forces responsible for the security of the king, the royal family and other officials.

It was customary, but not obligatory, for one son from each Bhutanese family to serve in the army. In addition, militia may be recruited during emergencies. It may, from time to time, be called on to assist the Royal Bhutan Police (RBP) in maintaining law and order.

== History ==
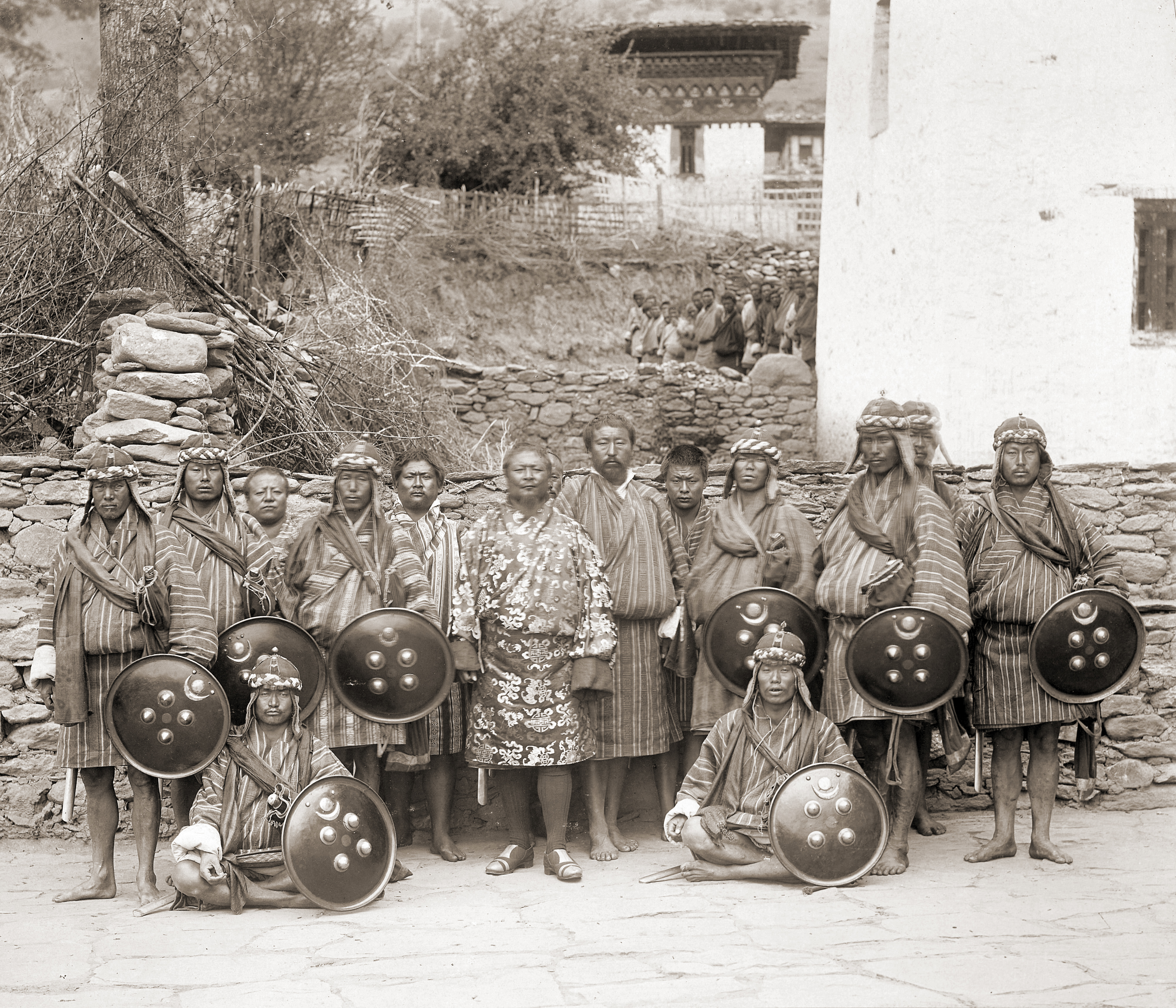
First King of Bhutan Gongsar Ugyen Wangchuck with his bodyguards in 1905 before the formation of the RBA

With intense support from India, the RBA was formed in the 1950s in response to the Chinese annexation and subsequent People's Liberation Army actions in Tibet. In 1958, the Royal Government of Bhutan introduced a conscription system and plans for a standing army of 2,500 soldiers. The Indian government had also repeatedly urged and pressured Bhutan to end its neutrality or isolationist policy and accept Indian economic and military assistance. This was because India considered Bhutan one of the most vulnerable sectors in its strategic defense system in regards to China. When Bhutan accepted the Indian offer, the Indian Army became responsible for the training and equipping of the RBA. By 1968 the RBA consisted of 4,850 soldiers; by 1990 this had risen to 6,000. Following the increases after an anti-militant operation in 2003, the RBA peaked at over 9,000 in 2007 before being reduced to 8,000 in 2008. By 2017 the military rose to approximately 10,000 or above.

Bhutanese officers were deployed to UNDOF as staff officers in 2015.

In 2021, the first cohort of women were admitted to the Army.

== Relationship with the Indian Armed Forces ==
The Indian Army maintains a training mission in Bhutan, known as the Indian Military Training Team (IMTRAT), which is responsible for the training of RBA and RBG personnel. All RBA and RBG officers are trained at the Indian Army's officer training institutes, namely the National Defence Academy (NDA) in Pune, and the Indian Military Academy (IMA) in Dehradun.

IMTRAT is a military training mission in western Bhutan. Its primary role is training the personnel of the Royal Bhutan Army (RBA). It does not serve as a combat force and does not conduct operational deployments.

Bhutan's border defense, internal security, and combat operations fall under the Royal Bhutan Army (RBA).

During actual military engagements on Bhutanese soil, such as the 2003 Operation All Clear against Indian militant camps in southern Bhutan, combat operations were executed exclusively by the Royal Bhutan Army (RBA).

During Operation All Clear in December 2003, India initially offered to send a large deployment of Indian Army troops into southern Bhutan to clear out the camps established by Northeast Indian militant groups. His Majesty the Fourth King, Jigme Singye Wangchuck, declined the offer to protect Bhutan's sovereignty and ensure no foreign military conducted combat operations on Bhutanese soil. Combat operations were executed exclusively by the Royal Bhutan Army (RBA).

Project DANTAK of the Border Roads Organisation, a subdivision of the Indian Army Corps of Engineers, has been operating in Bhutan since May 1961. Since then Project DANTAK has been responsible for the construction and maintenance of over 1,500 km of roads and bridges, Paro Airport and Yongphulla Airport (upgraded in 2018, with scheduled fixed-wing civilian flights), heliports and other infrastructure.

=== Army aviation ===
The Royal Bhutan Army relies on Eastern Air Command of the Indian Air Force for air medical evacuation assistance. Indian Air Force helicopters evacuated RBA casualties to India for treatment during Operation All Clear in 2003.

== 2003 Operation: All Clear ==
During the early '90s Indian separatist groups United Liberation Front of Assam (ULFA), National Democratic Front of Bodoland (NDFB) and Kamtapur Liberation Organization (KLO) had begun to clandestinely set up camps in Bhutan's dense southern jungles. These camps were used to train militants, store equipment and launch attacks on targets in India. The Bhutanese government became aware of their presence in 1996, and from 1997 the issue was regularly discussed in the National Assembly. The Government of India began exerting diplomatic pressure on the Royal Government of Bhutan to remove the militant presence and offered to conduct joint military operations with Bhutan against the militants. The Royal Government of Bhutan, preferring a peaceful solution, declined the offer and instead initiated dialogue with the militant groups in 1998. By December 2003 negotiations had failed to produce any agreement and the Royal Government, unable to tolerate the groups' presence any longer, issued a 48-hour ultimatum on 13 December. On 15 December the RBA commenced military operations against the militant groups.

=== Combat operations ===
Under the leadership of King Jigme Singye Wangchuck the RBA and RBG, with a total strength of 6,000, attacked an estimated 3,000 militants spread across 30 camps. By 27 December 2003 all 30 camps had been captured. Additionally, the RBA seized "more than 500 AK 47/56 assault rifles and 500 other assorted weapons including rocket launchers and mortars, along with more than 1,000,000 rounds of ammunition. An anti-aircraft gun was also found at the site of the GHQ of the ULFA."

By 3 January 2004 all 30 camps (ULFA-14, NDFB-11, KLO-5) and an additional 35 observation posts were destroyed and the militants dislodged. A total of 485 ULFA, NDFB and KLO militants were killed or captured; those captured along with the seized weapons and ammunition were handed over to the Government of India. Captured non-combatants were handed over to Assamese civil authorities. The RBA suffered 11 soldiers killed in action and 35 wounded in action.

== Personnel ==
As of 2008 the RBA stood at 8,000 active-duty personnel. This follows an initiative introduced in 2005 by the Royal Government of Bhutan to reduce the strength of the RBA while increasing militia training of the Bhutanese population.

=== Army Welfare Project ===
The Army Welfare Project (AWP) is a commercial enterprise of the RBA established in 1974 to provide benefits for retired RBA and RBG personnel in the form of employment, pensions and loans. The AWP manufactures alcoholic beverages in two distilleries located in Gelephu and Samtse.

== Bases ==
The Royal Bhutan Army maintains a camp at Zompelri which is a border outpost under the control of army's Wing I at Tendruk, Samtse.

The Royal Bhutan Army's Military Training Centre is in Tencholing, Wangduephodrang.

== See also ==
- Tensung FC
