= Royal Bodyguard of Bhutan =

- Flag of Royal Bodyguard of Bhutan
- Country: Bhutan
- Type: Royal guard
- Part of: Royal Bhutan Army
- Engagements: Insurgency in Northeast India; Operation All Clear

Commanders
- Current commander: Brigadier General Pem Dorji
- Notable commanders: Major General Dhendup Tshering; Brigadier Thinley Tobgyel

The Royal Bodyguard (RBG) of Bhutan is the royal guard of the Kingdom of Bhutan and a part of the Royal Bhutan Army (RBA), which specializes in anti-irregular military, clandestine and covert operations, commando-style raids, countering sudden attacks, counterintelligence to prevent assassination of royal family members or royal palace sabotage, counterterrorism and hostage rescue missions, irregular warfare, mountain warfare, special operations, and protection of important or high-ranking personnel. It has a size of more than 1,000 soldiers.

It is independently under the personal command of the King of Bhutan (as of 2026, Jigme Khesar Namgyel Wangchuck). The commandant is Brigadier Pem Dorji.

== History ==
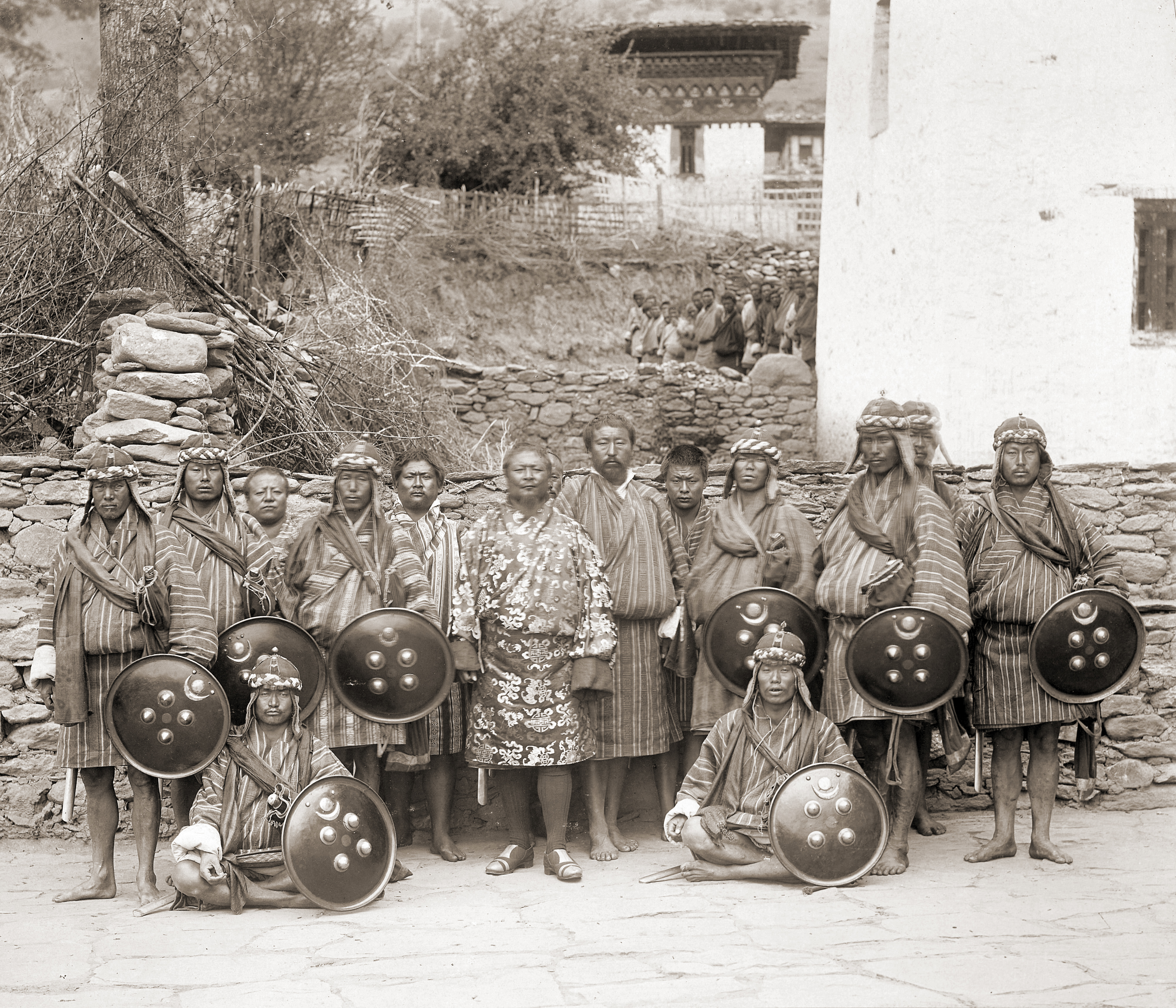
The first King of Bhutan, Ugyen Wangchuck, with his bodyguards at Trongsa Dzong, 1905.

Under the personal command of the fourth king, Jigme Singye Wangchuck, the Royal Bodyguard of Bhutan allegedly saw action in 2003 during brief clashes with militants belonging to the United Liberation Front of Asom camped in Bhutan. The guards suffered few casualties and would participate in a campaign to expel ULFA and other Assamese separatist groups from the South of Bhutan in late 2003.

== Training ==
RBG soldiers are trained at the Lo Dzong Military School.
