= List of companies of Bhutan =

Location of Bhutan

Bhutan is a landlocked country and the second largest Himalayan state in Asia. Located in the Eastern Himalayas, it is bordered by China in the north and India in the south. Bhutan is separated from Nepal by the Indian state of Sikkim and from Bangladesh by the Indian states of West Bengal and Assam. With over 700,000 inhabitants, its population is the seventh largest in South Asia. Thimphu is its capital and largest city, while Phuntsholing is its financial and commercial center.

Bhutan has the second highest per capita income in South Asia after the Maldives. Hydroelectricity accounts for the major share of its exports. The government is a parliamentary democracy.

== Notable firms ==
This list includes notable companies with primary headquarters located in the country. The industry and sector follow the Industry Classification Benchmark taxonomy. Organizations which have ceased operations are included and noted as defunct.

Notable companies Status: P=Private, S=State; A=Active, D=Defunct
Name	Industry	Sector	Headquarters	Founded	Notes	Status	
Bhutan Airlines	Consumer services	Airlines	Thimphu	2011	Airline, part of Tashi Group	P	A
Bhutan Broadcasting Service	Consumer services	Broadcasting & entertainment	Thimphu	1973	State owned television broadcaster	S	A
Bhutan Observer	Consumer services	Publishing	Thimphu	2006	Online newspaper	P	A
Bhutan Postal Corporation	Industrials	Delivery services	Thimphu	1996	Postal services	P	A
Bhutan Times	Consumer services	Publishing	Thimphu	2006	Newspaper	P	A
Bhutan Today	Consumer services	Publishing	Thimphu	2008	Newspaper	P	A
Business Bhutan	Consumer services	Publishing	Thimphu	2009	Financial newspaper	P	A
Druk Air	Consumer services	Airlines	Paro	1981	Flag carrier airline	P	A
Druk Yoedzer	Consumer services	Publishing	Thimphu	2011	Private newspaper	P	A
Kuensel	Consumer services	Publishing	Thimphu	1967	State owned newspaper	S	A
Royal Insurance Corporation of Bhutan	Financials	Full line insurance	Thimphu	1975	Insurance	P	A
Royal Monetary Authority of Bhutan	Financials	Banks	Thimphu	1982	Central Bank	S	A
Taj Tashi	Consumer services	Hotels	Thimphu	2008	5 star hotel	P	A
Tashi Group	Conglomerates	-	Phuntsholing	1959	Airline, technology, financials	P	A
The Bhutanese	Consumer services	Publishing	Thimphu	2012	Newspaper	P	A
The Journalist	Consumer services	Publishing	Thimphu	2009	Weekly newspaper	P	A

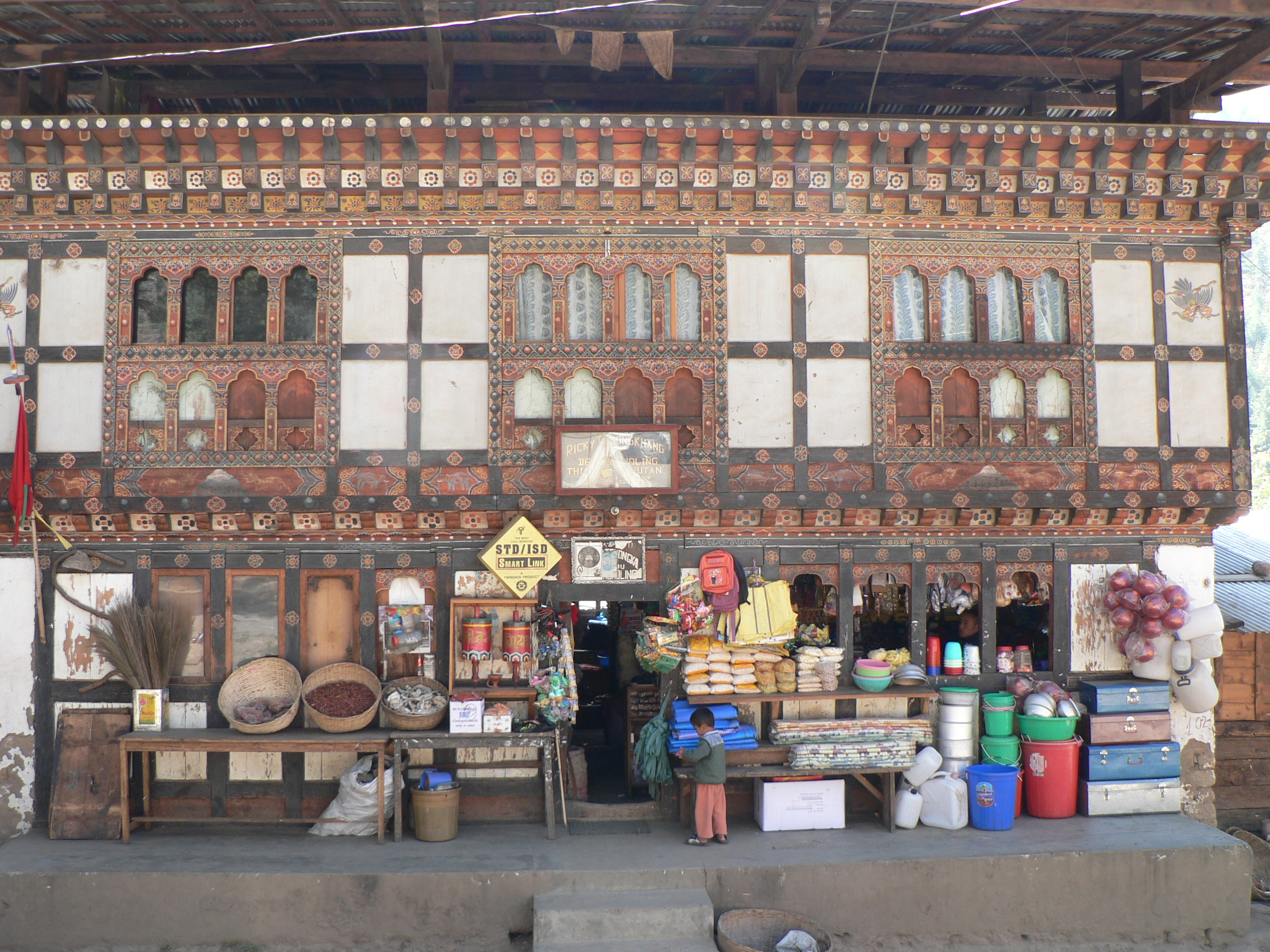
Shops in the lower market of Thimphu

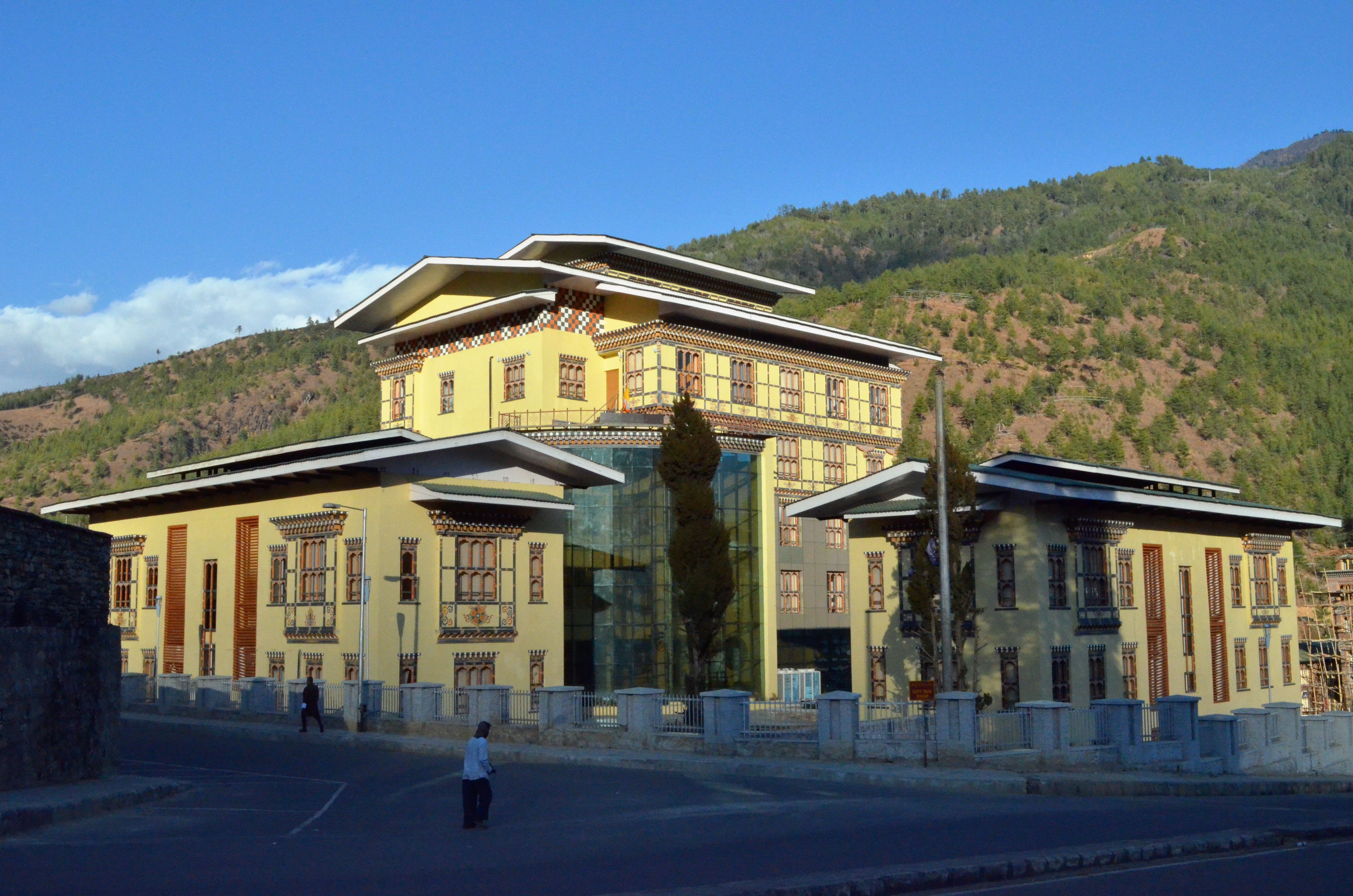
The Bhutan Power Corporation headquarters in Thimphu

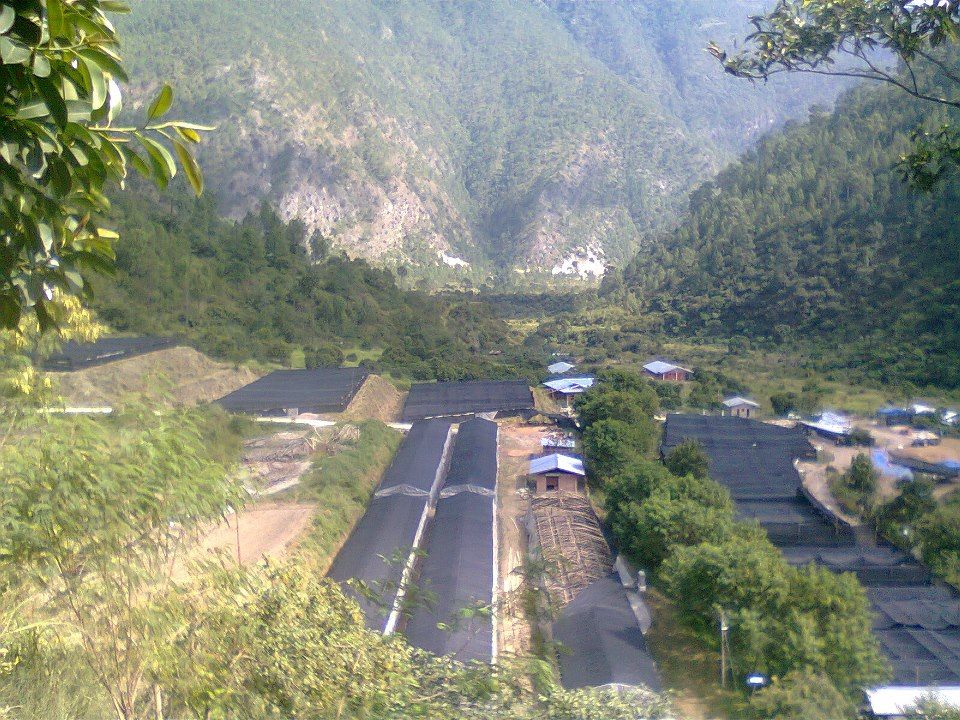
Hazelnut nursery in Lingmethang.

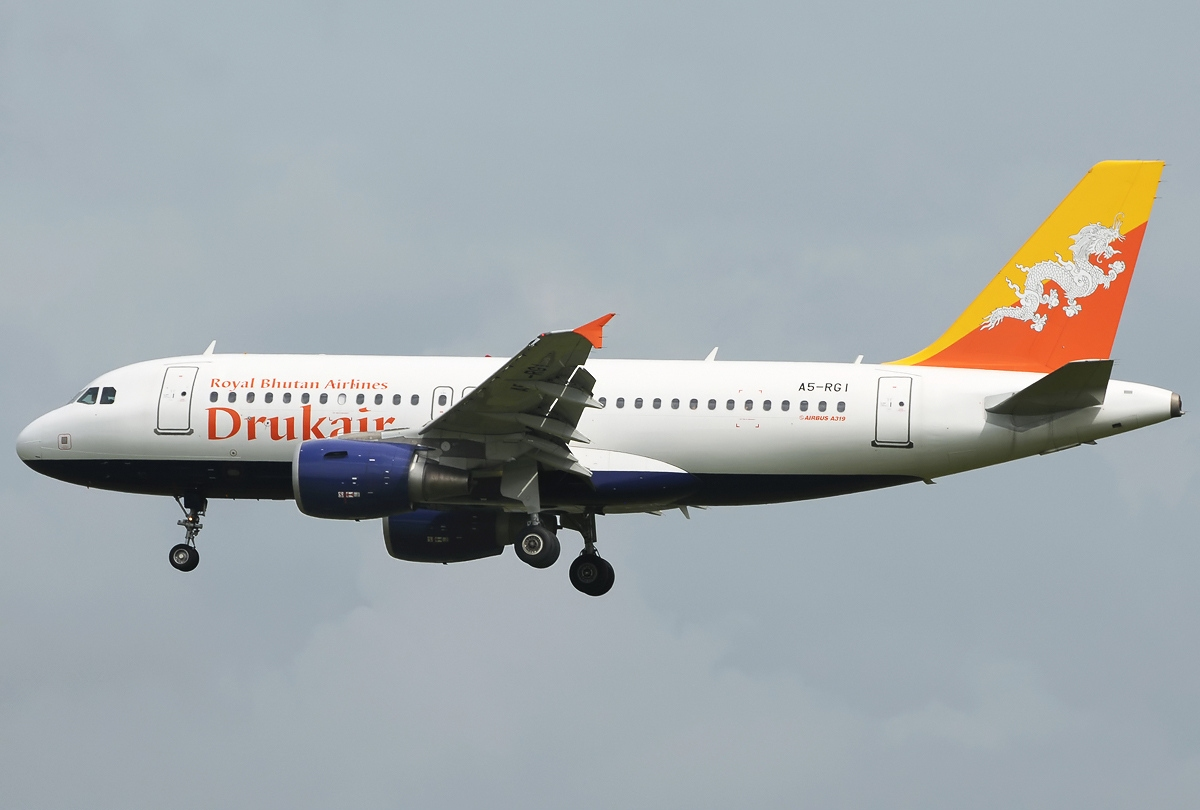
Druk Air, the national airline.
