= List of newspapers in Bhutan =

Below is a list of newspapers published in Bhutan.

- Bhutan Observer — English and Dzongkha; formerly bi-weekly, now only online
- Bhutan Times — English; weekly
- Bhutan Today — English; bi-weekly
- Bhutan Youth — English
- The Bhutanese — English and Dzongkha; weekly
- Business Bhutan — English and Dzongkha; weekly
- Daily Bhutan
- Druk Neytshul — Dzongkha
- Druk Yoedzer — Dzongkha
- Gyalchi Sarshog — Dzongkha
- The Journalist — English and Dzongkha; weekly
- Kuensel — English and Dzongkha; daily

== External sites with news about Bhutan ==
- Bhutan News Network - English and Nepali; located outside Bhutan
- Bhutan News Service - English and Nepali; located outside Bhutan

== See also ==
- Media of Bhutan
