= Mass media in Bhutan =

The various mass media in Bhutan have historically been government-controlled, although this has changed in recent years. The country has its own newspapers, television and radio broadcasters and Internet Service Providers.

== Journalism ==
Kuensel, a newspaper of a government-owned corporation, circulates six days a week in Dzongkha and English. In 2006 two privately owned, independent newspapers were launched as part of preparation for the country's move to democracy: Bhutan Times, and Bhutan Observer, which also produced a Dzongkha edition. Bhutan Today, an English daily newspaper launched in October 2008. The Journalist established in 2009 is a privately owned weekly English Language newspaper published on Sundays. In late September 2009, the first Financial Newspaper of Bhutan was launched with the name Business Bhutan.

According to Freedom House, private newspapers in Bhutan face "financial fragility" and rely on government advertisements for approximately 80 percent of their income. Since private media outlets were made legal in 2006, the number of private media outlets has grown, reducing the access of each outlet to that revenue. In 2012, a financial crisis occurred and the government chose to only run advertisements for the then-upcoming 2013 elections on state media outlets. Due to their financial condition, newspapers cut their staff, and some implemented additional cost-cutting measures such as switching from publishing daily to publishing bi-weekly and temporarily ceasing to produce a print edition. The government was accused of intentionally reducing advertising revenue to retaliate against The Bhutanese's reporting on governmental corruption. Some of the newspapers folded in this process. Today Kuensel is the only newspaper in the country published daily with two language editions, Dzongkha and English. Currently there are only five private newspapers in the country. 2008 the Bhutan Centre for Media and Democracy was launched to "nurture democracy in Bhutan through civic engagement, public discourse and media literate citizens".

== Radio and television ==
The Bhutan Broadcasting Service was established in 1973 as a radio service, broadcasting all over the country in short wave and on the FM band in Thimphu. Before the introduction of local television, there was spillover from services in India and Bangladesh, blocked by the mountainous terrain of the southern lowlands. Satellite dishes were banned in 1989, also ordering the removal of dishes that were already installed. Such a ban was necessary because foreign programming would undermine "Bhutan's rich cultural heritage", until Bhutan would have its own service. The service started television broadcasts in 1998, in a pilot phase for Thimphu residents to watch the 1998 FIFA World Cup, and a regular local service from BBS in 1999, making Bhutan the last country in the world to introduce a local television service. As part of the King's modernization program, cable television was introduced shortly after, in December. By 2002, however, the crime rate had increased appreciably, and the introduction of cable television is alleged to be responsible for the spurt in crime. The Bhutan Broadcasting Service (BBS) has been expanded and will be available in Bhutan and will also be available in the region. The signal can be received in almost forty other countries, including Turkey to Indonesia. The Bhutan Broadcasting Service has now assumed the role of a true national broadcaster said the minister of information and communications. In 2008 the adoption of the constitution by Lyonpo Leki Dorji meant that the BBS would now be taking on a more pivotal role in educating the public. When they took the role to educate the public this meant they had to improve the quality of news and programs because it became imperative. Sudhir Vyas, ambassador of Bhutan, thinks India is privileged to be associated with the development of media in Bhutan. This symbolized the role that the government played in the development of Bhutan. The Bhutan Broadcasting Service has also been said to be the cheapest and easiest way to educate people. Privately owned FM radio stations include Kuzoo FM and Radio Valley FM.

There are three television channels in Bhutan, all of which owned by BBS: BBS 1, BBS 2 and BBS 3. In 2011, ahead of the launch of BBS 2, BICMA received six bids for private television channels.

== Electronic media ==
The government issued an order to DoT MoC in April 1999 to get internet working by June 2, 1999, giving them three months to get it done. Bhutan has about 295,000 Internet users, 25,200 landline subscribers, and 676,000 mobile phone subscribers. Bhutan's only Internet service provider is Druknet which is owned by Bhutan Telecom. The mobile subscriber in 2014 was at 14%. As the market began to mature in 2015 it was 5% and 2% in 2015 and 2016, as market penetration reached 88% in 2016. It has been predicted in the next five years or so there will be a moderate growth. Over this time the mobile subscriber has reached an excessive of 100% at times. Internet access in the country has had a major boost by mobile networks, largely by EDGE/GPRS and the new 3G technology platforms. Even though this is the case now because they have been isolated from the rest of the world for a long time until the 1990s. The fixed telephone lines are declining in Bhutan from a small base as the mobile segment keeps expanding. Penetrations have dropped over the years as in 2014 dropped to 3.1%, 2015 dropped to 2.9%, and 2016 dropped to 2.7%. Internet in Bhutan developed down a slow path during the beginning of the internet because the country embraced the internet cautiously which is still continuing to be low because the country is struggling economically. Fixed broadband penetration is increasing from a small base as it has continued over the past few years. Penetration has increased by 2.3% in 2012, 3.1% in 2014, 4% in 2016, and is predicted to grow in the next five years until 2021.

By January 2021 there were 373.2 thousand internet users in Bhutan.

== Social Media ==
On any given day a Bhutanese spends an average of 163 minutes on social media. The most popular social media amongst the Bhutanese are Facebook, WeChat and YouTube. The use of TikTok is also on the rise.

Social media has been used in Bhutan to bring about change. In 2011, a concerned citizen of Bhutan started a digital campaign on Facebook with the objective of convincing the government to amend an Act which was recently passed and was being strictly implemented. The campaign started in the form of a page on Facebook. It was called, "Amend the Tobacco Control Act". It was the first of its kind in Bhutan since the arrival of internet in the country in 1999. The campaign was not only successful but also garnered media attention both locally and internationally. It also influenced political discourse in the country.

== Film ==
"Gasa Lamai Singye" was the first film made by Ugyen Wangdi, the founder of the country's fledgling cinema, in 1989. The Bhutanese lama Dzongsar Jamyang Khyentse Rinpoche is a well-known filmmaker, who produced and directed The Cup and Travellers and Magicians. While The Cup was shot in a Tibetan monastery in northern India, Travellers and Magicians was the first feature film to be filmed entirely in Bhutan, with a cast consisting entirely of Bhutanese people. No professional actors were used in either film. Historically, films in Bhutan were often adaptations of Bollywood films however in recent years film makers are aiming at defining Bhutanese cinema, nevertheless influence from Bollywood is still a major inspiration. More recently the popularity of Korean dramas have also had some effect on Bhutanese cinema. In 2022 the country's first nomination Lunana: A Yak in the Classroom, for best international feature for the Oscars was a debut from director Pawo Choyning Dorji.

== Over The Top Platforms ==
In 2021 Bhutan saw the start of two OTT platforms Songyala and Samuh The platforms, which stream live video content to any internet-enabled device, can be accessed from 60 countries across the world. The content on the platform includes entertainment and infotainment spanning across different sectors such as original films, original web series, documentaries, music videos, shows, and animation programs for children, among others These platforms can be downloaded as apps or viewed on a browser.
