= Jomolhari (typeface) =

- Classification: Serif; Transitional; Non-Latin
- Designer: Christopher J. Fynn
- License: SIL Open Font License

Jomolhari is a Tibetan script Uchen font created by Christopher J. Fynn, freely available under the SIL Open Font License. It supports text encoded using the Unicode Standard and the Chinese national standard for encoding characters of the Tibetan script (GB/T20524-2006 "Tibetan Coded Character Set"). The design of the font is based on Bhutanese manuscript examples and it is suitable for text in Tibetan, Dzongkha and other languages written in the Tibetan script. In Latin, it is metrically compatible with Times New Roman.

== Format and license ==
The Jomolhari font is available in OpenType format using TrueType outlines. It is distributed under the terms of the SIL Open Font License.

It may be downloaded from Google Fonts, the Free Tibetan Fonts Project on the Savannah site and several other places. The VOLT project files containing the source of the OpenType lookups in the font are also available on the Savannah site.

It is also available in deb and rpm packages for Linux.

== Usage ==
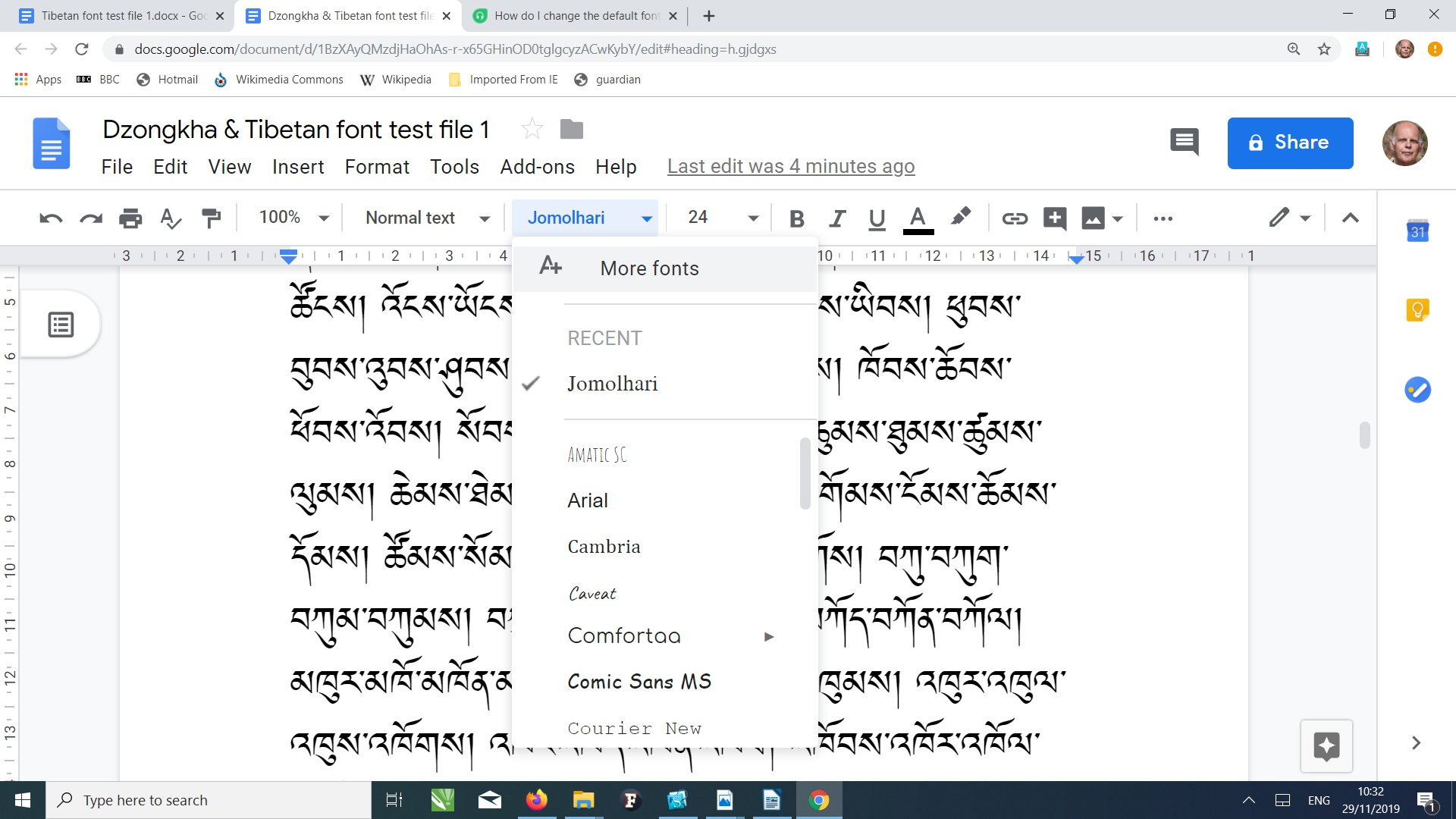
Sample of Jomolhari in Google Docs

- The Jomolhari font is included with many Linux distributions including:
  - Fedora
  - Debian
  - CentOS
  - Ubuntu
  - Dzongkha Linux
- Jomolhari is used as the principal font of several Bhutanese newspapers for their Dzongkha language editions or sections including:
  - Bhutan Observer
  - Bhutan Times
  - Bhutan Today
  - Business Bhutan
  - Druk Yoedzer
- Jomolhari have been the default Tibetan script font being used by MediaWiki (including Wikipedia). This was later replaced by BabelStone Tibetan Slim font.
- Jomolhari is the font used for the website of the National Library of Bhutan for their Dzongkha language pages.
- Jomolhari is also available for typing Dzongkha or Tibetan text in Google Docs.

== Derivative works ==
Jomolhari ID was a fork of Jomolhari to create a font that worked in Adobe InDesign CS3 and CS4, which lacked specific support for Tibetan script. This font included additional general OpenType lookups and features in the font enabling it to work in these versions of InDesign. These additional lookups were later incorporated into the standard Jomolhari font.

Andrew West also created a fork of Jomolhari to add extended support for Tibetan: BabelStone Tibetan. This font added some additional Tibetan characters encoded in a later version of Unicode, added more clusters especially for writing Tibetan shorthand contractions and transcribing Tangut.

== See also ==
- Angsana, a Thai typeface created by Unity Progress that is also metrically compatible with Times New Roman.
