= Television in Bhutan =

Television was introduced to Bhutan in 1999. It is considered that the country was the last in the world to introduce television. Before BBS set up its own service per royal decree, there were limited television sets picking up Doordarshan and BTV broadcasts via overspill from India and Bangladesh, but the ownership of television sets was banned per a 1989 ruling.

When television was introduced, it led to a widespread cultural shift among Bhutanese. As of 2026, BBS owns three television channels, BBS 1, BBS 2 and BBS 3. Cable television services also exist, but the channel lineups are regulated by BICMA. It is up to them to decide what content is allowed on such companies.

== History ==
In the 1980s, Bhutanese residents who had a television set were able to pick up signals from Doordarshan and Bangladesh Television via spillover, with the signal being blocked by the mountains in the southern lowlands. The emergence of satellite television also led to the installation of some dishes, but these were outlawed in 1989, alongside television sets, per a ruling that it undermined Bhutan's "rich cultural heritage", until BBS would start a service of its own. Despite the ban, a few television sets (mostly black and white) were still in use in Bhutan, receiving overspill signals of both DD National and DD Metro. Viewers with television were enticed by the feature films and cartoons broadcast on the two channels; when DD premiered Shaktimaan in 1997, the series gained a small footing in Bhutan. There was also interest in bootleg copies of Indian movies, mostly in Hindi, and, less frequently, English language movies from the western world, which families bought from video stores.

A pilot project took place on the night of the 1998 FIFA World Cup final (won by France) in the city of Thimphu, after which BBS was given the go-ahead to legalize national television. The service was set to launch the following year, coinciding with the twenty-fifth anniversary of the coronation of King Jing Singye Wangchuk. In order to bring television sets into households, living rooms had to be rearranged.

BBS Television started broadcasting in the Thimphu area on 2 June 1999, being switched on with the help of a consultant from Hong Kong. It initially was a limited service with no fixed opening time, usually it started at 7pm, sometimes as late as 9pm. BBS justified the lack of airtime due to a lack of staff skilled for television, as the staff came from radio.

Simultaneously with the launch of BBS Television came a new phenomenon that impacted the local society, cable television. One of the first such cable companies was Sigma Cable Company, owned by Rinzy Dorji, profiled by Frontline World in 2002 as "Bhutan's Cable Guy". As of December 2000, Sigma carried over 45 channels, most of the feeds came from India, and had 1,300 subscribers. He viewed television, especially cable television, as a priority for Bhutanese households, compared to cinema: the only movie theatre in Thimphu at the time mainly screened Bollywood movies. By 2002, Sigma had over 4,000 subscribers, employed 22 people and planned to convert to a fiber-optic service. Movie and sports channels were populat, according to Dorji. Cable companies were facing problems with rate hikes from the Indian companies and the Information Ministry was planning a draft with the government of Singapore in 2001.

A 2003 study by the Information Ministry said that television broadened viewers' minds, with 66% of respondents saying that it had a positive impact, while only 7,3% were against it. The introduction of television, coupled with another phenomenon of Bhutan in the 2000s, the migration of impoverished people into Thimphu looking to improve their lives, but often without getting a job, led to an uptick in crime. Moreover, television channels were banned for programming that would corrupt Bhutanese cultural norms: Ten Sports was banned over its WWE coverage and Fashion TV and MTV were banned for harming the youth.

On 20 February 2006, BBS Television started nationwide satellite broadcasts. BBS 2 launched in early 2012, initially using BBS 1's frequencies.

In September 2017, BICMA approved a shortlisted 56-channel line-up for usage on all cable companies. At the time, some dzongkhags offered as much as 80 channels and others only 15. Other channels were removed on the grounds of containing "negative content", as well as news and children's channels where 90% or more of the total programming was in either Hindi or Tamil. There was the provision of adding more channels to the list over time.
