= Censorship in Bhutan =

Censorship in Bhutan refers to the way in which the Government of Bhutan controls information within its borders. There are no laws that either guarantee citizens' right to information or explicitly structure a censorship scheme. However, censorship in Bhutan is still conducted by restrictions on the ownership of media outlets, licensing of journalists, and the blocking of websites.

== Public criticism of the government ==
Through 2008, individuals were able to criticize the government publicly; however, the government did at times attempt to impede criticism and monitor political meetings.

== Controls over media ==
Bhutan has one government majority-owned newspaper, the Kuensel, five private newspapers, several magazines, and three internet service providers. In May 2007, the government proposed controls on advertising; after many unfavorable newspaper editorials, the government withdrew the proposal. Through 2008, newspapers operated freely and published stories critical of the government. Foreign newspapers and magazines were also available.

Bhutan also has three private FM radio stations. Through 2008, the government allowed foreign broadcasts and did not censor broadcast content. Private radio and television stations were active and expressed a variety of views, although the government may have limited the number of television channels available. International organizations maintained that the cable costs were often more prohibitive than government restrictions.

During the visit of the Indian Prime Minister Manmohan Singh to Bhutan in May 2008, only journalists from the Bhutan Broadcasting Service and Kuensel were permitted to attend the function. Officials responded only to journalists from the government media or 'authorized' private media.

Media sources suggested that while there is commitment at the highest levels to provide the media with information, some media professionals continued to find it difficult to get access to information from bureaucrats and public officials, especially on issues of corruption and violations of the law. Bhutan does not yet have any legislation guaranteeing the citizens' right to information.

== Censorship on the Internet ==
Individuals and groups are generally permitted to engage in peaceful expression of views via the Internet. Government officials state that the government does not block access, restrict content, or censor Web sites. However, Freedom House reports the government occasionally blocks access to Web sites containing pornography or information deemed offensive to the state; but that such blocked information typically does not extend to political content. In its Freedom of the Press 2012 report, Freedom House described high levels of self-censorship among media practitioners, despite few reports of official intimidation or threats.

The constitution provides for freedom of speech including for members of the press, and the government generally respects these rights in practice. Citizens can publicly and privately criticize the government without reprisal. The constitution states that persons "shall not be subjected to arbitrary or unlawful interference with his or her privacy, family, home, or correspondence, nor to unlawful attacks on the person’s honor and reputation," and the government generally respects these prohibitions.

The official forums of Kuensel online allow open criticism of the government though the forums are moderated, and anyone can post from an Internet café. The forums of news portals such as U.S.-based The Bhutan Times (unrelated to the Bhutan Times newspaper) are much less moderated. The website was temporarily blocked by BICMA, Bhutan's media regulatory body, in 2007. Government officials said forum discussions on bhutantimes.com were too critical of Minister Sangey Nidup, maternal uncle of the king. In August 2007, bhutantimes.com reported that the government lifted its block on service within the country.

BICMA's censorship pattern appears to reflect individual sensitivities of people who may have been discussed online.

== Censorship of the Press in Bhutan ==
Journalists in Bhutan face very little freedom of the media. They are faced with criminal charges just for posts on their personal Facebook accounts. From 2016 to 2018, there have been two new cases regarding the prosecution of journalists who posted on their personal Facebook accounts about property disputes and child mistreatment. While the facts of these two incidents happened to be true, they both were still sentenced to 3 months in prison and required to pay a heavy fine. Bhutan government officials have enacted new laws that restricts what can be shared on social media. While the constitution in Bhutan guarantees freedom of speech, civil servants, such as journalists, are denied this right because of a law that states, "A civil servant shall not critique his agency and the Royal Government,". Bhutan is praised for its high level of "gross domestic happiness" but its people are beginning to face increasingly strict censorship in the media.

== Laws ==
Modernly, Bhutan has regulated its domestic media since enactment of the Bhutan Information Communications and Media Act in July 2006. It created an independent body, the Bhutan Information Communications and Media Authority (BICMA), which was formerly a part of the Ministry for Information and Communications. BICMA is responsible for regulating communications, their technology, and their means in Bhutan

The Act provides for considerable discretion, including that consideration be given to "peace, stability and well-being" in taking over communications services and facilities, intercepting communications, regulatory rulemaking, issuing permits to publish materials, show films, and perform dramas, blocking access to protest websites, and banning certain foreign publications in the national interest. The Act further provides penalties for failure to comply with prohibitory orders by BICMA, and empowers the government to enter private property to search and seize when the agency "reasonably suspects" regulatory violations.

According to Freedom House's 2010 annual report, the media law adopted in 2006 led to the establishment of two independent radio stations, but did not provide specific protections for journalists or guarantee freedom of information. Two independent weeklies and the state-owned newspaper generally published articles favorable to the government and covered criticism of the government only occasionally.

The older National Security Act is a series of sixteen articles enacted by Parliament on November 2, 1992. Several of its provisions prohibit criticism of the king and the political system. The Act punishes those who undermine or attempt to undermine Bhutan's security by creating or inciting "hatred and disaffection," including by speech, with imprisonment for up to ten years. Speech and other acts that create "misunderstanding or hostility between the government and people of Bhutan and the Government and people of any foreign country" are punishable by up to five years' imprisonment.

Furthermore, the Act allows up to three years' imprisonment for those who speak or act to promote or attempt to promote "feelings of enmity or hatred between different religious, racial or language groups or castes and communities, or commits any act which is prejudicial to the maintenance of harmony between different religious, racial or language groups or castes or communities, and which disturbs or is likely to disturb the public tranquility." As such, the Act criminalizes hate speech and propaganda harmful to foreign relations. In practice, some criticism of the government was allowed, including critical postings on government Web sites.

Certain other pieces of Bhutanese legislation provide for content-based restrictions on speech. For example, the Tobacco Control Act of 2010 makes depictions of tobacco use in motion media other than for health promotion constitute a petty misdemeanor.

== See also ==
- Human rights in Bhutan
