= HIV/AIDS in Bhutan =

HIV/AIDS in Bhutan remains a relatively rare disease among its population. It has, however, grown into an issue of national concern since Bhutan's first reported case in 1993. Despite preemptive education and counseling efforts, the number of reported HIV/AIDS cases has climbed since the early 1990s. This prompted increased government efforts to confront the spread of the disease through mainstreaming sexually transmitted disease (STD) and HIV prevention, grassroots education, and the personal involvement of the Bhutanese royal family in the person of Queen Mother Sangay Choden.

== Infection rates and patterns ==
As at November 2019, UNAIDS Bhutan country progress report stated that Bhutan had 687 cumulative reported HIV cases between 1993 to November 2019 with about 522 people living with HIV in the country at that time.

In 2011, there were 246 reported cases of HIV in Bhutan, representing just over 0.03% of the population. In July 2010, there were a total of 217 cases detected, however Health Ministry sources indicated actual numbers were estimated at more than 500 by UNAIDS. Infection rates had remained modest though increasing, climbing from 185 reported cases, or 0.026% of the population, in early 2010. The Ministry of Health attributed climbing numbers to promiscuity, drug use, and the prevalence of HIV/AIDS in neighbouring countries. In 2010, almost 91% of HIV infections among Bhutanese were attributed to multiple partners and lack of condom use. As of 2010, Bhutan had not implemented any needle and syringe programs.

Persons living with HIV/AIDS in Bhutan include all social groups, including government employees, businessmen, farmers, soldiers, monks, sex workers and housewives. In 2010, housewives presented 61 of 217 known cases, while sex workers presented 10. Persons between the ages of 15 and 29 accounted for half of those reportedly living with HIV/AIDS in 2010. In Bhutan, HIV/AIDS is detections come about primarily through contact tracing and routine medical checks. Urban areas such as Thimphu, home to bars, karaoke, discos, and hotels, show the greatest propensity for the spread of HIV/AIDS. Kuensel estimated there were some 266 sex workers in Thimphu alone.

Through 2010, 40 people died due to HIV/AIDS-related causes, and one committed suicide.

== Treatment ==
HIV/AIDS treatment and counseling are available exclusively under the Bhutanese universal health care system. In 2010, 46 of the known 217 living with HIV/AIDS were receiving treatment. Issues of treatment, counseling, and behavioral compliance among HIV-positive persons have become a matter of public debate. Unlike most of its neighbors, Bhutan has never conducted any serological or behavioral surveillance of its at-risk populations.

Persons living with HIV/AIDS in Bhutan carry a social stigma and often face discrimination, including disowning and unemployment, because it is a sexually transmitted disease. Despite the prevalence of promiscuity in Bhutanese society, those infected often remain silent for fear discrimination in an otherwise conservative society. Both the government and media in Bhutan have recognized the need to address social stigma, which hampers prevention, by educating and counseling the general population.

Lhak-sam, a non-governmental organization, was founded in Thimphu in 2009 by HIV-positive Bhutanese to further education and prevention of HIV/AIDS. A large number of its members are unemployed.

== History ==
Although there were no reported cases of acquired immune deficiency syndrome (AIDS) through the early 1990s, the Department of Public Health set up a public awareness program in 1987. With the encouragement of the WHO, a "reference laboratory" was established at the Thimphu General Hospital to test for AIDS and human immunodeficiency virus (HIV) as a precautionary measure. To further enhance awareness, representatives of the National Institute of Family Health were sent to Bangladesh in 1990 for training in AIDS awareness and treatment measures.

Bhutan's first HIV/AIDS case was detected in 1993. In 1999, Queen Mother Sangay Choden assumed the Bhutanese UNFPA ambassadorship, and has been Bhutan's most visible public education campaigner on HIV/AIDS. She has given numerous presentations at public gatherings, at schools and to dropouts, to the military, at monasteries, and in rural communities. The Queen is also responsible for Bhutan's observance of World AIDS Day.

On 24 May 2004, the Fourth Druk Gyalpo, King Jigme Singye Wangchuck, promulgated the Royal Decree on HIV Prevention. In it, he called for citizens to participate in HIV prevention while respecting the rights of those living with HIV/AIDS. This was followed by another Royal Edict in 2004 on HIV/AIDS. Before ascending the throne, future Fifth Druk Gyalpo Jigme Khesar Namgyal Wangchuck advocated abstinence by rejecting "undesirable activities" and demonstrate compassion to those living with the disease.

== See also ==
- Health in Bhutan
- HIV/AIDS in Asia
