= Tobacco Control Act of Bhutan 2010 =

2010 Bhutanese law banning all production and selling of tobacco and its products

Tobacco Control Act of Bhutan, 2010

Parliament of Bhutan
- Enacted: 6 June 2010
- Signed by: Jigme Khesar Namgyel Wangchuck
- Commenced: 16 June 2010
- Status: Current legislation

The Tobacco Control Act of Bhutan (Dzongkha: འབྲུག་གི་ཏམ་ཁུ་དམ་འཛིན་བཅའ་ཁྲིམས་ཅན་མ་, romanized: 'Drug-gi tam-khu dam-'dzin bca'-khrims can-ma) was enacted by the Parliament of Bhutan on 6 June 2010 and came into force on 16 June. (Note: Tobacco Control Act (TCA): § 1) It regulates tobacco and tobacco products, banning the cultivation, harvesting, production, and sale of tobacco and tobacco products in Bhutan. The act also mandates that the government of Bhutan provide counselling and treatment to facilitate tobacco cessation. Premised on the physical health and well being of the Bhutanese people – important elements of Gross National Happiness – the Tobacco Control Act recognizes the harmful effects of tobacco consumption and exposure to tobacco smoke on both spiritual and social health. (Note: TCA: Preamble)

Long before the enactment of the Tobacco Control Act, Bhutan's government had struggled against tobacco use. In 1916, the first King of Bhutan Ugyen Wangchuck promulgated a ban on the "most filthy and noxious herb, called tobacco." The modern Tobacco Control Act, however, led to controversy because of its harsh penalties. In January 2012, Parliament passed urgent amendments with the effect of greatly increasing permissible amounts of tobacco and reducing penalties, although sale and distribution remain prohibited.

In July 2021, Parliament made amendments to the Tobacco Control Act to legalize the import, sale and purchase of tobacco and tobacco products with the interim measures effective as of 2 July 2021 limiting retail sales to authorized micro general shops and groceries.

== No-smoking laws ==
The consumption of tobacco is not altogether prohibited in Bhutan, though it is largely banned in places of public accommodation. The act largely targets smoking in particular, though any form of tobacco is subject to the act. The Tobacco Control Act establishes non-smoking areas: commercial centers including markets, hotel lobbies, restaurants, and bars; recreation centers such as discothèques, cinemas, and playing fields; institutions and offices, both public and private; public gatherings and public spaces such as festivals, taxi stands, and the airport; all public transportation; and any other places declared by the Tobacco Control Board. (Note: TCA: § 3) The board also has the authority to designate smoking areas in public. (Note: TCA: § 26(b)) Smoking areas are permitted in non-public areas of hotels (i.e., smoking floors or smoking rooms) at the discretion of the patron. (Note: TCA: § 9)

The act imposes a duty on persons in charge of these areas of public accommodation to display signs prohibiting smoking, demand smokers cease, report offenders who refuse to the police, and comply with inspections. (Note: TCA: §§ 4–8)

== Trade and commerce of tobacco products ==
The act prohibits the cultivation, harvest, manufacture, supply, and distribution of tobacco, as well as the manufacture, supply, distribution, sale, and purchase of tobacco products within Bhutan. (Note: TCA: § 11)

The act allows individuals to import tobacco and tobacco products for personal consumption according to limits set by the Tobacco Control Board subject to duties and taxes. Those who bring their own tobacco or tobacco products into Bhutan must bear proof of taxation, may only bring goods that display required health warnings, and must not bring goods that promote tobacco by means that are false, misleading, or likely to create an erroneous impression about its characteristics, health effects, or hazards (Note: TCA: §§ 12–17) (cf. descriptors such as "light" or "mild").

The act thoroughly prohibits tobacco advertisement, promotion and sponsorship, restricting the appearance of tobacco in domestic videos and movies to educational clips produced for the purpose of health promotion. (Note: TCA: §§ 18–19)

The act's chapter on "Educational Measures" authorizes the government of Bhutan to form agencies in order to promote health awareness, prevent smoking in non-smokers, and strategize tobacco control. In conjunction, the act also authorizes programs for government research and surveillance of tobacco use. (Note: TCA: §§ 20–21)

== Enforcement agencies ==
The Tobacco Control Act establishes two new government institutions to regulate tobacco use in Bhutan: the Tobacco Control Board and the Tobacco Control Office. The members of both the Board and the Office serve concurrently in government anti-narcotics offices.

The Tobacco Control Board is the same body as the preexisting Bhutan Narcotic Control Board, now charged with regulating tobacco and enforcing that regulation under the act. The board provides guidance and direction to the Tobacco Control Office and other law enforcement agencies regarding tobacco law enforcement and is permitted to propose amendments to parliament on the Tobacco Control Act itself. (Note: TCA: §§ 24–27) Any amendments to the act must be approved by a simple majority in both the National Council and National Assembly, or by at least two-thirds of a quorum of parliament, and the amendments must not undermine the Bhutan Narcotic Control Agency. (Note: TCA: § 59)

The act mandates the Tobacco Control Board, through the Tobacco Control Office, to provide cessation programs in health facilities and to work with rehabilitation centers in diagnosing and counseling tobacco dependence. As of 2022, Bhutan operated a toll-free quitline; nicotine replacement therapy, bupropion and varenicline were not legally sold, while cessation support was available in most primary care facilities and in some hospitals.To this end, the act authorizes the government to facilitate affordable access to treatment, including pharmaceutical products. (Note: TCA: §§ 22–23) The act further provides a procedural framework for the functioning of the board. (Note: TCA: § 28)

The Tobacco Control Office is occupied by the Bhutan Narcotic Control Agency and headed by its executive director. The office acts as the agent of the board responsible for coordinating most of the actual implementation of Bhutan's tobacco policy. (Note: TCA: §§ 29–32)

The act tasks other government institutions and agencies with implementing its terms and the rules promulgated by the Tobacco Control Board. The Ministry of Health, Ministry of Economic Affairs, Ministry of Finance, Ministry of Education, and Ministry of Home and Cultural Affairs are all responsible for implementing the laws in the act and the policies of the board in specified arenas. (Note: TCA: §§ 33–37, 42) Ancillary government institutions, such as the Royal Bhutan Police, the Civil Society Organization, and the Road Safety and Transport Authority are also authorized with enforcement and coordinating awareness on tobacco control. (Note: TCA: §§ 38, 40–42) Likewise, local-level Thromdes (municipal governments) are also to coordinate and conduct awareness programs on tobacco control. (Note: TCA: § 39)

== Enforcement laws ==
The act also provides a substantive and procedural framework for enforcement by authorized officers of the above government bodies. (Note: TCA: §§ 42–46) If officers believe there is tobacco within, they are authorized to enter and inspect public and business places, and any place pursuant to a search warrant, at any reasonable time. They are also authorized to stop and inspect vehicles on the road and examine containers at checkpoints if they believe tobacco is inside. Officers may also demand proof of tax and duty payment at any reasonable time. According to regulations established by the board, officers are also empowered to confiscate and destroy contraband. (Note: TCA: § 43) The powers of confiscation, search and seizure are subject to the provisions of the Penal Code and the Civil and Criminal Codes. (Note: TCA: §§ 44–45)

The act lists eight new offenses and corresponding penalties, ranging from fines for smoking in non-smoking areas to fourth-degree (lowest degree) felony charges for smuggling. Fourth-degree felonies are punishable by imprisonment for three to five years. Anyone in possession of more tobacco than the import limit is guilty (strictly liable) of smuggling. Those caught selling tobacco in Bhutan receive reduced sentences if their crime is mitigated by disclosing the tobacco's source to authorities. (Note: TCA: §§ 47–54)

In addition, depictions of tobacco use in motion media other than for health promotion constitute a petty misdemeanor; as such, the act also provides for a content-based restriction on speech.

== Enforcement practices and controversy ==
In practice, enforcement resulted in some high-profile cases, however at least one citizen has complained publicly that enforcement is spotty and arbitrary. Another has come forth to highlight the disparate treatment among classes and of tobacco among other addictive habits widespread in Bhutan such as ara, doma, ema datshi and phak sha sikam, and to decry that tobacco possession in Bhutan could be punished with the same sentence as for rape of the elderly.

In the first major prosecution under the act, a 23-year-old ordained monk named Sonam Tshering from Langpa in Haa was caught on January 24, 2011, with 480 grams of chewing tobacco (purchased for Nu.120) en route from Phuentsholing to Thimphu. This was the first such prosecution under the Tobacco Control Act. A private individual informed the police that Tshering possessed tobacco. Under current customs schedules, a tax of 100 per cent was levied on tobacco from India, and 200 per cent on tobacco from all other countries of origin, with a maximum of 150 grams of tobacco per month. Although Tshering revealed the source of his tobacco, to mitigate and qualify his offence as a misdemeanor, he failed to identify the location and supplier of the tobacco, apparently somewhere in the border town of Jaigaon. He was thus convicted of a felony, whose minimum sentence is three years. Although the Constitution of Bhutan guarantees all persons the right to be represented by a jabmi (attorney), the Thimphu District Court closed the case before any jabmi offered his services. The court convicted Tshering of smuggling and sentenced him for smuggling under the Tobacco Control Act.

In the ensuing controversy, the Prime Minister of Bhutan Lyonpo Jigme Thinley issued statements that Tshering's case had been "blown out of proportion," while sympathizing with those who felt the severity of the sentence was incongruent to the offense committed. The prime minister pointed out that the legislation was a product of Bhutan's modern bicameral parliamentary and democratic process, having been debated in both the National Assembly and National Council, and assented by the Royal Government. With the truism that no law is perfect, he invited the public to amend the Tobacco Control Act peacefully under the new Bhutanese democratic process. Sonam Tshering has since appealed the District Court ruling to the High Court of Bhutan, for which he has retained a private attorney. The Bhutan Observer editor has questioned the constitutionality of the Tobacco Control Act and its enforcement in view of the harshness of the sentence.

In early March 2011, a high-profile incident at Paro Airport resulted in the arrests of a Royal Bhutan Army constable, officer and aircraft engineer allegedly involved in importing a carton of 555 cigarettes without paying tax at the Paro Airport. Constable Tshering Jamtsho and Captain Sonam Tshewang were officially handed over to police by the Royal Bhutan Army, while police arrested aircraft engineer Chogyal Gyeltshen separately. Customs agents had caught Constable Jamtsho with some 200 cigarettes. Jamtsho alleged they were purchased by the aircraft engineer for a Major Karma Dorji. The Bhutanese Customs authorities investigated the affair for 51 hours before issuing arrest warrants; the further investigation was begun by the Royal Bhutan Police, however the police expressed their refusal to investigate the matter until it was referred to them, despite the legal requirement that matters be brought to the attention of the police within 24 hours. Because the arrests were not immediate, the affair is somewhat controversial.

Less than two days later, on March 7, 2011, another tip-off at Paro Airport resulted in the arrest of two female keepers of different shops in possession of about 200 cigarettes (nineteen packets) and eleven packets of chewing tobacco ("baba") in total. Upon arrest and interrogation of the first shopkeeper, police learned her source was the second; the second disclosed her source to police. On that information, police arrested a 39-year-old bus driver at the Chunzom checkpost. Throughout 2011, there were several more tobacco-related arrests at Chunzom, including that of an 81-year-old man.

In late March 2011, another arrest in Phuentsholing, a major border town, allegedly produced a network of apparently unwitting transporters of tobacco products worth Nu.45,000 in a consignment passing through Jaigaon. The activities were traced to a businesswoman based in Thimphu.

The controversy over the tobacco laws and the reach of government touched even the Bhutanese media. In late March 2011, the Royal Bhutan Police sued a 28-year-old former employee of the Bhutan Media Service in Thimphu for spreading rumours that police had raided one of the media houses earlier in March 2011 on a tobacco-related pretext. The rumour was characterized as a joke and a hoax. According to police, the accused had confessed to spreading unfounded rumours that the police had visited Bhutan Media Services offices warning them not to smoke, and that employees would be arrested if caught. This provoked public outrage, prompting outcries in news opinion columns. Police, through Kuensel, stated that "police was referred to as blue dogs encroaching into private space and waiting for crime to happen. We were blamed for no reason and encroaching is a strong word." The incident resulted in the termination of the employee.

Although some Bhutanese have decried the Tobacco Control Act as draconian, the subject has remained open to debate. Members of Parliament report variously that they have received no input or that their constituents hold a favorable opinion of the law. Most vigorous debate continues in urban areas. The Bhutanese public seems convinced, however, that threats to health and happiness from tobacco pale in comparison to those posed by alcohol and drugs. Members of local and national governments have generally supported the Tobacco Control Act as it was enacted and opposed any amendments, especially before the expiration of a mandatory one-year waiting period.

== Amendment ==
On 4 September 2011, Prime Minister Jigme Thinley stated at a press conference that his government would act swiftly to enact an amendment to the Tobacco Control Act. The prime minister explained the decision was based on the "pain and the suffering" the act had caused after some 59 arrests, adding that his government would consult with the National Council to ensure its presentation during the next legislative session. In reaction, semi-nomadic communities in Merak and Sakteng along the porous Indian border near Arunachal Pradesh expressed vocal support for the status quo, or even strengthening its provisions, due to the negative impacts of the illicit tobacco trade among their populations.

In January 2012, Health Minister Lyonpo Zangley Drukpa brought the amendment to debate in the National Assembly. Considered urgent legislation, the bill was taken up by a joint committee of National Assembly and National Council MPs, and passed with nearly unanimous support. As proposed by the National Council, the amendment would have lifted the ban on tobacco sale and distribution within Bhutan, though production would have remained prohibited. At its passage, however, the amendment retained the prohibition on sale and distribution.

Under the amendment, possession limits were increased, and penalties were decreased. The permissible quantity of individual cigarettes was changed from 200 to 300; individual beedis from 200 to 400; individual cigars from thirty to fifty; and other tobacco products raised from 50 to 150 grams (1.8 to 5.3 oz). Penalties were also regraded, with possession of less than three times the limit defined as a petty misdemeanor; possession of over three but under four times the limit a misdemeanor; and fourth degree felony reserved for possession of four times the limit.

== Tobacco use statistics in Bhutan ==
The 2023 WHO report on the global tobacco epidemic indicates that the adult daily smoking prevalence in 2021 of Bhutan was 4%. This meant that Bhutan was the country with the lowest recorded prevalence of tobacco use in the South-East Asia Region.The 2019 STEPS survey reported an adult (15–69 years) current tobacco smoking prevalence of 10.6% overall (men 15.2%, women 3.7%), and the 2019 Global Youth Tobacco Survey found current smoking among adolescents aged 13–15 at 17.3% (boys 25.4%, girls 9.5%).

== See also ==
- Health in Bhutan
- Bhutanese legislation
- Law enforcement in Bhutan
- Censorship in Bhutan
- Politics of Bhutan
- Smoking ban
- Prevalence of tobacco use
