= National Order of Merit (Bhutan) =

National Order of Bhutan

Awarded by His Majesty The King Of Bhutan
- Type: Order
- Awarded for: distinguished and meritorious services to the state
- Status: Currently constituted
- Sovereign: Jigme Khesar Namgyel Wangchuck
- Grades: First Class; Second Class; Third Class

Precedence
- Next (higher): Royal Order of Bhutan
- Next (lower): Order of the Beloved Son of the Dragon
- Ribbon bar of the order

The National Order of Merit was founded by King Jigme Khesar Namgyal Wangchuck on 7 November 2008, as reward for distinguished and meritorious services to the state.

== Award ==
It is awarded as reward for distinguished and meritorious services to the state.

== Ranks ==
It is composed of three classes :

- First Class - a chest medal in gold.
- Second Class - a chest medal in silver.
- Third Class - a chest medal in bronze.

== Insignia ==
The badge of the medal is a medallion with right-profile image of the King, inside an eight-petals stylised flower, itself inside an eight-pointed stylised star, simply hanging from a ribbon. The whole medal is in gold, silver or bronze, according to the rank.

The ribbon of the medal is dark orange with lighter orange borders

== Notable recipients ==
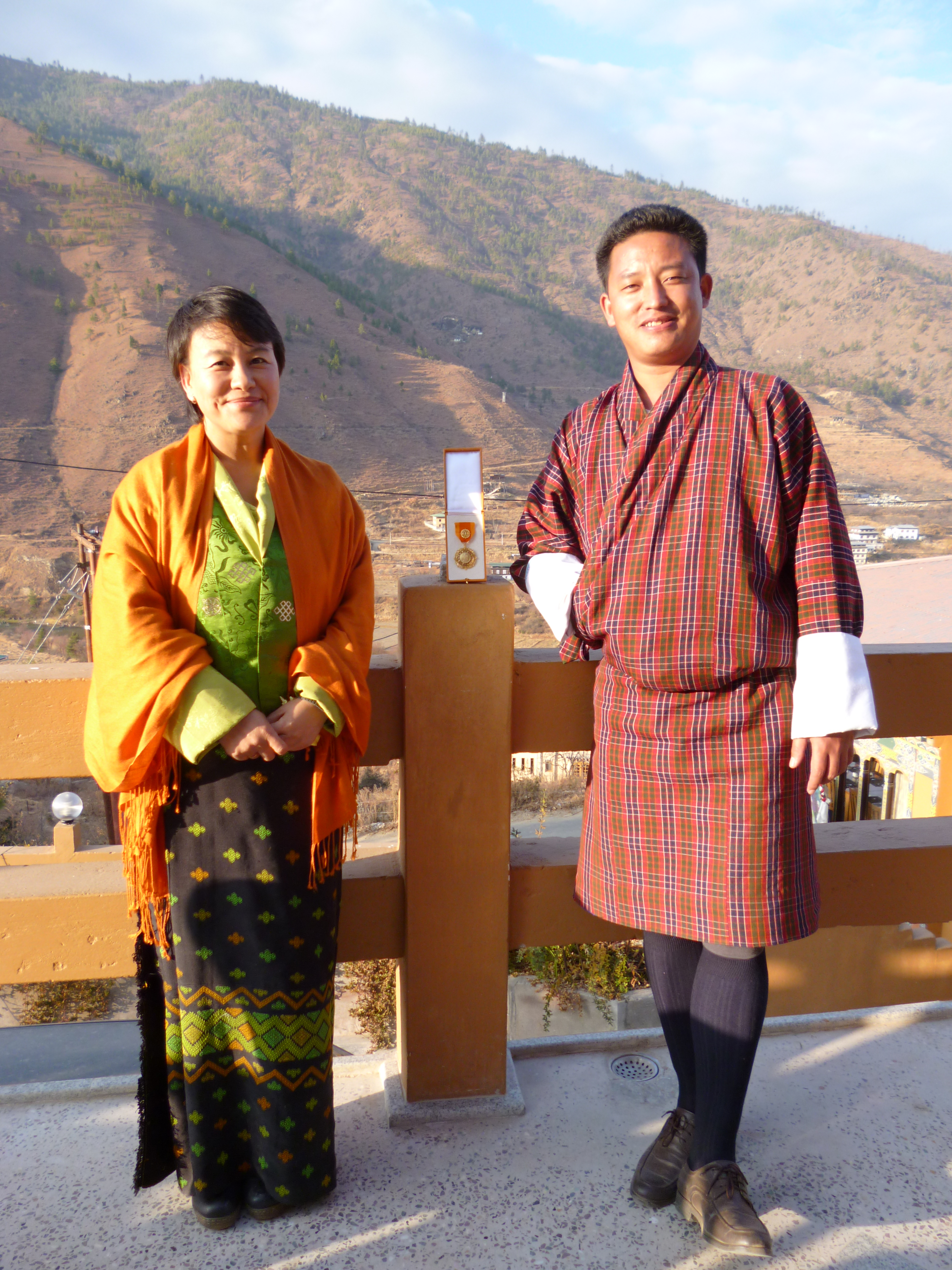
- Phuntso Wangmo, CEO, and Needrup Zangpo, Editor in Chief, of Bhutan Observer with their National Order of Merit, awarded by His Majesty Jigme Khesar Namgyel Wangchuck, in December, 2011.
- Business Bhutan, Bhutan's first business newspaper [in Gold] (17 December 2011).
- Bhutan Observer, Bhutan's first private bilingual newspaper [in Gold] (17 December 2011).
- Sonam Kinga, Chairperson of National Council (current position), Actor and Researcher at the Center for Bhutan Studies [in Gold] (17 December 2014).
- Harald Nestroy, Ambassador and Chairman of the society Pro Bhutan (17 December 2015).
- Sanduk Ruit, Doctor, eye surgeon (17 December 2015).
- Royal Textile Academy of Bhutan [in Gold] (17 December 2016).
- Chablop Passang Tshering (17 December 2016).
- VAST Bhutan (17 December 2016).
- Toeb Karma (17 December 2021).
- Bhutan Association of Women Entrepreneurs, whose founder and president is Damchae Dem (17 December 2016).
- Bhutan Red Cross Society (BRCS) (17 December 2021).
- Poonam Khetrapal Singh [in Gold] (17 December 2023).
- Chencho Gyeltshen [in Gold] (17 December 2023).
