= Zimbiri =

Bhutanese artist

- Born: 1991 (age 34–35); Thimphu, Bhutan
- Occupations: Painter and artist

Zimbiri (born 1991) is a painter and contemporary artist from Bhutan. She was the first woman to have a solo art exhibition in Bhutan. Inspired by writers such as Shel Silverstein and William Blake, as well as minimalism and Bhutanese culture, she is a leading figure in Bhutan's contemporary art scene.

== Biography ==
Born in 1991 in Thimpu, Zimbiri grew up in Bhutan. She has a degree in Fine Art and Economics from Wheaton College, USA. Her first show, Faces, was the first solo contemporary art exhibition by a woman to be held in Bhutan. Held in 2015, the series was inspired by Shel Silverstein's poem Everything on It. She has exhibited her work in Taipei, at the Royal Textile Academy of Bhutan, and in 2020 Grosvenor Gallery in London was the first institution to show her work in Britain. There she exhibited work as part of Asian Art in London, showing part of her body of work inspired by the tiger.

Zimbiri uses traditional Bhutanese materials, such as hand-woven canvases (rhay-shing) and natural paints (saa-tshen). She is inspired by minimalism and colour field painting, as well as Bhutanese culture, from masks to flowers. She has also experimented with producing work as an non-fungible token (NFT). In 2022, her series Imaginary Lines, inspired by the work William Blake, was exhibited at Nature Morte in Vasant Vihar, New Delhi.

== Reception ==
According to Kinley Wangmo, her work is a significant contribution to Bhutanese contemporary art. For Jason Hopper, her work demonstrates "the increased participation of women in contemporary art" in Bhutan. For Ma Padioleau, she is "the leading female artist in Bhutan".
