= Kinley Dorji =

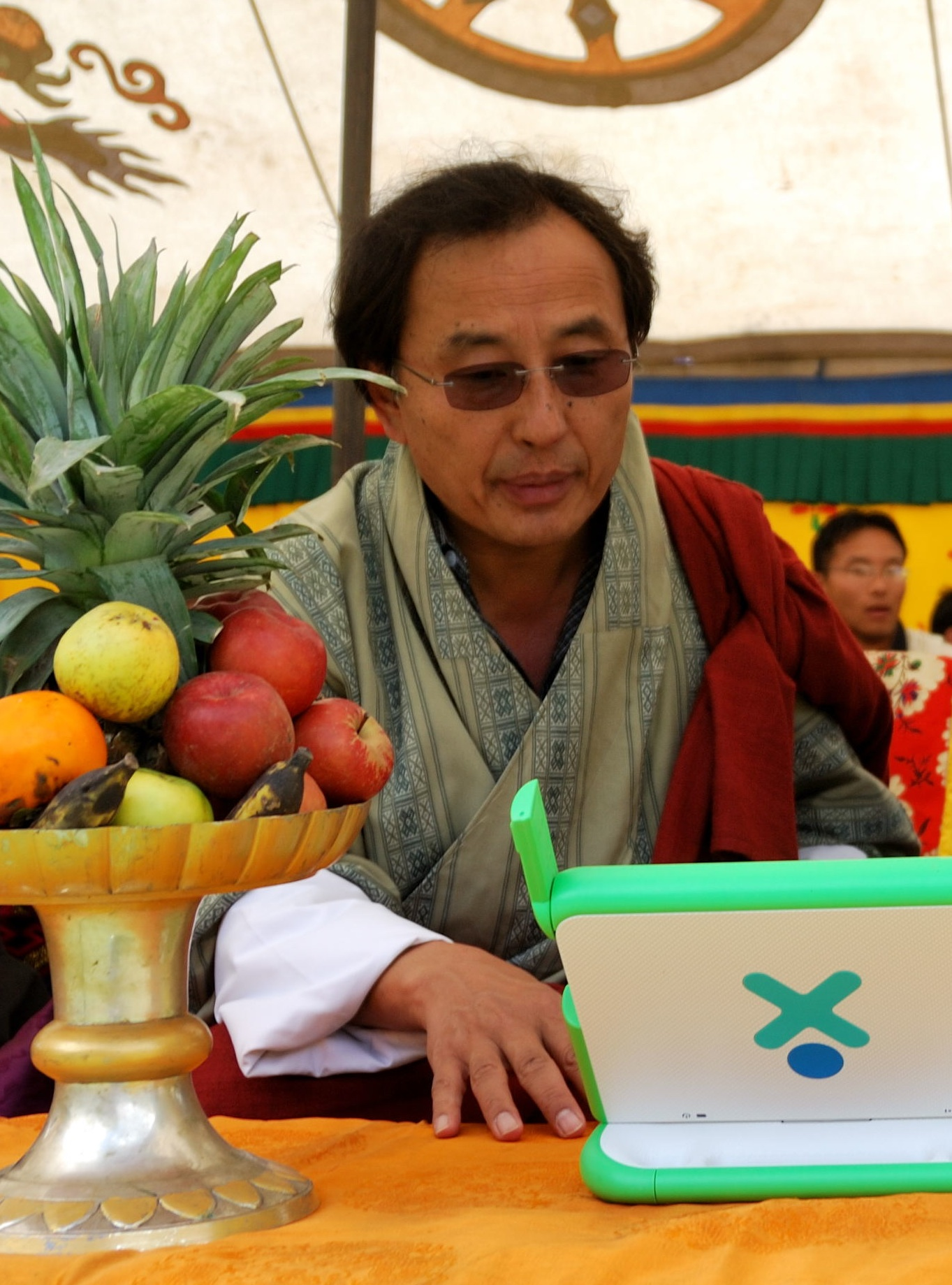
Dasho Kinley Dorji inspecting an OLPC XO-1

Dasho Kinley Dorji (Dzongkha: ཀུན་ལེགས་རྡོ་རྗེ་; Wylie: Kun-legs Rdo-rje) was Bhutan's first trained journalist who became founder, then managing director and editor in chief of Kuensel, Bhutan's national newspaper. In 2009 he became Secretary of the Ministry of Information and Communications, a position he held until 2016.

Dorji was sent to Australia by the Fourth King to study journalism in the 1980s, graduating with a Bachelor of Arts in Communications from Mitchell College, now Charles Sturt University, situated in country Bathurst. He also completed a Master of Journalism at Columbia University in New York, and, in 2007, was awarded a John S. Knight Journalism Fellowship at Stanford University for his development of media in emerging democracies. In 2019 he was awarded an Honorary Doctorate from University of Sydney for his contribution to global journalism.

When Dorji left Kuensel in 2009 to take up his government position, journalist Kencho Wangdi paid homage to his leadership:

His editorial was a staple for a generation of educated Bhutanese and it mirrored, with all its problems, the growth of Bhutan. He walked a fine line between criticism and appeasement of the government and many a time was caught in between...The changes came slowly and cautiously but always forwardly…He was Kuensel’s intellectual conscience...He loathed a sensationally written story, or even a headline. He wrote in one of his editorials: ‘All of us who professionally use the media are the shapers of society. We can vulgarise that society. We can brutalise it. Or we can help lift it to a higher level.

He published Bhutan’s first book on Literary Journalism, titled Within the Realm of Happiness, which includes 13 personal essays on Bhutanese culture.

Dorji has been a strong proponent of Gross National Happiness (GNH) as an alternative for Human Development.

He lives in Thimphu with his three children and wife, Siok San Pek-Dorji, the founding executive director of Bhutan Centre for Media and Democracy. Now retired, Kinley maintains many roles in the community, including editor-in-chief of Druk Journal, director of the Bhutan Trust Fund Board, director of the Youth Development Fund Board, a member of the UNESCO National Commission, and a member of the Council of Royal University of Bhutan.

On 9 December 2006, Dorji was awarded the prestigious Royal Red Scarf by the Fourth King, the Bhutanese equivalent of a knighthood, which conferred on him the title Dasho (Sir).

On, 17 December 2025, Dorji was awarded the prestigious Royal Order of Bhutan by the King Jigme Khesar Namgyel Wangchuck, for his pioneering role in journalism and contributions to media, governance, and Gross National Happiness.
