= Pema Choden =

Bhutanese diplomat

Pema Choden (born 1965) is a Bhutanese diplomat.

== Biography ==
Choden studied French and international relations at university, including at the École nationale d'administration in France. She joined Bhutan's Ministry of Foreign Affairs in 1989 and has also served as the managing director of Bhutan Broadcasting Service. From 2014 to 2016 Choden was the resident Ambassador of Bhutan to Bangladesh and the Maldives, Pakistan, South Korea and Sri Lanka. She has also held the position of Bhutan's resident Ambassador to Belgium, the European Union, Sweden, the Netherlands, Denmark, Finland and Spain.
