= Namgay Zam =

Bhutanese journalist (born 1985)

- Born: 1985 (age 40–41)
- Education: BA in English literature
- Alma mater: Lady Shri Ram College
- Occupations: Writer and journalist

Namgay Zam (born 1985) is a Bhutanese journalist and activist. Having made her name as a producer and anchor on the public Bhutan Broadcasting Service, she served from 2019 to 2023 as executive director of the Journalists' Association of Bhutan. A 2016 lawsuit against Zam was considered the first test case of the country's press freedoms after its democratic transition.

== Early life and education ==
Namgay Zam was born in 1985 into a Bhutanese family in Bhutan, where she spent her childhood.

She attended university in India at Lady Shri Ram College, a women's college at the University of Delhi, where she graduated with a bachelor's degree in English literature.

== Journalism career ==
Zam began her career with Bhutan's first national youth radio station, Kuzoo FM, in 2007. She then worked as a producer and English-language news anchor for the country's national broadcaster, Bhutan Broadcasting Service. She spent 10 months in 2015 and 2016 as a Humphrey fellow at the Walter Cronkite School of Journalism and Mass Communication at Arizona State University.

In 2017, she was described by The Diplomat as "the most well-known face on television in Bhutan." She has also written articles for English-language publications including the Guardian, the Australian Broadcasting Corporation, and the Hindustan Times.

In addition to her broadcast work and writing, Zam became known for her active presence on social media. In 2016, she was accused of defamation by the influential businessman Sonam Phuntsho, the father-in-law of the country's Chief Justice Tshering Wangchuk, over a post on Facebook in which she shared a petition against the businessman. She described the suit as a "witch hunt" led by Wangchuk.

Zam's case, in which she faced imprisonment or a fine of 2.59 million Bhutanese ngultrum, equivalent to around 10 years' salary for the plaintiff, was described by activists and international media as a first test case of freedom of the press in Bhutan after its democratic transition. Although the suit was withdrawn in January 2017 just before the verdict was to be announced, Zam left Bhutan for Nepal shortly thereafter, and she began working as deputy editor at the Kathmandu-based media startup Onward Nepal. However, she returned to Bhutan from Nepal later that year.

Then, in October 2017, Zam began producing and hosting Bhutan's first mental health radio show, Mind Over Matter Bhutan, on Radio Valley. In 2019, she launched the country's first podcast, Dragon Tales. She now works as an independent journalist in the Bhutanese capital, Thimphu.

In 2019, she became executive director of the Journalists' Association of Bhutan, a role she held until 2023. On her appointment, she identified gender equality in the media as one of her goals as executive director. In this role, she also sought to arrange pro bono legal services for journalists.

== Activism ==
As an activist, Zam has supported various causes including social justice, gender equity and LGBTQ rights, and mental health advocacy. She has been involved in the Bhutan Network for Empowering Women and has worked with various NGOs, including the Bhutan Youth Development Fund, on these causes.
