= Harald Nestroy =

German diplomat

Harald Norbert Nestroy (born 1 February 1938 in Breslau) is a retired German diplomat who was ambassador to Costa Rica, Namibia, Malaysia and the Republic of the Congo. In 1987, he visited Bhutan for the first time, and is the chairman of the society Pro Bhutan. He is also a photographer.

== Life ==
Nestroy graduated from high school in Königstein im Taunus and studied law from 1958 to 1963 at Johannes Gutenberg University Mainz and the Universidad de Barcelona. In 1964 he joined the diplomatic service of the Federal Republic of Germany and was in the attaché training of the Foreign Office in Bonn until 1967. He was political advisor at the German embassy in New Delhi, India (1968–1971), cultural attaché at the German embassy in Bogotá, Colombia (1971–1973), advisor for Central America at the Foreign Office in Bonn (1974–1977), German Ambassador to Brazzaville, People's Republic of Congo, (1979–1982). From 1982 to 1985 he was Consul General in Atlanta, USA, and from 1985 to 1989 German Ambassador to San José, Costa Rica. After heading the France, Benelux, Austria, Switzerland department in the Political Department of the Foreign Office in Bonn from 1989 to 1994, he was German Ambassador to Kuala Lumpur, Malaysia (1994–1998), and Ambassador to Windhoek, Namibia until his retirement in 2003.

Nestroy has been involved in the Kingdom of Bhutan since 1987. In 1992 he founded the non-profit association "Pro Bhutan" and initiated humanitarian projects in the field of general health and the education of disadvantaged children. With a special project, he promoted the preservation of the unique culture of the Kingdom of Bhutan from 2006 to 2010. Nestroy has planned and carried out the following donation-financed projects in Bhutan since 1993:

- Construction of the entire complex of the district hospital in PUNAKHA (1993–2018)
- Construction of a home for girls and boys for blind children in the National Institute for the Disabled, NID, now called the Muenseling Institute in Khaling in eastern Bhutan (2004)
- Construction of four school buildings and two homes for hearing-impaired girls and boys school in the only facility for hearing-impaired children in Drukgel / Paro (2005–2017)
- Reconstruction of the covered, 55 m (180 ft) cantilevered wooden bridge to the holy Dzong (monastery castle) of Punakha in traditional Bhutanese architecture (inauguration 2008)

Nistroy is a student of the well-known Himalayan photographer Jaroslav Poncar and has been involved in photography since 1990. He has published numerous photo series.

Nestroy has been married to Angelika, nee Heinz, since 1999. Groomsmen at the wedding in Bhutan were the then Prime Minister of Bhutan Sangay Ngedup and his wife Rinchhen. Nestroy is a member of the CV fraternity Rheno-Palatia.

== Notable published works ==
- Bhutan (2012). ISBN 9783898232890
- BHUTAN, KINGDOM OF THE THUNNING DRAGON IN THE HIMALAYA, Verlag EDITION PANORAMA, Mannheim

== Honours ==
- Germany :
  - Officer Cross of the Order of Merit of the Federal Republic of Germany (2009).
- Bhutan :
  - King Jigme Khesar Investiture Medal (06/11/2008).
  - Member of the National Order of Merit [in Gold] (17 December 2015).
