= Textiles of Bhutan =

Bhutanese textiles represent a rich and complex repository of a unique art form. They are recognised for their abundance of colour, sophistication and variation of patterns, and the intricate dyeing and weaving techniques. The weavers, who are mostly women, must not be seen merely as creators of wealth but also as the innovators and owners of artistic skills developed and nurtured over centuries.

== History ==
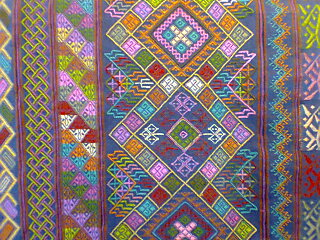
Kushuthara

The history of Bhutanese textiles becomes more evident in the last century. As textile production moved beyond the confines of clothing to artistic expression of individuals and communities, patronage from the royal household was vital. Although the founders of the Wangchuck dynasty are from Bumthang, their ancestral home is in Lhuntse District, which was historically recognised as the home of the most celebrated weavers in the country. The role and influence of royal women in sustaining and furthering the weaving tradition must be acknowledged. The 10th Trongsa Penlop Jigme Namgyal built the Wangducholing Palace in 1857 the loom houses (thagchem) accommodating 30 to 40 weavers, were built around the same time near the palace and existed until the mid 1900s.

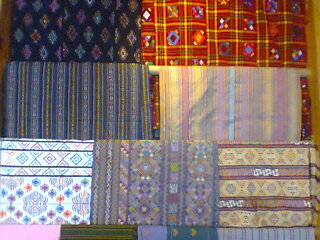
An assortment of textiles from Bhutan

The youngest sister of the second king, Princess Ashi Kencho Wangmo Wangchuck (later a Buddhist nun), is credited to have introduced the horizontal loom from Tibet in the 1930s. Her Majesty the Queen Mother Ashi Sangay Choden Wangchuck continuous to extend royal patronage to the textile industry. Her Majesty's interest and intervention have revitalised Bhutanese textiles, given the industry and impetus within the country and brought world attention to Bhutanese textiles. She is the Royal Patron of the Bhutan Textile Museum and the Chairman of the Royal Textile Academy of Bhutan (RTAB).

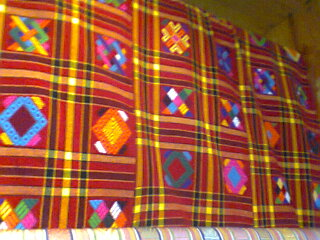
A Bhutanese textile

Today Bhutanese textiles have reached new heights of dynamism and respect; they are valued not only for their economic viability, but also as a symbol of Bhutan's artistic heritage that commands world attention and appreciation.

== Women weavers ==
Ordinary weavers produced fabrics for general use that were of standard quality. The farmers wove only when they were free from agricultural work. It was the royal weavers, thama, in the royal loom houses who were the professionals. Some of the aristocratic and landed households also professional weavers. The all-encompassing use of textiles took it beyond the realm of clothing to the realms of rituals and symbolism, as a form of wealth and commodities for trade and taxation. A well-established system of production, use and exchange linked the communities, extended the threads of interdependence, and wove the very fabric of Bhutanese society.

== Types of patterns ==
=== Plain weaves ===
Plain weave textiles are usually woven in patterns with stripes and plaids.

- Martha: Plaid weave usually with red or maroon as the dominant color.
- Sertha: Plaid weave usually with yellow or orange as the dominant color.
- Thara: Woven only for production of horizontal striped Kira with white as the dominant color.
- Kamtham Jardrima: Striped weave incorporating the colors of the rainbow.

=== Warp pattern weaves ===
Warp is the yarn that runs lengthwise on the loom. The warp pattern designs are characterized by their supplementary warp floating technique that forms bands of repeated motifs on ground. The different warp pattern designs are differentiated with their color schemes. The number of legs or cross hatches in each supplementary warp pattern band is one indicator of the superiority of the textile. The textile is even more priced when the weaver includes weft pattern designs.

- Mentsi Martha: Alternate yellow warp bands with plain weave red ground.
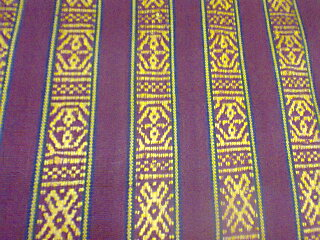
  Mentsi Martha
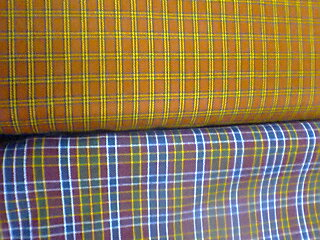
  Sertha (top), Martha (bottom)
- Lungserma: Alternate green red on yellow ground.
- Dromchuchem: Literally means 'with little boxes' pattern bands are woven in threes.
- Mentha: Narrow white warp bands on black ground. It is the one pattern which is worn solely by women.
- Weft: Yarn that is passed back and forth through each shed across the loom and is interwoven with the wrap.

=== Weft pattern weaves ===
Weft patterns are popularly referred to as Sapma continuous weft patterns and Tigma discontinuous weft patterns in Bhutan. The continuous weft patterns are very similar to those featured in other textiles throughout South and Southeast Asia. The weft yarn is inserted between intervals of the warp yarn to create continuous weft patterns. The discontinuous weft pattern motifs resemble embroidery are indigenous to Bhutan. Colored pattern yarns are knotted individually to the weft yarns to create geometric motifs which are usually combination of multiple pattern motifs.

- Sapma: Continuous weft pattern designs.
- Tingma: Discontinuous weft pattern designs. Textile experts often mistake the supplementary weft pattern designs for embroidery as they say it is impossible to weave the brocade patterning on a common back-strap loom.

The sapma and Tingma weft pattern designs are usually used as pattern designs for :

- Ngoshom: Kira with the dark ground usually blue or black.
- Kushuthara: Kira with a white ground.
- Shilochem: Woven both for Gho and Kira, usually woven with alternate rows of wrap pattern bands.
