= Human rights in Bhutan =

Human rights in Bhutan are those outlined in Article 7 of its Constitution. The Royal Government of Bhutan has affirmed its commitment to the "enjoyment of all human rights" as integral to the achievement of 'gross national happiness' (GNH); the unique principle which Bhutan strives for, as opposed to fiscally based measures such as GDP.

In practice, Bhutan's human rights record has received criticism for the treatment of the Lhotshampa people, many of whom became refugees in Nepal, as well as for failure to uphold freedom of religion.

In 2024, Freedom House rated Bhutan's human rights at 63 out 100 (partly free).

== Legal framework ==
=== Rights under the Constitution ===
Bhutan's Constitution was adopted in 2008 and only after that was it transformed from an absolute monarchy to a democratic Constitutional monarchy. Article 7 of the Constitution establishes numerous rights, including "many of the basic human rights enriched in international conventions", which are said to be "essential for development of the human personality and for the full realization of the human potential." "Fundamental rights" established in Article 7 include:

- Life, liberty, and security;
- Freedom of speech;
- Freedom of thought and religion;
- Freedom of the press;
- Freedom of movement and residence within Bhutan;
- Property;
- Freedom of assembly and association;
- Freedom from discrimination on grounds of race, sex, language, religion, politics, or other status.

Other classes of rights protected are labor rights, voting rights, and intellectual property rights. The Constitution also prohibits torture and "cruel, inhuman or degrading treatment or punishment", including capital punishment. The final clauses of Article 7 enshrine a right to privacy with respect to arbitrary or unlawful interference only, protect against arbitrary arrest, and provide a right to legal representation as well as a right to undertake legal proceedings for the enforcement of Article 7 rights. While most rights guaranteed under Article 7 are accorded to "all persons" or people "within Bhutan" some rights are explicitly reserved for Bhutanese citizens, such as freedom of speech, thought, religion, movement, and assembly, as well as rights to information, vote, property, and labor rights.

Article 8 of the Constitution outlines "corresponding fundamental duties". Important provisions include articles 8.3 and 8.5. Article 8.3 states that every Bhutanese citizen is under a duty to "foster tolerance, mutual respect and spirit of brotherhood amongst all the people of Bhutan transcending religious, linguistic, regional or sectional diversities." Article 8.5 states that people should "not tolerate or participate in acts of injury, torture or killing of another person, terrorism, abuse of women, children or any other person and shall take necessary steps to prevent such acts."

=== International obligations ===
Although Bhutan's Constitution was framed to reflect various basic human rights protected by international conventions, Bhutan itself has neither signed nor ratified many key international treaties addressing human rights, including the International Covenant of Civil and Political Rights (ICCPR) and the International Covenant on Economic, Social and Cultural Rights (ICESCR). Bhutan is party to the Convention on the Elimination of All Forms of Discrimination Against Women (CEDAW) and the Convention on the Rights of the Child (CRC), as well as the CRC's first two optional protocols. Bhutan has also signed, though not ratified, the International Convention on the Elimination of All Forms of Racial Discrimination (CERD) and the Convention on the Rights of Persons with Disabilities (CRPD).

Bhutan joined the United Nations in 1971. It has therefore been subject to the Universal Periodic Review (UPR), having gone through two cycles so far; first in 2009 and again in 2014.

=== Gross national happiness ===
In its national report under the first cycle of the UPR, Bhutan's Royal Government asserted that the enjoyment of all human rights is necessary to achieve GNH, "to which it is also deeply committed". GNH was said to establish the "framework for the protection, promotion and integration of human rights into the fabric of Bhutanese society." This connection between GNH and human rights within Bhutan was reaffirmed in its national report under the second cycle, where Bhutan concluded by stating that social and economic rights were "reflected in its developmental concept of GNH."

The concept of GNH was first articulated by Bhutan's fourth king, Jigme Singye Wangchuck, in 1972. The development concept, rather than employing "conventional income-based measures", focuses on the happiness of individuals and the maximisation thereof through an aspirational, spiritual, and cultural lens. GNH has four "pillars". They are:

- The promotion of equitable and sustainable socioeconomic development
- Preservation and promotion of cultural values
- Conservation of the natural environment
- Establishment of good governance

Bhutan's first national report to the UPR explicitly related these pillars to human rights, which it said were embodied within them. The first pillar is said to represent economic rights, ensuring that "present development does not compromise the right to development of future generations... and that every person in the country benefits from development activities." The second pillar is said to protect cultural rights and reflect Bhutan's non-discriminatory nature.

== Human rights issues ==
=== Lhotshampa discrimination ===
The Lhotshampa are a heterogeneous Bhutanese people of Nepalese origin who have historically inhabited the southern regions of Bhutan. The Nepali who would become the Lhotshampa, or "southerners", began to emigrate from Nepal to Bhutan in the late 19th century. By the late 1980s, Bhutan's government recognised 28% of the population as Lhotshampa, though unofficial estimates go as high as 40% and also estimate that only 15% were legal residents. The extent of the Lhotshampa population became apparent in the 1988 census.

Subsequently, ethnic tensions strengthened in Bhutan, with many Lhotshampa branded as illegal immigrants, citizenship laws were enforced by new measures and an emphasis was placed on the "Tibetan-based Bhutanese culture, antagonising [the] minority Nepali community." To that end, conformity began to be demanded of the Lhotshampa in numerous ways. In 1989, the Nepali language was prohibited from being used in schools. That same year, a traditional Bhutanese dress code, the Driglam Namzha, was enforced among the general public, eschewing any traditional Nepali "costume" that might otherwise have been worn by Lhotshampas.

Violent unrest and anti-government protests occurred in 1990 within southern Bhutan in response to the "Bhutanization policies" that had been implemented. This "revolt" was met with a "crackdown" by the government that included the closure of 66 schools in southern Bhutan, as well as "harassment, arrests, and the burning of [Lhotshampa] homes." In late 1990 Lhotshampa refugees began entering Nepal, forced to leave Bhutan by the government after having been "arbitrarily stripped of their nationality." By 1995 86,000 Lhotshampa had taken up refugee status in Nepal, roughly one-sixth of Bhutan's then population of 509,000.

Unsuccessful talks between Nepal and Bhutan regarding the status of Bhutanese refugees, in particular regarding Nepal's desire for them to be repatriated, were held in 1993, 1996, and 2001. By 2009 some 111,000 Lhotshampa resided within refugee camps in Nepal when a "third country resettlement program" began which has seen 88,770 Bhutanese refugees resettled, including 75,000 in the United States. As of September 2015, 10,000 Lhotshampa remain in refugee camps in Nepal overseen by the Office of the UN High Commissioner for Refugees (UNHCR).

Bhutan's refugee situation has been categorised by Amnesty International as "one of the most protracted and neglected refugee crises in the world", with possible resolutions to the 'crisis' continuing to have been raised in the report of the working group for Bhutan's 2nd UPR cycle. There are ongoing delays by Bhutan's government to implement a process by which those Bhutanese refugees remaining in Nepal might be identified and repatriated. Of the Lhotshampa remaining in Bhutan many are not citizens or enjoy only limited citizenship rights, as there are categories of citizenship which affect their ability to receive a passport or vote.

Whether someone is a citizen may also affect which fundamental rights they are afforded under the Constitution. Bhutan's Constitution has also been criticised for not adequately defining or protecting the rights of "Nepali speakers" (the Lhotshampa).

The United States Department of State has noted in its 2015 report on Bhutan's human rights practices that there were unconfirmed reports of ongoing discrimination towards Lhotshampas preventing them from obtaining security clearances necessary to work in government jobs, from enrolling in higher education and obtaining licenses necessary to run private businesses. That report also noted that according to NGOs an unknown number of Lhotshampa in southern Bhutan were stateless persons who subsequently have trouble accessing public healthcare, employment, education, travel documents, and also owning businesses.

=== Religious freedom ===
Article 7.4 of the Constitution of Bhutan states that: "A Bhutanese citizen shall have the right to freedom of thought, conscience, and religion. No person shall be compelled to belong to another faith by means of coercion or inducement." Article 8.3 places the corresponding duty upon citizens to "foster tolerance, mutual respect and spirit of brotherhood amongst all the people of Bhutan transcending religious... diversities." Article 3 of the Constitution recognises Buddhism as "the spiritual heritage of Bhutan" while stipulating that the king is the "protector of all religions in Bhutan."

75% of Bhutan's approximate population of 733,000 practices Drukpa Kagyu or Nyingmapa Buddhism, which are forms of Mahayana Buddhism. Hindus make up 22% of Bhutan's population, Christians about 0.5%, or between 2,000–25,000 people, and Muslims only 0.2%. The Religious Organizations Act 2007 provides for the formation of religious groups, and all religious groups are required to be registered with the government. Registration is determined by the Commission for Religious Organisations, which is required to ensure religious institutions promote the country's spiritual heritage by "developing a society 'rooted in Buddhist ethos.'"

Only Buddhist groups and one Hindu "umbrella organisation" have been recognised, with other groups alleging their applications have been ignored. As a result, only Buddhist and Hindu groups are legally allowed to hold public religious gatherings, though members of other faiths were "sometimes" allowed to worship in private. The absence of Christian registration also prevents the presence of "Christian burial grounds,... church buildings and... book stores" in Bhutan.

The conditions placed upon religious worship in Bhutan have led some to claim that it is ambiguous whether practicing Christianity is legal there, noting this "ambiguity has resulted in harassment of the minority by officials." One anonymous Bhutanese pastor described treatment as "second-class" Christians. In March 2014 two Bhutanese pastors, Tandin Wangyal and M.B. Thapa, were detained for 49 days, released, and then fined and sentenced to prison in September of the same year. They were sentenced under laws relating to unlicensed assemblies and unapproved receipt of foreign funds; activists claim they were targeted for their evangelical activities and charged with raising unapproved money for civil society organisations, as well as with screening a Christian music video publicly, which they argue was done outside on private property. Tandin Wangyal was sentenced to four years imprisonment but was released on bail after paying a $744 (US) fine and appealed his case, while M.B. Thapa was sentenced to two and a half years imprisonment, which he was exempted from after paying a fine of $1630 (US).

There are reports of preferential treatment of Buddhists and Buddhism by the government, including extending financial support for construction of Buddhist temples and shrines and for monks and monasteries. There is also a strong societal pressure placed on individuals to retain Buddhist beliefs and traditions, as well as reported cases of non-Buddhist children being denied admission to schools and religious minorities being verbally harassed by Buddhists. Bhutan's restrictions upon freedom of religion, as well as the need for a Special Rapporteur on freedom of religion or belief to visit Bhutan, were raised as issues in Bhutan's 2nd cycle of the UPR.

In 2024, Freedom House rated Bhutan's religious freedom as 2 out of 4, noting that the constitution protects freedom of religion, but local authorities are known to harass non-Buddhists and people have experienced pressure to participate in Buddhist ceremonies and practices.

== See also ==
- Censorship in Bhutan
- LGBTQ rights in Bhutan
