= Royal Textile Academy of Bhutan =

School in Thimphu, Bhutan

Coordinates: 27.479228°N 89.635941°E

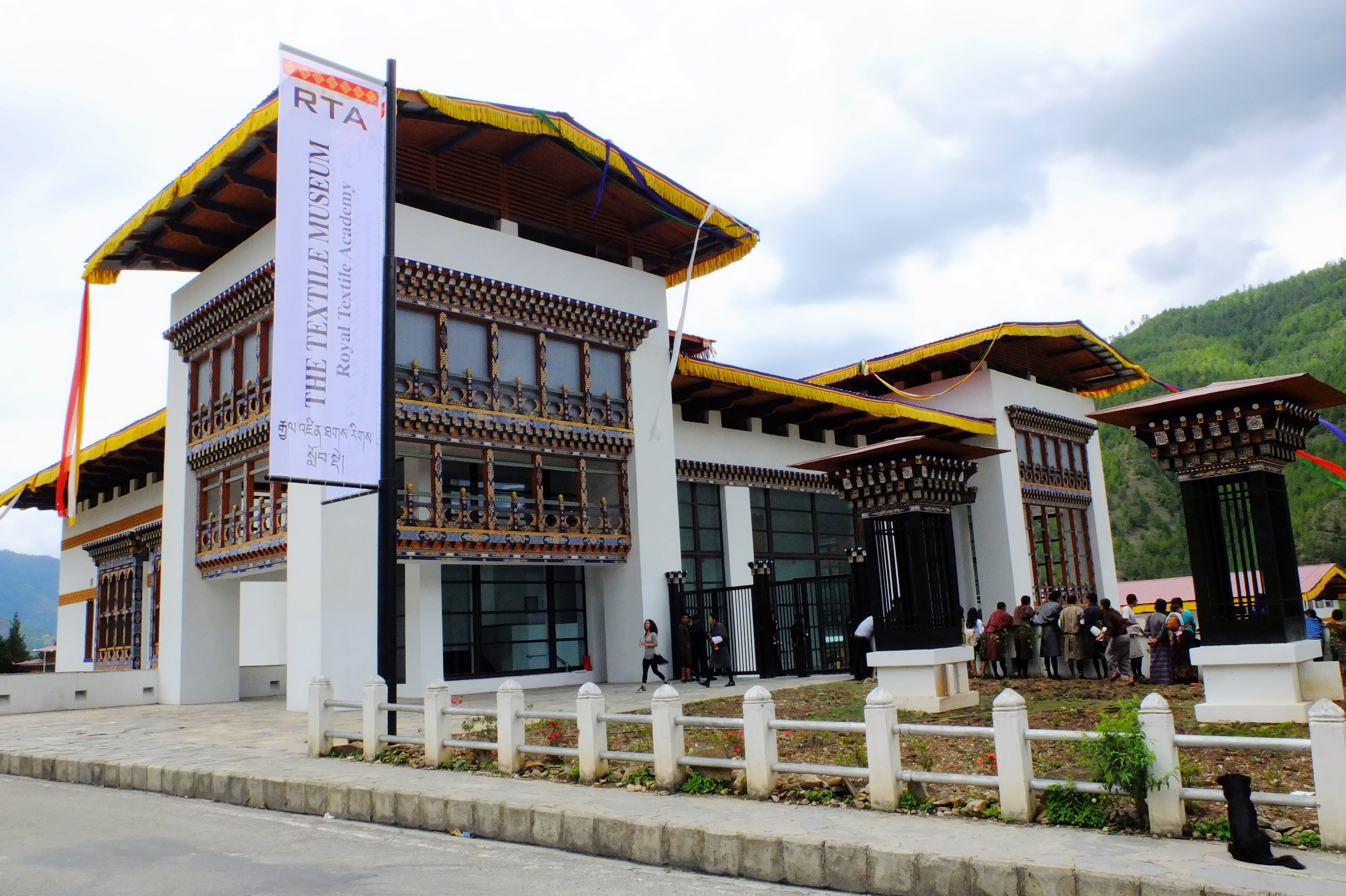
Royal Textile Academy of Bhutan

The Royal Textile Academy of Bhutan (རྒྱལ་འཛིན་ཐགས་རིགས་སློབ་སྡེ་) was founded to preserve and promote the living art of weaving which is an important part of the culture and tradition of Bhutan. Under the patronage of Her Majesty Ashi Sangay Choden Wangchuck, it is a non-government, non-profit organization established as an educational center for the training of individuals in traditional Bhutanese weaving.

It is a first institution in a country practicing and imparting global methods and techniques of conservation and preservation of the priceless textiles and other artifacts. The conservation centre has not only been responsible for the preservation and conservation of our artifacts but also provided our service to restore many pieces from several dzongs and monasteries in Bhutan.

== Honours ==
National honours

- Member of the National Order of Merit [in Gold] (17 December 2016).

== See also ==
- Textiles of Bhutan
- Bhutan Textile Museum
