= Damchae Dem =

Bhutanese entrepreneur

Damchae Dem is a businessperson and entrepreneur from Bhutan, who is CEO of Pelden Enterprise Limited, the first company to produce steel in Bhutan, and is president of the Bhutan Association of Women Entrepreneurs.

== Career ==
Born into poverty, her first business venture was cooking potato chips to sell locally. She attended High School at St. Helens Convent in Kurseong. She founded Pelden in the 1990s and in 2006 it became the first company in Bhutan to manufacture steel. The company exports ferrosilicon to Malaysia, Dubai, Singapore and Bangladesh. As of 2021 she was the CEO of Pelden Enterprise Limited.

In 2010 she founded the Bhutan Association of Women Entrepreneurs (BAOWE), and as of 2021 she was its president. In 2016 the organisation's work was formally recognised by the King of Bhutan with the award of the National Order of Merit. In addition to her work with BAOWE, she has also held a number of other important roles, including vice-presidencies of the SAARC Chamber of Women Entrepreneurs Council (SCWEC) and the South Asian Women Development Forum (SAWDF). In 2017 she led calls for the development of a Women's Chamber of Commerce for Bhutan.
