= Freedom of the press in Bhutan =

Freedom of the press in Bhutan is an ongoing social and political controversy in the country of Bhutan, particularly prior to the introduction of multiparty democracy in the country. Bhutanese journalists are reported to have limited access to the right to the freedom of the press, which may be in contravention of Bhutan's 2008 Constitution.

In 2016, journalist Namgay Zam was prosecuted for defamation after sharing a Facebook post regarding a woman's property dispute with a local businessman. She was eventually sentenced to three months in prison, and was required to pay a fine. This case was said to have exposed 'fault lines' in the protection of constitutional freedoms, regarding speech and the press.

Bhutanese government officials have enacted laws that restrict what can be shared on social media. While the constitution of Bhutan guarantees freedom of speech, civil servants such as journalists were historically denied this right due to a law that stated, "A civil servant shall not critique his agency and the Royal Government". However, this was contrary to Chapter Three of the Bhutan Information, Communications and Media Act of 2006 where journalists must be aware that any professional or government licensing of journalists is a violation of the Freedom of the Press, which has now been repealed. Bhutan is praised for its high level of "gross domestic happiness", but some citizens and people in the international community have come to question the legitimacy of this statement with regards to the prosecution of journalists and the subsequent breach of the Bhutanese Constitution. In 2023 the press freedom rating dropped from 33 to 90 after it improved in 2022.
