= Bhutan Textile Museum =

- Established: 2001
- Location: Thimphu, Bhutan
- Coordinates: 27.4666°N 89.6417°E
- Type: Textiles
- Director: National Commission for Cultural Affairs
- President: Royal Patron Queen Mother Ashi Sangay Choden Wangchuck

The Bhutan Textile Museum or the National Textile Museum is a national textiles museum in Thimphu, Bhutan, located near the National Library of Bhutan. It is operated by the National Commission for Cultural Affairs. Since its establishment in 2001, the museum has generated national and international attention and has garnered a substantial collection of antique textile artefacts, exclusive to Bhutan.

The objective of setting up the museum is to promote Bhutan's achievements in the field of textile arts and to sustain and promote interest of the weavers to continue the traditional textile patterns. The museum also envisions to become the centre for textile studies and research. The purpose is also to promote the history and culture of Bhutan.

== History ==
The significance of Bhutan's textiles is attributed to many factors such as: its intricate patterns in textile art (unique in the world), skills and methods adopted in their creation, noteworthy role in religious, official and social events represented by "glyphs and symbols of ancient knowledge" and their deep sacred connotation.

The Bhutan Textile Museum was first conceived by the Queen Mother Ashi Sangay Choden Wangchuck. It was established in 2001 and inaugurated by the Queen. The museum was constructed at a cost of around $165,000 with Danish assistance. Government of Bhutan and private donors also provided assistance to set up the museum. While the Peabody Essex Museum in the United States provided technical support to set up the museum. Wangchuck serves as the patron of the museum and has enhanced national and international interest in the Bhutanese textile industry.

== Displays ==
The museum is divided into six areas of special focus, including Achievements in textile arts, the role of textiles in religion, textiles from indigenous fibres, The Royal Collection, warp pattern weaves, and weft pattern weaves. The Royal Collection of the museum has an invaluable collection of Bhutanese antique textile artefacts of Bhutan, including crowns of Bhutan's kings, Namzas (dresses) and other accessories worn by the Royal Family, a pearl robe from Tsamdrak Goenpa and the bedding of Shabdrung Jigme Dorji.

Some of the unique collections donated by the Queen Mother, Ashi Sangay Choden Wangchuck, and some private individuals on display in the museum are: the first version of the Raven crown, brocade uzhams(crowns) worn by the first king, and the second king, and a princess crown worn by the sister of the first king, Ashi Wangmo.

The ground floor of the Textile Museum has displays demonstrating the skills of spinning, colouring fibres, preparing a loom, and manipulating two sets of yarns. Decorative fabrics and textile arts and crafts are categorically displayed in the galleries situated on the first floor of the Textile Museum. There are displays showing the traditional regional garments produced by women and men in Bhutan, and those garments used for special religious occasions.

== Exhibitions ==
The museum organises design competitions to display the best textiles. A novel method adopted for this competition is the selection process of public polling. In this procedure, the each textile proposed in the competition is tagged with a number. Visitors to the museum vote "for the best piece" of art based on the number of the art piece displayed. The name of the artist is not shown. Besides pesar, the traditional art form, innovative other textile designs in appliqué and embroidery have also been proposed for future competitions. The museum also has plans to host a textile festival which will be celebrated during the competition.

To sustain the interest of the weavers, sellers and artists, an auction process through bidding for the textiles "under consideration" has been introduced. In this process, the base price for the item on sale is fixed by the weaver and any bid amount received over and above the weaver's base price enriches the coffers of the museum. This procedure is adopted to ensure quality products of textiles to be woven by the weavers displaying intricate and appealing designs. The museum has also engaged two permanent weavers – one for pangtha (spinning) and another for thuetha (colouring) – to display the process of weaving. A small group of loom weavers at the museum produce work deriving from Lhuentse Dzongkhag, the ancestral home of the Bhutanese Royal Family in northeastern Bhutan.

== See also ==
- Textiles of Bhutan
