= Bhutan Centre for Media and Democracy =

Civil society organization in Bhutan

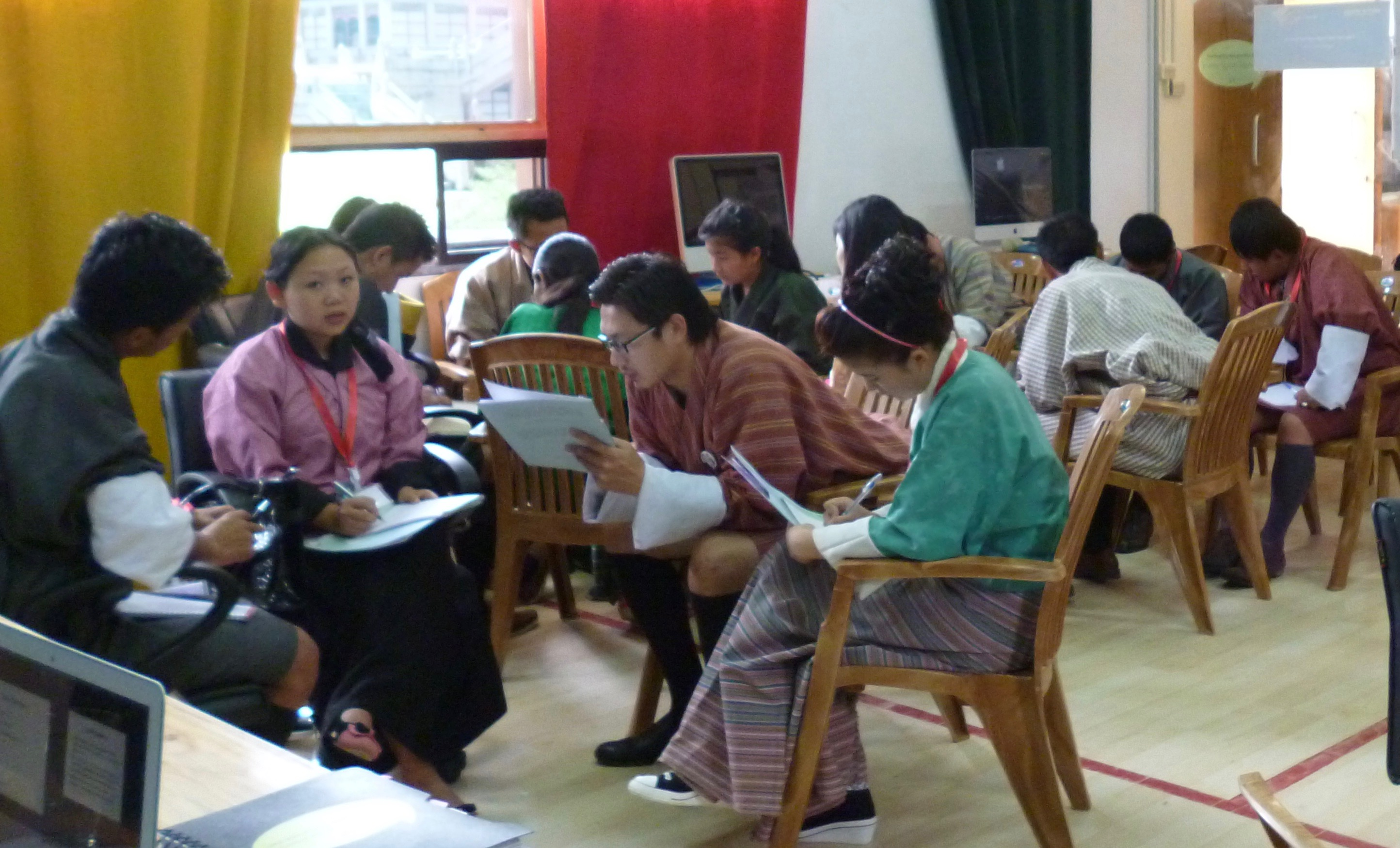
Bhutanese youths work in groups as part of a training day in democracy and action held by BCMD in Thimphu

The Bhutan Centre for Media and Democracy (BCMD) is the first Civil Society Organisation in Bhutan. It was launched in 2008 coinciding with the country's first government elections, which heralded a new era of self-governance following the abdication of the fourth king of Bhutan, Jigme Singye Wangchuck. At the same time, the media landscape saw the arrival of new private newspapers and radio stations, as well as social media via mobile telephones and the Internet. The stated mission of BCMD is to "nurture democracy in Bhutan through civic engagement, public discourse and media literate citizens".

In December, 2016 King Jigme Khesar Namgyel Wangchuck recognized the significant role being played by CSOs in the new democracy, awarding 22 National Orders of Merit (gold), to organisations that provided such non-government services as gender, governance, environment and media. BCMD, as the first CSO, has been described as a demonstration of the role this sector could play in the developing country, by "encouraging young people, teachers and local leaders to act as bridge to strengthen civic engagement".

== Operation and objectives ==
BCMD, like all Bhutanese CSOs, works according to the framework of Bhutan's philosophy of Gross National Happiness, which was proclaimed by the Fourth King of Bhutan to be a more important measure of a nation's wealth and progress than Gross National Product. The organisation states that:

BCMD believes in the power of ideas and openness to change the world. We believe that Bhutanese society is capable of making Gross National Happiness a reality through a vigorously contested and transparent set of elected institutions, a professional media and literate society, social justice and equity. Within the organization, we believe our team members are our assets, and we uphold innovativeness, integrity, accountability and teamwork.

The not-for-profit organisation runs an extensive range of programs at its media lab in the capital Thimphu, as well as in schools and rural areas, to help citizens understand their role in the new democracy, as well as to improve overall media literacy. It has a strong focus on teaching the youth to harness the power of media to help their communities. Programs include school media clubs, teacher training, photography workshops, video skills, community mapping of problems and resources, training rural groups in podcasting, holding forums for discussions on issues affecting Bhutanese society and facilitating dialogue at every level of society.

With its focus on media literacy and citizen engagement, BCMD publishes a bi-annual journal called Druk Journal; children's books in English and the national language Dzongkha; media guides for parents encouraging online safety; audio books; and guides to writing creative non-fiction (literary journalism).

The centre was launched by former broadcast journalist Siok Sian Pek-Dorji, who is the Executive Professional Director and is overseen by a board of directors that includes the former Executive Director Nancy Strickland, from the Bhutan Canada Foundation and Dr Dorji Thinley, President of Samtse College of Education. Advisors include former National Council Members Sangay Khandu and Dr Jagar Dorji, along with international specialists Howard Schneider of Stony Brook University, Mark Mancall, Professor Emeritus of Stanford University and Kavi Chongkittavorn, The Nation Multimedia Group, Thailand.

BCMD displays media produced by its members on a blog, Facebook and YouTube.
