= Bhutan Observer =

Bhutan's first private bilingual newspaper

- Type: Newspaper
- Publisher: Bhutan Observer Pvt. Ltd.
- Founded: June 2, 2006
- Language: English, Dzongkha
- Headquarters: Thimphu, Bhutan
- Circulation: All over Bhutan
- Price: Nu.10
- Website: bhutanobserver.com.bt

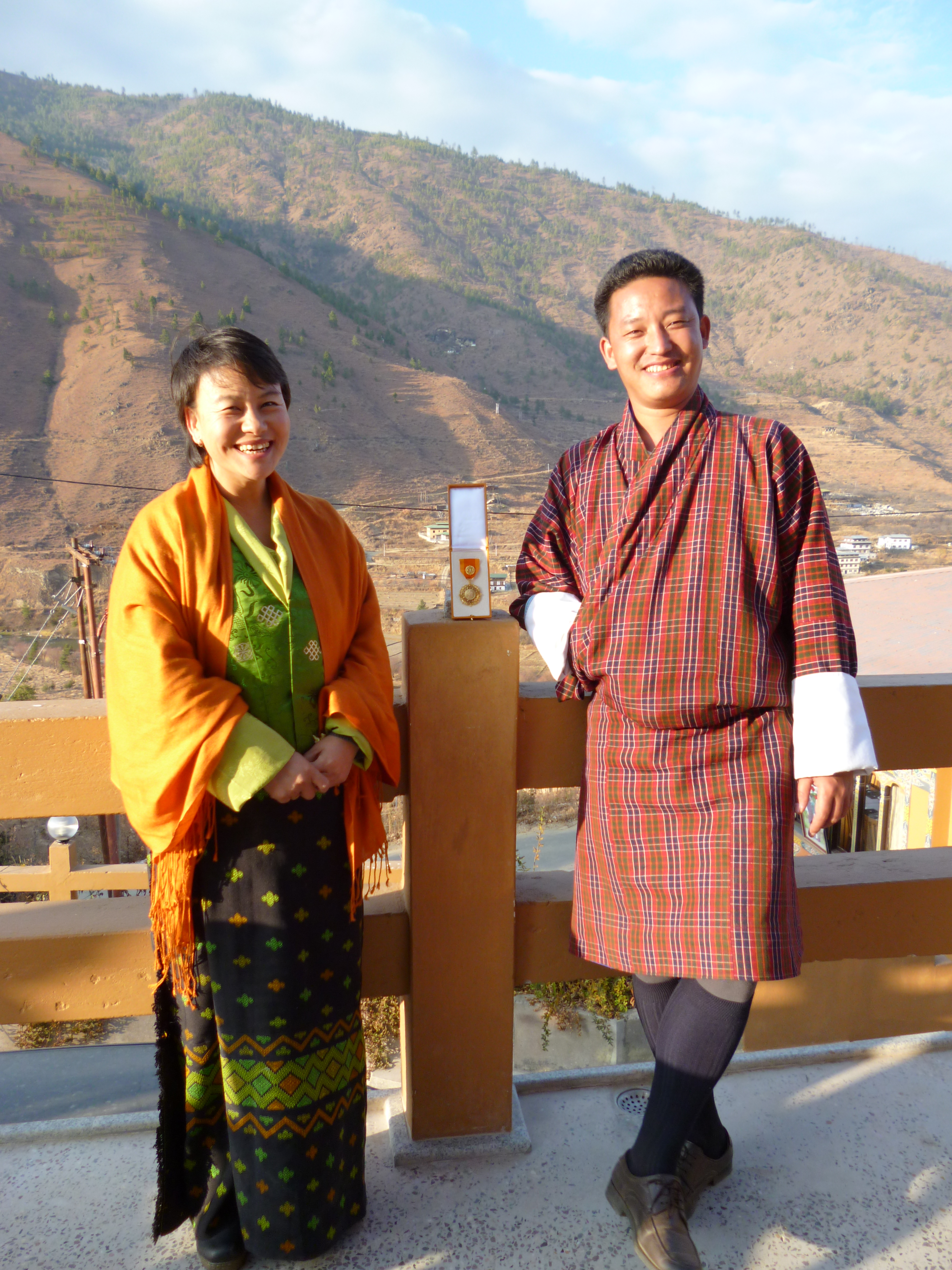
Phuntso Wangmo (left), CEO of Bhutan Observer, and Needrup Zangpo (right), Editor-in-Chief, with the National Order of Merit, awarded by His Majesty, King Jigme Khesar Namgyel Wangchuck, on December 17, 2011.

The Bhutan Observer was Bhutan's first private bilingual newspaper. It was launched as a private limited company by parent company Bhutan Media Services (BMS), and began publishing on June 2, 2006, in Thimphu. Its Dzongkha edition was called Druk Nelug, and the newspaper maintained an online service in English until 2013.

The newspaper employed about 60 people in editorial, commercial, administrative, and managerial departments. The editorial department won several national journalism awards for the best editorial, best Dzongkha issue, best editorial cartoon, and the most valuable story on Gross National Happiness. The former Executive Editor, Sonam Kinga, was one of several relatively young individuals to make an early entry into newly democratic Bhutanese politics in 2007, winning a seat and leadership position in the kingdom's first National Council elections.

As Bhutan began developing its private media sector, fledgling media outlets including the Bhutan Observer faced scrutiny by public figures over novice reporting, misquoted sources, and viewpoint biases with the effect of presenting overly sensational and negative coverage in articles. Language of publication has also become a significant issue, as government language requirements strain publishers' budgets.

== Druk Nelug ==
The Dzongkha edition, Druk Nelug, was published in compliance with government media language requirements. While Dzongkha is the national language, it is not spoken natively among the majority of Bhutanese. Among the general population, Dzongkha abilities have improved, but still need development according to a Bhutan Observer editor. Despite language reforms and improved public competency, many Bhutanese find English easier to read, speak, and write.

Amid concerns of the long term sustainability of the Bhutan Observer and other media's Dzongkha editions, the government in 2007 began to subsidize the translation of English language advertisements into Dzongkha, and granted exemptions from sales tax and import duties. The tax breaks were set to expire after a period of five years, but may be renewed. Both the Dzongkha Druk Nelug and English language Bhutan Observer were heavily subsidized by government advertisements within a marketing industry subject to significant government control on a policy basis. In 2011, nearing the five year mark and having neither approached sustainability nor obtained tangible government support, the Observer requested that the Bhutan InfoComm and Media Authority (BICMA) allow it to discontinue publication of Druk Nelug; that request was denied. The newspaper said it would abide by the government's decision, but that the Druk Nelug might be reduced to a symbolic publication due to its commercial infeasibility.

== End of Print Publication ==
On August 1, 2013, the Bhutan Observer announced the end of its printed edition. It continued as an online publication which also ended in 2016.

== Honours ==
- Bhutan :
  - Member of the National Order of Merit [in Gold] (17 December 2011).

== See also ==
- Bhutan Broadcasting Service
- Bhutan Times
- Kuensel
- Media of Bhutan
