= BBS 2 =

- Type: Television channel
- Country: Bhutan
- Broadcast area: Worldwide
- Network: Bhutan Broadcasting Service
- Headquarters: Thimphu, Bhutan

Programming
- Language(s): Dzongkha; English
- Picture format: 1080p HDTV (downscaled to letterboxed 576i for the SDTV feed)

Ownership
- Owner: Government of Bhutan
- Parent: Bhutan Broadcasting Service
- Sister channels: BBS 1 BBS 3

History
- Launched: 21 January 2012; 13 years ago

Links
- Website: BBS

BBS 2 is the second television channel of the Bhutan Broadcasting Service, carrying an entertainment and variety schedule. It has been carried over-the-air since its beginning.

== History ==
The corporation was planning the creation of a second channel since mid-2011, at a time when regulator BICMA was also analyzing six bids for private television stations. BBS 2 started its experimental broadcasts on 8 January 2012, after a week of test transmissions on the terrestrial network. That same day, it started satellite broadcasting. From the following day, the channel started carrying live proceedings of the National Assembly and the National Council. After the parliament sessions, BBS 2 would broadcast entertainment, documentary and children's programs. Tashi Dorji was the channel's manager from the start. Official broadcasts started on 21 January. In its first weeks on air, the channel replaced BBS 1 which was temporarily available only on cable and satellite. At an unknown date, when BBS 1 was restored to its previous frequencies, BBS 2 moved to VHF channel 9 or 11, depending on the location.

Among its first programs was My World, the first locally made weekly kids show on national television, with training from German professionals (from Deutsche Welle).

For the first anniversary of Gyalsey on 5 February 2017, BBS 2 premiered the first Dzongkha dub of an animated series, the Thai series Shelldon. The series was offered from free due to connections with a friend of the Bhutanese Prime Minister, who owns the producer of the series (Shellhut Entertainment) and its IP.

On 25 March 2020, BBS 1 and BBS 2 started airing classes on television during the lockdown, which led to the proposal for the creation of a third channel.

BBS 2 also airs programs from embassies. Between 10 and 14 October 2021, during the Online Japan Week, the channel carried Explore Japan, a co-production between the Japanese embassy in New Delhi and NHK, at 9pm.
