= BBS 1 =

Main television channel of Bhutan Broadcasting Service

- Type: Television channel
- Country: Bhutan
- Broadcast area: Worldwide
- Network: Bhutan Broadcasting Service
- Headquarters: Thimphu, Bhutan

Programming
- Languages: Dzongkha; English
- Picture format: 1080p HDTV (downscaled to letterboxed 576i for the SDTV feed)

Ownership
- Owner: Government of Bhutan
- Parent: Bhutan Broadcasting Service
- Sister channels: BBS 2 BBS 3

History
- Launched: 2 June 1999; 26 years ago
- Former names: BBS Television (1999-2011)

Links
- Website: BBS

BBS 1 is the main television channel of the Bhutan Broadcasting Service. It started broadcasting on 2 June 1999 and was the first local television station in Bhutan. The channel broadcasts programmes for five hours a day from 6pm to 11pm, mostly news and cultural programming, in both English and Dzongkha languages, and are repeated the following morning.

== History ==
=== Background and early usage of television in Bhutan ===
In 1999, Bhutan became one of the last countries to adopt television, as previously, Bhutan prohibited television to protect its culture from modern, global, and western influence.

In the 1980s, Bhutanese residents who had a television set were able to pick up signals from Doordarshan and Bangladesh Television via spillover, with the signal being blocked by the mountains in the southern lowlands. The emergence of satellite television also led to the installation of some dishes, but these were outlawed in 1989, alongside television sets, per a ruling that it undermined Bhutan's "rich cultural heritage", until BBS would start a service of its own. Despite the ban, a few television sets (mostly black and white) were still in use in Bhutan, receiving overspill signals of both DD National and DD Metro. Viewers with television were enticed by the feature films and cartoons broadcast on the two channels; when DD premiered Shaktimaan in 1997, the series gained a small footing in Bhutan.

=== Road to launch ===
After a successful pilot project for the airing of the 1998 FIFA World Cup final in Thimphu by some sports associations, partly derived from the fact that some viewers were unable to watch the match, the Bhutanese king Jigme Singye Wangchuk lifted its television ban as part of a modernization plan and announced that BBS would start its television service from 2 June, coinciding with the twenty-fifth anniversary of his coronation. Initially, its signal was limited to Thimphu and its programming would prioritize cultural programming. The announcement of its introduction saw living rooms being rearranged in order to accommodate television sets. Technical training for BBS TV was possible due to the efforts of former SBC reporter Siok Sian Pek-Dorji, who, while in Bhutan at the time, became a program consultant; she had been appointed in March 1999 before the king's announcement was made public. Programming in Nepali, a language which gained a sizeable speaker base due to immigration from Nepal in the 20th century, was out of question.

=== Early years ===
Opening night on 2 June 1999 was turned on by a Hong Kong consultant, which started twenty minutes later than planned due to technical issues. The service was opened by one of the king's four wives, Queen Ashi Tshering Pem Wangchuck. The start time of BBS TV varied depending on the day and had no fixed time, being dependent on the activities of the government officials, who would turn it on as late as 9pm. Broadcasts ended with a Buddhist prayer before fading to black. Electronics stores in Thimphu sold at least one hundred television sets in the early days of the service. BBS had already hired Ugyen Dorji to produce local programs, Dorji was already a Westernized Bhutanese who, after selling his cassette store in the early 90s, set up a recording studio in 1995. The corporation was keen on setting up a television series featuring a detective in Thimphu. The limited schedule was due to the fact that BBS did not have enough technical experience (its staff came from radio) to justify a longer service, as well as lack of manpower. To solve some of these issues, BBS had planned the creation of a dedicated BBS TV Center with assistance from the Indian government.

In its early years, BBS faced competition from cable television, which had a wider reach. By 2002, BBS was broadcasting its programming for two hours a day, from 7pm to 9pm, with the bulk of its programming being in English. The negative impact of foreign satellite-fed television channels, mostly from India, BBS was seen as a counterweight to cable television, but the enticement locals had of foreign TV led to BBS having a bad image, due to the lack of quality of its programs and constant technical glitches, a sharp contrast compared to the available international channels. A 2002 estimate by Rinzy Dorji, owner of Sigma Cable, put BBS in fifth place behind movie and sports channels, believed to be the most watched at the time. Still, BBS produced little local output due to its limited budget.

Before the introduction of satellite uplink, BBS's lone transmitter was a 1KW Thomcast transmitter in Thimphu, broadcasting a signal on VHF channel 5. BBS delivered tapes of its programs to air locally in Trashigang, which arrived by bus and mule; the aim was to improve its public image. The TV programs were simulcast on BBS's radio station during its hours of operation, reaching an audience outside of Thimphu unable to receive its signals. On 16 December 2004, coinciding with Bhutan's 97th National Day, BBS TV added an extra hour of programming (now running from 6pm to 10pm) increasing again in 2005 to the current five hours a day with a repeat in the following morning, in line with a similar decision for BBS Radio. It had outlined a longer, six-hour plan for 2005, to counteract the influence of Indian channels on cable. Then on 20 February 2006, BBS started satellite broadcasts in order to cover all of Bhutan, using the INSAT-4A satellite; it had originally attempted to start satellite broadcasts by the end of 2004. This coincided with the first television audience survey. In September, the television and radio units finally became separate. The implementation of its satellite signal saw BBS gaining a national transmitter network, having 29 transmitters by 2015, carrying both television channels.

=== Later developments ===
By 2007, BBS was countering the mass influx of foreign (especially Indian) programs with homegrown programs. Its production of children's programs was limited, due to lack of manpower across all units. On 17 August 2009, BBS received a grant from the Japanese government worth US$6 million, in order to increase the capacity of its news production.

In June 2010, Communications Minister Lyonpo Nandalal Rai suggested that BBS TV should broadcast a 24-hour schedule, like what its radio station was doing, however, BBS officials said that such a conversion was not possible until at least 2012, partly due to concerns that Indian satellite television providers would misuse its downtime. BBS was studying the possibility of uplinking its service to Bharti Airtel. In the early weeks of 2012, the newly-launched BBS 2 temporarily used BBS 1's frequencies.

On 25 March 2020, BBS 1 and BBS 2 started airing classes on television during the lockdown.

On 26 July 2023, BBS 1 started high-definition broadcasts after the corporation received a Nu 250 million grant obtained from the Government of India.
