= BBS 3 =

- Type: Television channel
- Country: Bhutan
- Broadcast area: Worldwide
- Network: Bhutan Broadcasting Service
- Headquarters: Thimphu, Bhutan

Programming
- Languages: Dzongkha; English
- Picture format: 1080p HDTV

Ownership
- Owner: Government of Bhutan
- Parent: Bhutan Broadcasting Service
- Sister channels: BBS 1 BBS 2

History
- Launched: 13 October 2021; 4 years ago

Links
- Website: BBS

BBS 3 is an educational television channel owned by, but technically autonomous from, the Bhutan Broadcasting Service. The channel was created by initiative of the Ministry of Education and Skills Development.

== History ==
Beginning 25 March 2020, following the effects of the lockdown on education, the two BBS channels started airing classes during daytime. More than one week later, the Ministry of Education and Skills Development started entering consultancies with like-minded agencies, Royal Education Council (REC), Bhutan Council for School Examinations and Assessment (BCSEA) and Royal University of Bhutan (RUB). The ministry had formed a team to draft programs to air on the new BBS channel, which would continue past the pandemic. The channel was scheduled to launch in May.

It was later announced that BBS 3 would start on 13 October 2021. It was automatically added to the list of approved television channels.

As of October 2024, BBS 3 employs a staff of 14, which is also in charge of producing local programs. Tsedon Dorji is the channel's managing director.
