= The Journalist (Bhutan) =

- Type: Weekly newspaper
- Owner(s): Sonam Gyeltshen
- Editor: Sonam Tashi
- Founded: December 2009
- Political alignment: Apolitical
- Language: English
- Headquarters: Thimphu, Bhutan
- Website: bhutanjournalist.com

The Journalist, published in Thimphu, is an English language weekly newspaper published in Bhutan. It was launched in December 2009. The Journalist is Bhutan's fifth private newspaper.
