= Bhutan Today =

Newspaper in Bhutan

- Owner(s): Ngawang Dorji & Tenzin Dorji
- Founded: 31 Oct 2008
- Language: English
- Headquarters: Thimphu, Bhutan
- Sister newspapers: Druk Yoedzer
- Website: bhutantoday.bt

Bhutan Today, published in Thimphu, is the fourth English language newspaper published in Bhutan. It was launched in October 2008.
