= Druk Yoedzer =

Private newspaper in Bhutan

- Type: Weekly (Saturday)
- Format: Normal
- Owner(s): Sonam Rinchen
- Founder(s): Sonam Rinchen
- Publisher: Druk Yoedzer
- Editor-in-chief: Dorji Wangdi
- Editor: Dorji Wangdi
- Staff writers: 20+
- Founded: 19 February 2011
- Political alignment: Karma
- Language: Dzongkha
- Headquarters: Thimphu
- Circulation: 2000

Druk Yoedzer (DY) is a private newspaper in Bhutan. It is a Dzongkha-English weekly newspaper (Saturday). It was founded by Sonam Rinchen. As Bhutan has begun developing its private media sector, Druk Yoedzer is also one that has been recently opened.

The weekly Druk Yoedzer was launched on 19 February 2011, the eighth newspaper in the country. The paper covers national and local news, entertainment, custom and religion, sports, and Dzongkha news. Druk Yoedzer has six reporters, all were trained by Bhutan Media Foundation (BMF). It has sixteen pages and is available every Saturday for ngultrum 10. The main objectives of Druk Yoedzer are to focus more on developing Dzongkha journalism and to promote and preserve the national language Dzongkha.

== Circulation ==
Druk Yoedzer circulates 2000 papers in total and only 545 papers are circulated in Thimphu.

== Personnel ==
Druk Yoedzer has six journalists trained by the experienced journalists of the country. They were also given a short duration of training by Bhutan Media Institute under the funding of the Royal Government of Bhutan.
