= Bhutan Broadcasting Service =

State-funded radio and television service in Bhutan

Bhutan Broadcasting Service (BBS)
- Type: Public corporation (since 1992) government-owned broadcaster
- Industry: Broadcasting
- Founded: 1973; 53 years ago (as Radio NYAB); 1986; 40 years ago (radio, as BBS); 1999; 27 years ago (television)
- Headquarters: Thimphu, Bhutan
- Key people: Dorji Tashi, CEO
- Products: TV, radio, online services
- Number of employees: 335
- Website: www.bbs.bt

The Bhutan Broadcasting Service (BBS, Dzongkha: འབྲུག་རྒྱང་བསྒྲགས་ལས་འཛིན, romanized: 'brug rgyang bsgrags las 'dzin) is a state-funded radio and television service in Bhutan. It is a public service corporation, the only service to offer both radio and television in the kingdom, and the only television broadcaster based in Bhutan. The use of telecommunications is currently governed through the Information, Communications and Media Act of 2006.

== History ==
For many years, Bhutan did not have modern telecommunications. The first radio broadcasts commenced in November 1973, when the National Youth Association of Bhutan (NYAB) began radio transmissions of news and music for a half-hour each Sunday, under the name "Radio NYAB." The transmitter was first rented from a local telegraph office in Thimphu. The government took over Radio NYAB in 1979, and renamed it the Bhutan Broadcasting Service in 1986, with expansions in radio scheduling as well as construction of a modern broadcast facility occurring in 1991.

For a long time, Bhutan was the only nation in the world to ban television. BBS announced plans to start the service in April 1999, with the channel complementing other media outlets as a "catalyst in nation-building". The first night of television broadcasts finally occurred on June 2, 1999, on the night of the Jigme Singye Wangchuck's silver jubilee.

=== Radio in Bhutan ===
Shortwave radio reached all of Bhutan in 1991. In June 2000, FM stations opened in the south and west of the country, expanding to central Bhutan in January 2001. By the end of 2005, FM radio service reached the entire country. Since November 2009, radio airs for 24 hours a day (23 hours and 21 minutes taking into account pauses and connection breaks), with the low listening times of 2 a.m. to 6 a.m. featuring repeats of the previous day's schedule. 14 hours and 45 minutes of each broadcast day is broadcast in Dzongkha, with 3 hours and 45 minutes broadcast in English, 2 hours and 53 minutes in Sharchop and an hour and 58 minutes in Nepali.

A second station entirely in Dzongkha started in 2012.

=== Television in Bhutan ===
BBS is the first television station in Bhutan. News, documentaries, and entertainment programs were originally broadcast for one hour in the evening (7 p.m. to 8 p.m.), seven days a week, but expanded to four hours (6 p.m. to 10 p.m.) in December 2004. Once limited to the capital city, television service spread to the entire Kingdom via satellite in February 2006. It operates 31 TV stations across the country.

In 2008, BBS expanded their television schedule to air from 6 p.m. to 11 p.m. Most of the programming is aired in Dzongkha, but two current events and news programs each night are aired in English.

The programming from the previous night is repeated from 6 a.m. to 11 a.m. the next morning. Special entertainment and music request programs are also aired between 3 p.m. and 6 p.m. on weekends.

BBS announced in 2022 that it would upgrade its equipment to high definition, having received Nu 40 million in equipment from South Korea. On July 26, 2023, HD broadcasts of the two main channels began.

==== Channels ====
- BBS TV (BBS 1): BBS' flagship channel, it broadcasts news and current affairs, education, sports, and culture. It launched on June 2, 1999 as the first television channel of Bhutan. The high-definition feed started broadcasting on July 26, 2023.
- BBS 2: BBS' general entertainment channel, it was launched in 2012. The high-definition feed started broadcasting on July 26, 2023.
- BBS 3: BBS' educational channel, it was launched in May 2020. The high-definition feed started broadcasting on July 26, 2023.

== Controversy ==
Although BBS is extremely popular among the Bhutanese people, mismanagement has plagued its growth. The government's attempts to keep its actions and content under its control include deputing senior civil servants as CEOs and toying with the annual budget string. Anchors suddenly disappear from the screen. One of the producers has sued the BBS in court. BBS is also known for its quality programs. In the early years of television, it lacked trained manpower.

On December 6, 2012, the Indian Intelligence Bureau red flagged the Bhutan Broadcasting Service as a "hate channel" among 24 others for beaming what it deemed "anti-India content". A proposal for action was sent to the Indian Ministry of Home Affairs.

On December 23, 2023, the Office of the Media Arbitrator cautioned BBS over an article published on its website on December 20, saying that its election coverage was not balanced.

== See also ==
- Mass media in Bhutan
- Telecommunications in Bhutan
