= Kuensel =

National newspaper of Bhutan

Kuensel ཀུན་གསལ།
- Type: National newspaper
- Owner: Kuensel Corporation
- Publisher: Kuensel Corporation
- Editor: Tshering Palden
- Founded: 1967; 59 years ago
- Language: Dzongkha and English
- Headquarters: Thimphu
- Country: Bhutan
- Price: Nu Nu 20
- ISSN: 0259-1499
- Website: www.dzkuensel.bt www.kuenselonline.com

Kuensel (Dzongkha: ཀུན་གསལ།, romanized: kun gsal; lit. 'Clarity') is the national newspaper of the Kingdom of Bhutan. It was the only local newspaper available in Bhutan until 2006 when two more newspapers were launched. The government of Bhutan owns 51% of Kuensel while 49% is held by the public.

Kuensel is published in two language editions: Dzongkha (the national language) and English, everyday except Sunday with a total weekly circulation of more than 15,000 copies and an average weekly readership of 130,000.

The paper is distributed throughout the country by a string of sales agents appointed in all the dzongkhags, dungkhags and towns, while subscribers overseas are fed through mail service/e-mail. Subscribers also get a PDF version of the paper.

== History ==
Kuensel was founded in 1965 and it used to be published by Mani printing press in Kalimpong as an internal government bulletin.

Kinley Dorji, who graduated from Columbia University, New York with a master's degree in journalism, served as editor of Kuensel, and later as both editor-in-chief and managing director, between 1986 and 2009.

Kuensel had a total circulation in 1988 of 12,500 and was published in Dzongkha, Nepali, and English.

In 1992, a royal edict de-linked Kuensel from the government and made it an autonomous corporation to allow for the professional growth of the media. It stopped receiving government subsidy in 1998. Today, the newspaper is subsidized by commercial printing and advertisements.

In 1996 the size of the paper was expanded from 12 to 16 pages in Dzongkha and English and to 20 pages in 1999. In February 2005 Kuensel began publishing a 12-page edition twice a week, on Wednesdays and Saturdays. In 2006 the Wednesday edition was increased to 14 pages and the Saturday edition to 18 pages with a colour pull-out lifestyle section called CityBytes.

Kuensel Corporation Limited., started an online version of the paper in 1999 (kuenselonline.com) the year internet first came to Bhutan. It has grown to become the most popular site on Bhutan with daily news updates on the happenings in the kingdom and an equally active discussion forum. In 2006, kuenselonline.com had an average of 3,000 visitors a day with more than 15,000 registered members.

Kuensel is published from the capital, Thimphu, and Kanglung, Trashigang, in eastern Bhutan where a press was set up in 2005. This has ensured that the paper is available in all districts on the day of publication.

Kuensel was the sole newspaper in Bhutan up until April 2006 when it was joined by the Bhutan Times (and by the Bhutan Observer in June 2006).

The setting up of a press in Kanglung in December 2005 has ensured that the paper is available in all the dzongkhags on the day of publication.

== Ownership ==
In 2006 Kuensel Corporation ltd., divested 245,000 shares of a face value of Nu. 100 a share, constituting 49 percent of the paid up capital, to the public. 51 percent of the corporation is held by the government. In May 2007, Kuensel Corporation Limited., held its first annual general meeting with its shareholders. Two members from the public shareholders were elected to the five-member board of directors. The other three members are government appointees.

== Personnel ==
The corporation has an editorial team headed by a chief editor, a dzongkha language editor, a news editor, a managing editor, a chief reporter and bureau correspondents in Trashigang, Phuentsholing, Zhemgang and Bumthang and reporters in Thimphu.

Most of the reporters have basic training with The Straits Times of Singapore and the Asian College of Journalism in Chennai, India. Some reporters have done internships with papers in the Philippines and with the mainstream newspapers in India. Two of the present staff have received international postgraduate degrees in journalism.

While radio has the widest reach in Bhutan and international cable television has become a staple in many Bhutanese homes, Kuensel is read by the literate population and decision-makers. It has continued to see a gradual increase in circulation over the years.

== Online media ==
Kuensel Online became the first Online newspaper in Bhutan on April 18, 2001. The website and publishing system was initially developed by Neil Herdegen, who was employed as the Webmaster of The Nation (Thailand). Neil Herdegen visited Bhutan in 2001 and worked with the new Kuensel webmaster, Chencho Tshering, to develop and integrate a Content management system that allowed reporters to edit and publish stories online, enabling them to post stories from any remote location in the country. Kuensel Online also published an Internet forum which has attracted more than 100,000 members and has given Bhutanese people the opportunity to discuss important topics that have shaped Bhutanese society. The site is hosted and maintained by Neil Herdegen and Webexa. The site is the most visited site in the country of Bhutan, currently responsible for most of the internet traffic in Bhutan and uses a dedicated server located in a secure U.S. Data center.
