= Business Bhutan =

- Type: Weekly newspaper
- Format: Tabloid
- Owner(s): Chhimi Norbhu, Chimi Yangden
- Founded: December 2009
- Language: English and Dzongkha
- Headquarters: Thimphu, Bhutan
- Price: BTN 20
- Website: businessbhutan.bt

Business Bhutan is Bhutan's only financial newspaper. It is a weekly paper, written mainly in English with a Dzongkha language section, focuses on business, finance, and politics in Bhutan.

== Sources ==
- Business Bhutan is Launched
- Journalists Association of Bhutan
