= Bhutan Times =

Privately owned newspaper in Bhutan

- Owner: Bhutan Media Services
- Founded: 2006
- Language: English
- Headquarters: Thimphu, Bhutan
- Website: bhutantimes.bt

The Bhutan Times is Bhutan's first privately owned newspaper, and only the second in the country after the government owned and autonomous Kuensel. Its first edition, with 32 pages, hit newsstands on April 30, 2006, with a high-profile interview of Jigme Khesar Namgyal Wangchuck, the young crown prince of Bhutan, who had recently been designated to succeed his father as king in 2008.

The creation of a free press within Bhutan is recognized as an important step in the ongoing transformation of Bhutan into a democratic society. The weekly paper came out on Sundays until December 2007 when the management decided to become a bi-weekly paper. Bhutan Times came out on Wednesdays and Sundays for a period before reverting to only being published on Sundays.

The private newspaper is run by a group of young reporters and editors. At its peak, the paper employed 98 people, but as of 2019, that had decreased to 10.

Another private newspaper called the Bhutan Observer was launched later in 2006.

In 2009, its editorial staff resigned en masse due to disagreements with the paper's leadership, prompting concern from the International Federation of Journalists.
