= Wangchuk =

Wangchuk or Wangchuck is a given name and surname. Notable people with the name include:

- Daja Wangchuk Meston (born 1970), author and Tibet activist
- Dorji Wangmo Wangchuck (born 1955), one of the four wives and queens of Bhutanese king Jigme Singye Wangchuck
- House of Wangchuck, rulers of Bhutan since it was reunified in 1907
- Jigme Dorji Wangchuck (1928–1972), the third king of Bhutan from 1952 to 1972
- Jigme Khesar Namgyel Wangchuck (born 1980), the fifth king of Bhutan, current Druk Gyalpo
- Jigme Singye Wangchuck (born 1955), the fourth king of Bhutan, current king father
- Jigme Wangchuck (1905–1952), the second king of Bhutan from 1926 to 1952
- Jigyel Ugyen Wangchuck (born 1984), prince of Bhutan
- Ugyen Jigme Wangchuck (born 1994), prince of Bhutan
- Jigme Dorji Wangchuck (born 1986), prince and regent of Bhutan
- Euphelma Choden Wangchuck (born 1993), princess of Bhutan
- Jetsun Pema Wangchuck (born 1990), only wife and queen of Bhutanese king Jigme Khesar Namgyel Wangchuck
- Jigme Namgyel Wangchuck (born 2016), current crown prince of Bhutan
- Jigme Ugyen Wangchuck (born 2020), prince of Bhutan
- Sonam Yangden Wangchuck (born 2023), princess of Bhutan
- Chimi Yangzom Wangchuck (born 1980), princess of Bhutan
- Phuntsho Choden Wangchuck (1911–2003), former queen grandmother of Bhutan, first wife of king Jigme Wangchuck
- Pema Dechen Wangchuck (1918–1991), former queen grandmother of Bhutan, second wife of king Jigme Wangchuck
- Kesang Choden Wangchuck (born 1930), queen grandmother of Bhutan, only wife of king Jigme Dorji Wangchuck
- Kesang Choden Wangchuck (born 1982), princess of Bhutan
- Khamsum Singye Wangchuck (born 1985), prince of Bhutan
- Khandu Wangchuk (born 1950), political figure in Bhutan
- Sangay Choden Wangchuck (born 1963), one of the four wives and queens of Bhutanese king Jigme Singye Wangchuck
- Sonam Wangchuk (1964-2026), Indian Army officer
- Sonam Wangchuk (born 1966), engineer, innovator and education reformist
- Sonam Dechen Wangchuck (born 1981), princess of Bhutan
- Dechen Yangzom Wangchuck (born 1981), princess of Bhutan
- Tenpai Wangchuk (1855–1882), the 8th Panchen Lama of Tibet
- Tshering Pem Wangchuck, one of the four wives and queens of Bhutanese king Jigme Singye Wangchuck
- Tshering Yangdon Wangchuck, one of the four wives and queens of Bhutanese king Jigme Singye Wangchuck (mother of current king)
- Ugyen Wangchuck (1861–1926), the first king of Bhutan from 1907 to 1926
- Wangchuk Dorje (1556–1603), the ninth Gyalwa Karmapa, head of the Kagyu School of Tibetan Buddhism
- Wangchuk Namgyal (born 1953), the second son of Palden Thondup Namgyal, the last sovereign king of Sikkim
- Wangchuk Namgyel (born 1964), educationist and politician figure in Bhutan
- Sangay Wangchuk (born 1981), long-distance runner
