= Choden =

Choden is a Tibetan and Bhutanese name that may refer to

- Phuntsho Choden (1911–2003), late Queen Grandmother of Bhutan
- Kesang Choden (born 1930), Queen Grandmother of Bhutan
- Sangay Choden (born 1963), Queen Mother of Bhutan
- Kesang Choden (born 1982), Princess of Bhutan
- Euphelma Choden (born 1993), Princess of Bhutan
- Dorji Choden (born 1960), Bhutanese politician
- Khendum Choden, Bhutanese poet and author
- Kunzang Choden (born 1952), Bhutanese writer
- Kunzang Choden (born 1984), Bhutanese sports shooter
- Kyabje Choden Rinpoche (1931–2015), Tibetan Buddhist Meditation Master and Scholar
- Tshering Choden (born 1979), Bhutanese archer
- Tashi Choden (born 1998), Bhutanese-Tibetan pageant titleholder

== See also ==
- Choden F.C., a football club in Bhutan

Thinley Norbu (Tibetan: ཕྲིན་ལས་ནོར་བུ། English: Jewel of Activity) was the oldest son.
