= Yangchenphug Higher Secondary School =

Location
- Yangchenphug; Thimphu; Bhutan; 28.49187°N 91.60792°E

Information
- Type: Government School
- Motto: Hardwork/Tsoenshu
- Religious affiliation: Buddhist
- Established: 14 April 1965; 61 years ago
- Staff: 68 (approx.)
- Gender: Co-educational
- Enrollment: 1465
- Houses: 8
- Publication: Yangchen Juedmang; Annual School Magazine
- Website: http://www.yhs.edu.bt/

Yangchenphug Higher Secondary School ( Dzongkha : དབྱངས་ཅན་ཕུག་འབྲིང་རིམ་སློབ་གྲྭ་གོང་མ ) is a co-ed public high school in Thimphu, Bhutan. It was founded in 1965 by the third King, His Majesty Jigme Dorji Wangchuck.

== Etymology ==
The term "Yangchenphug" is derived from Tibetan Buddhist terminology and local geography. "Yangchen" is a reference to "Lhamo Yangchenma," a figure in Tibetan Buddhism regarded as the goddess of wisdom and music. In this context, the suffix "phug" corresponds to "hill". The school's annual magazine is named "Yangchen Juedmang," which symbolizes the lute, a musical instrument traditionally associated with the goddess Yangchenma. The term "Yangchenphug" combines cultural and geographical elements to reflect its unique identity within the context of Tibetan Buddhist traditions and local landscape.

== History of School ==
Yangchenphug Higher Secondary School has historically been a premier high school in the country, with many notable alumni, including the fifth king, Jigme Khesar Namgyel Wangchuck. The school was started in 1965 by His Majesty Jigme Dorji Wangchuck. Initially the school started as a co-ed, residential school named Thimphu Public School, run on the pattern of Public schools in India. The school had classes from Kindergarten to four. The first faculty included 6 teachers. In 1976, Thimphu Public School was renamed to Yangchenphug Central School; a decade later it became Yangchepnhug High School. In 2001, the institution was given the name it now holds, Yangchenphug Higher Secondary School. This was part of the Education Ministry's drive at the categorization of levels of schools.

In the 70s, the school had a strength of just over 250. During the early 90s, the student number steadily rose to about 500, primarily consisting of resident students and a few day scholars. In 1994, Yangchengphug became a day school. To cope with admissions pressure and accommodate a rising student body, hostel buildings were transformed into classrooms. Today, the school is the largest school in the country with grades ranging from 9-12 and a total strength of over 1500 students, close to 100 faculty members and staff, and 65-acres of property.

The school boasts a powerful alumni body. Urban myth holds that almost 1 in 4 civil servant in the country belong to YHSS. For this reason, the school holds a legendary reputation both within and outside the country. Notable Alumni include His Majesty King Jigme Khesar Namgyel Wangchuck the present king of the country, a host of ministers, secretaries, and executives.

== Courses Offered ==
When it first started in 1965 as a Public school, the school offered Dzongkha, English, History, Math, Science, and Geography. Since the re-categorization of schools under the Ministry of Education in 2001, the school offers a wider range of courses. For 9th and 10th graders, it offers Math, Physics, Chemistry, Biology, History, Geography, English and Dzongkha. The students from these two grades also hold the choice of either opting for Economics or Computer Studies as their elective course. At the end of the academic year, the 10th graders sit for a nationwide standardized test Bhutan Certificate for Secondary Education. Depending on their results, students have 3 fields to choose from. Starting 2013, the school offered all these 3 fields: Science, Commerce, and Humanities. Courses in Science are Physics, Chemistry, Pure Mathematics, English and Dzongkha with the elective subjects being Biology or Computer Studies or neither [in which the case the students don't have to choose either]. Courses in Commerce are Business studies, Accountancy, Business mathematics, English and Dzongkha with elective subjects being Economics or Computer Studies or neither. Courses in Humanities are English, Dzongkha, Geography [These subjects are compulsory], electives include, Dzongkha Literature or English Literature, History or Business Mathematics and Economics.

== Culture ==
"It warms my heart to think that my fellow teachers, both past, and present, and scholars, both past, and present, have lived up to the image of an institution that has to be Yangchenphug," wrote the education minister, Thakur S. Powdyel in one of the volumes of Yangchen Juedmang. Yangchenphug was the first school to introduce the system of providing school identity cards' to the students as well as teachers. The school was the first to have track-suits and T-shirts with colors specific to Houses the students are grouped into. Although this was initially met with some resistance over the choice of wearing the school uniform, "gho" and "kira", the idea proved to be highly effective, especially during sports heats and other social work. This system of designing school track suits is now replicated in many other schools following the noble initiative born in the pioneer school, Yangchenphug. The school color is Blue. The school celebrates a form of Tshechu every year on 2 June coinciding with the National Social Forestry Day. On the day, students present their performances in Traditional Dance and Mask Dance. The School hosts Religious Talks by various Lamas for the benefit of the Buddhist students. In keeping with the religious traditions of the Education Department, the students have assemblies every morning where they sing Buddhist chants. Some non-Buddhist students have voiced out their dismay at this culture but so far, the matter hasn't been dealt with. Each student is given a Guide book at the start of each term which contain the details of Exam dates, Competition dates, Rules and Regulations of the school and the school Motto and vision statement.

== Academics ==
Yangchenphug holds the record for being among the best schools in the country for producing top results every year during the Standardised BSCE and BHSEC tests. The school focuses a lot on the academics of the students and therefore hold a collection of awards for Academic Toppers. The awards are meant to encourage the students to take more interest in studies. The Academic Facet of the school is looked over directly by the Principal. The current principal is Yesh B Ghalley.

== The Old Student's Association of Yangchenphug ==
The Old Student's Association of Yangchenphug or popularly known as TOSA-OY is the alumni association of old students who are now working adults. The alumni association is involved in many collaborative and supportive activities to provide better opportunities to the present students. It also organises the prestigious "Jigme Dorji Wangchuck Memorial Debate" among the higher secondary schools in Thimphu.

Membership to the alumni can be obtained by contacting the office of the school or writing to them at TOSA-OY, PO Box 1086, Thimphu.

== Former Heads and First set of Teachers ==
Name: Thimphu Public School

- 1st Headmaster Oommen (1965–66)
- 1st Set of teachers
- Lop. Dago Tshering Dzongkha
- Dasho Gagay Lham English
- Dorothy Sitling History
- P Girijan Maths & Science
- Ramachandran Geography
- Kaka Dorji Hostel Superintendent
- Classes: KG to IV Strength: 91 (71 boys + 20 girls)
- 2nd Headmaster Kichulo 1967 - 68
- 3rd Headmaster Ramachandran 1968 - 69 4th Headmaster Maj. Sen 1969 ..
- 1st Principal Retd. Col. S. Majumdar 1969 - 71
- 2nd Principal Retd. Col. P.D. Sharma 1972 - 12.9.74 Offtg. Principal D.R. Sharma 12.9.74- 18.11.74 Offtg. Principal K.P. Gupta 18.11.74 - 8.5.75
- 3rd Principal J.B. Tyson 8.5.75 - 7.12.76 Offtg Principal G. Vasudevan 7.12.76 9.4.77 Offtg Principal Mr. R.Subba 9.4.77 18.5.77
- 4th Principal R.D. Singh 18.4.77 16.4.82
- 5th Principal K.George Ipe 16.4.82 â€" 8.4.88
- 6th Principal Namgay Om 8.4.88 â€" 19.3.90 (First lady & National Principal)
- 7th Principal Tshewang Tandin 19.3.90 - 27.10.98 (Second National Principal)
- 8th Principal Karma Yeshey 27.10.98 - 20.12.2003 (Third National and Principal)
- 9th Principal Kaka Tshering 20.12.2003-12.12.2006) (Fourth National Principal)
- 10th Principal Pema C. Wangdi 2007- 2017 (Fifth National Principal & Second Lady Principal)
- 11th Principal Yesh B Ghalley 2019–present

== Notable students ==
- Khendum Choden, writer
- Pawo Choyning Dorji, filmmaker and photographer
- Karma Phuntsho, scholar
- Chimi Yangzom Wangchuck, Princess of Bhutan, Vice President of the Bhutan Youth Development Foundation
- Dechen Yangzom Wangchuck, Princess of Bhutan, Representative of His Majesty The King for people's welfare in Mongar
- Jigme Dorji Wangchuck, Prince of Bhutan, Representative of His Majesty The King in the Eastern Region of Bhutan
- Jigme Khesar Namgyel Wangchuck, King of Bhutan, 5th Druk Gyalpo
- Jigyel Ugyen Wangchuck, Prince of Bhutan, President of Bhutan Olympic Committee
- Kesang Choden Wangchuck, Princess of Bhutan, executive director of Bhutan's Thangka Conservation Center
- Khamsum Singye Wangchuck, Prince of Bhutan, Commissioned as 2nd-Lieutenant Royal Bhutan Army
- Sonam Dechen Wangchuck, Princess of Bhutan, President of the Bhutan National Legal Institute
