= Jigyel Ugyen Wangchuck =

Bhutanese prince

Prince Dasho Jigyel Ugyen Wangchuck
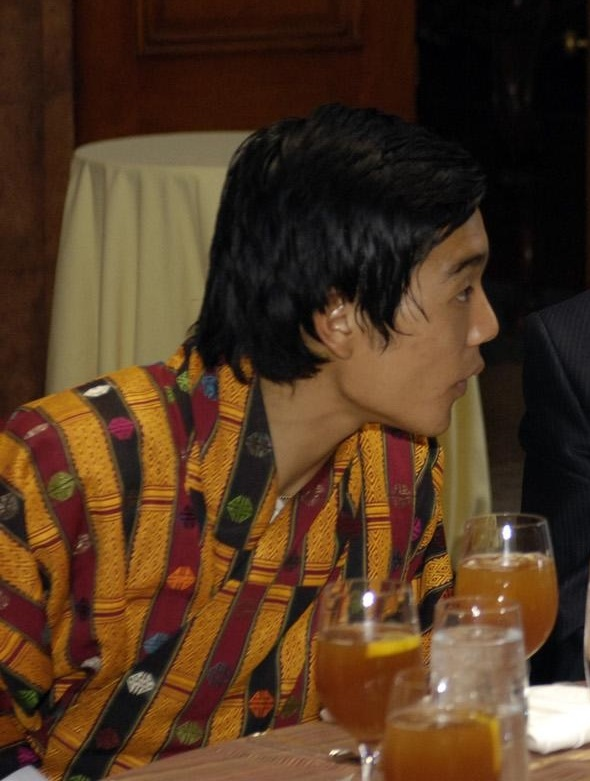
- Jigyel Ugyen Wangchuck welcomes visitors in Washington in 2008
- Born: 16 July 1984 (age 41); New Delhi, India
- Spouse: Ashi Ugen Choden Namgyel (m. 2025)
- House: Wangchuck
- Father: Jigme Singye Wangchuck
- Mother: Dorji Wangmo
- Religion: Vajrayana Buddhism

Prince Dasho Jigyel Ugyen Wangchuck (born 16 July 1984) is a Bhutanese prince.

Born the second son of the King of Bhutan Jigme Singye Wangchuck, he was the heir presumptive to the throne of Bhutan until the birth, on 5 February 2016, of his nephew Jigme Namgyel Wangchuck, the son of his older half-brother and current King Jigme Khesar Namgyel Wangchuck.

== Early life ==
Prince Jigyel Ugyen is the second son of King Jigme Singye Wangchuck from Queen Mother Ashi Dorji Wangmo Wangchuck. He has an older sister, Princess Ashi Sonam Dechen Wangchuck, as well as four half-brothers and four half-sisters.

== Education ==
He was educated at Yangchenphug Higher Secondary School, then Choate Rosemary Hall in Wallingford, Connecticut, USA, graduating in 2003. He read Modern History and Political Science at St Peter's College, Oxford, in the United Kingdom starting in 2003 and graduating in 2007.

== Royal duties ==
Sharing responsibilities with his siblings, Prince Jigyel Ugyen travels extensively to represent the King in various functions in Bhutan as well as abroad. In 2008 he travelled to the Smithsonian Folklife Festival where he delivered an opening address before roaming the festival area, and interacting with visitors. At the end of the festival, he travelled with several performers to attend the Bhutan Festival 2008 at the University of Texas at El Paso.

As the King's representative and President to the Bhutan Olympic Committee (BOC), he visited Copenhagen in order to attend the XIII Olympic Congress in 2009.

Queen Mother Ashi Dorji Wangmo Wangchuck of Bhutan at St Peter's College, Oxford, attending the graduation ceremony of her son, Prince Dasho Jigyel Ugyen Wangchuck (left) on 29 September 2007

He was appointed to the Chairmanship during the 34th General Assembly of the Olympic Council of Asia, held in Ashgabat, Turkmenistan and will chair the committee for four years from 2015 to 2019. On 9 October 2018, His Royal Highness was elected as an International Olympic Committee member, whose candidature was linked to a function within the NOC, that is the Bhutan Olympic Committee.

== Personal life ==
He and his brothers share interests in various sporting activities, such as archery, basketball, golf, football and cycling.

He initiated the Tour of the Dragon in Bhutan, a mountain bike race covering 268 km, from central to western Bhutan in 2010.

=== Wedding ===
Prince Jigyel Ugyen Wangchuck married Ugen Choden Namgyel (daughter of Singye Namgyel and Tshering Lhamo) on 25 August 2025, in a ceremony held at Dechencholing Palace in Thimphu. They received the blessings from The King, The former King, and others members of the Royal Family.

== Humanitarian causes ==
The prince with his sister, Princess Ashi Sonam Dechen, are collaborating in the Tarayana Foundation (TF) as board members. Founded by their mother, Queen Mother Ashi Dorji Wangmo, the foundation focuses on various efforts to reduce poverty in Bhutan. The prince is also the founder of Bhutan Philanthropy Ventures, a social enterprise established to support the Tarayana Foundation.

== See also ==
- House of Wangchuck
- Line of succession to the Bhutanese throne

== Notes ==
Jigyel Ugyen Wangchuck House of Wangchuck Born: 16 July 1984
Lines of succession
Preceded by Sonam Yangden Wangchuck	Line of succession to the Bhutanese throne 4th position	Succeeded by Khamsum Singye Wangchuck
