= Kesang =

Kesang may refer to:

- Kesang, Johor, a town in Tangkak District, Johor
- Kesang River, in Malaysia
- Kesang Marstrand, an American folk singer, songwriter, and guitarist
- Kesang Choden Wangchuck, a member of the royal family of Bhutan (sister of the current king)
- Kesang Choden Wangchuck, a member of the royal family of Bhutan (grandmother of the current king)
