= Royal Botanical Garden, Serbithang =

Coordinates: 27°30′27″N 89°45′09″E

The Royal Botanical Garden is a botanical garden located at Serbithang, Thimphu, Bhutan. It is a few kilometers walk from the city and is accessible through Babesa-Serbithang Highway by bus or taxi or half an hour walk on foot from Babesa.

== Background ==
The idea for the establishment of the botanical garden was laid by Her Majesty Ashi Sangay Choden Wangchuck to commemorate the silver jubilee of His Majesty The Fourth King, Jigme Singye Wangchuck, of Bhutan. It is an institutional area that has a total area of about 32 acres (13 hectares) with a living collection of plant diversity in the country.

The garden has currently over 800 species of native plants in its collection, managed by technical staff with basic taxonomic and horticulture skills.
