= Ugyen Jigme Wangchuck =

Bhutanese royal

Prince Dasho Ugyen Jigme Wangchuck
- Born: 11 November 1994 (age 31); Thimphu, Bhutan
- House: Wangchuck
- Father: Jigme Singye Wangchuck
- Mother: Tshering Pem
- Religion: Buddhism

Prince Dasho Ugyen Jigme Wangchuck (Dzongkha: ཨོ་རྒྱན་འཇིགས་མེད་དབང་ཕྱུག, born 11 November 1994) is a member of the royal family of Bhutan and is the youngest of the sons of the fourth King of Bhutan Jigme Singye Wangchuck and his wife, Queen Mother Ashi Tshering Pem Wangchuck.

== Royal duties ==
Ugyen Jigme Wangchuck has participated in a large amount of official royal matters including foreign affairs meetings. From 2008 Prince Dasho Ugyen Jigme Wangchuck has been educated in the exclusive Swiss boarding school, Institut Le Rosey. He attended the Early Learning Center in Thimphu, Bhutan, before going to Switzerland. He has graduated high school. He has graduated university from Central Saint Martins in 2019. He has two full sisters, Princess Ashi Chimi Yangzom Wangchuck, and Princess Ashi Kesang Choden Wangchuck, as well as 7 other half-siblings, including Jigme Khesar Namgyel Wangchuck.

He was granted the Royal Scarf in 2021 marking the shouldering of Royal Duties and responsibilities in service of the nation.

He is active member of DeSuups, an organization made up of volunteers who go to the areas affected by some cataclysm or in charity events and who wear a familiar orange uniform to be easily recognizable. They are known as "Guardians of Peace".

== Honours ==
- Bhutan :
  - Commemorative Silver Jubilee Medal of King Jigme Singye (02/06/1999).
  - King Jigme Khesar Investiture Medal (06/11/2008).
  - Centenary of the Monarchy Commemorative Medal (06/11/2008).
  - 60th Birthday Badge Medal of King Jigme Singye (11/11/2015).
  - The Royal Red Scarf (17/12/2021).

== See also ==
- House of Wangchuck
- Line of succession to the Bhutanese throne

== Notes ==
Ugyen Jigme Wangchuck House of Wangchuck Born: 11 November 1994
Bhutanese royalty
Preceded by Decho Pema Wangchuck	Line of succession to the Bhutanese throne 8th position	Succeeded by Chimi Yangzom Wangchuck
