= Khamsum Singye Wangchuck =

Bhutanese prince (born 1985)

Prince Dasho Khamsum Singye Wangchuck
- Born: 6 October 1985 (age 39)
- House: Wangchuck
- Father: Jigme Singye Wangchuck
- Mother: Sangay Choden
- Religion: Buddhism

Prince Dasho Khamsum Singye Wangchuck (Dzongkha: ཁམས་གསུམ་སེང་གེ་དབང་ཕྱུག, Wylie: khams-gsum seng-ge dbang-phyug, born 6 October 1985) is a prince of Bhutan. He is the son of the fourth King of Bhutan Jigme Singye Wangchuck and his wife, Queen Mother Ashi Sangay Choden Wangchuck. He is the half-brother and cousin of the fifth King, Jigme Khesar Namgyel Wangchuck.

== Education ==
He was educated at Lungtenzampa Middle Secondary School, Yangchenphug Higher Secondary School and Royal Military Academy Sandhurst.

== Military career ==
He was commissioned in the Royal Bhutan Army as 2nd-Lieutenant (16 December 2005).

== See also ==
- Line of succession to the Bhutanese throne

Khamsum Singye Wangchuck House of Wangchuck Born: 6 October 1985
Bhutanese royalty
Preceded by Jigyel Ugyen Wangchuck	Line of succession to the Bhutanese throne 5th position	Succeeded by Jigme Dorji Wangchuck
