= Chimi Yangzom Wangchuck =

Princess of Bhutan (born 1980)

Princess Ashi Chimi Yangzom Wangchuck
- Born: 10 January 1980 (age 45)
- Spouse: Dasho Sangay Wangchuck (m. 2005)
- Issue: Dasho Jigme Ugyen Wangchuck; Dasho Jamyang Singye Wangchuck
- House: Wangchuck
- Father: Jigme Singye Wangchuck
- Mother: Tshering Pem
- Religion: Buddhism

Princess Ashi Chimi Yangzom Wangchuck (Dzongkha: འཆི་མེད་དབྱངས་འཛོམས་དབང་ཕྱུག, Wylie: vchi med dbyangs vdzoms dbang phyug, born 10 January 1980) is a princess of Bhutan. She is the daughter of the fourth King of Bhutan Jigme Singye Wangchuck and Queen Mother Ashi Tshering Pem Wangchuck. She is a half-sister of the fifth King, Jigme Khesar Namgyel Wangchuck.

== Biography ==
Her Royal Highness was educated at Luntenzampa Middle Secondary School and Yangchenphug Higher Secondary School, Dana Hall School.

Later, she completed a bachelor's degree with double majors in international relations and economics from Wellesley College in Massachusetts and a master's degree in public administration from Columbia University in New York City. She is interested in working with youth.

== Marriage and children ==
She married Dasho Sangay Wangchuck on 13 October 2005 at the Dechencholing Palace. Dasho Sangay Wangchuck (born in 1978 in Thimphu), whose family belongs to the first generation of Bhutanese industrialists, completed a master's degree in public administration and global affairs at Columbia University. He is the eldest son of Kinley Wangchuck, by his wife, Sangay Om.

They have two sons:

- Dasho Jigme Ugyen Wangchuck (born at Samitivej Sukhumvit Hospital, Bangkok, Thailand, 30 August 2006).
- Dasho Jamyang Singye Wangchuck (born 2 December 2009).

== Patronages ==
- Vice President of the Bhutan Youth Development Foundation (YDF).
- Royal Patron of the Bhutan Ecological Society (BES).

== See also ==
- House of Wangchuck
- Line of succession to the Bhutanese throne

Chimi Yangzom Wangchuck House of Wangchuck Born: 10 January 1980
Bhutanese royalty
Preceded by Ugyen Jigme Wangchuck	Line of succession to the Bhutanese throne 9th position	Succeeded by Jigme Ugyen Wangchuk
