= Ugyen Academy =

Information
- Website: ugyenacademy.edu.bt

Ugyen Academy (UA) is a private school located in Punakha, Bhutan, for classes VII-XII.

== History ==
Ugyen Academy opened on April 3, 2002 with 154 students. The school was founded by His Excellency Yab Dasho Ugyen Dorji (father of the four Queen Mothers Dorji Wangmo, Tshering Pem, Tshering Yangdon and Sangay Choden Wangchuck of Bhutan, and the former prime minister, Lyonpo Sangay Ngedup). It started as a pet project of the honorable Dasho Yab Ugyen Dorji (1925–2019) and Yum Thinley Choden. It was a wish fulfilled for the local people and a hope for the students who did not meet the government cut off point. The school made steady progress, and the enrollment rise year by year. It is the first and only authentic international school in the Kingdom where wholesome education is offer.

== Location ==
UA is situated within Khuruthang town (Punakha District). It is located between Khuruthang Middle Secondary School and Khuruthang town, which is 4 km away from Punakha Dzong.

== About the principal ==
Norbu Gyaltshen has been the principal of the school since its establishment in 2002. He has a degree certificate and a master's in science from the University of New England, New South Wales. He is also the recipient of the university's Honours Roll for the project Mission Possible, UNE, NSW. He served as a teacher for 27 years and as a tutor to His Majesty the Fifth King Jigme Khesar Namgyel Wangchuck of Bhutan. He received a precious award as an educationist. He became the first recipient of a white kabney without fringes and a patang from His Majesty. The honor was granted in recognition of the important role he played and for being the epitome of a teacher in the nation.

== Education and academics ==
The school welcomes students from all over the country and does not exclude international scholars. It also provides opportunities for international students. There are students from Thailand, India, and South Korea studying regular classes. The teaching faculty consists of 47 members, which include 32 experienced Bhutanese teachers and 5 professional Indian teachers. Academics has always been the topmost priority and concern for Ugyen Academy. It is one of the best private schools. It also holds the record for being among the best schools in the country for producing top results every year during the standardized BCSE (Bhutan Certificate of Secondary Education) and BHSEC (Bhutan Higher Secondary Education Certificate) exams. It is among the top schools in the country at both the middle school level and the high school level. The school started to maintain consistency and give the best.

== Sports ==
The school has always been giving the top priority to academics without diminishing the wholesome education and co-curricular activities. Not only academics but also UA is very popular in games and sports both at the school level and at the national level. Students enjoy the facility of sports in UA such as football, volleyball, swimming, cricket, and many indoor games. UA also focuses on sports and participates with hope at the dzongkhag level and national level and dominated the 7th National School Games with the highest number of medals held in Khuruthang Middle Secondary School and Ugyen Academy in Punakha. Football is the most popular game played by the students. It is the only educational institution to take part in Bhutan Premier League with the name Ugyen Academy FC. UA also represented Bhutan in the 2014 AFC President's Cup.
