= Tseyring Pem =

Queen of Bhutan from 1979 to 2006

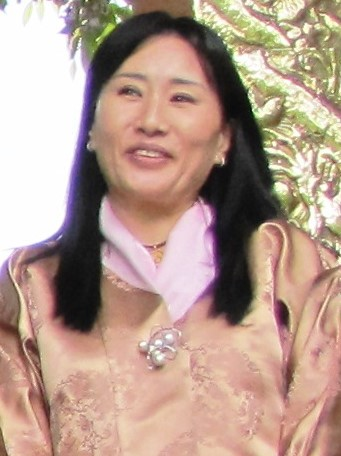
- Tseyring Pem in 2010

Queen consort of Bhutan
- Tenure: 1979 – 9 December 2006
- Co-queens consort: Dorji Wangmo; Tshering Yangdon; Sangay Choden
- Born: 22 December 1957 (age 68); Nobgang, Punakha, Bhutan
- Spouse: Jigme Singye Wangchuck (m. 1979)
- Issue: Chimi Yangzom Wangchuck; Kesang Choden Wangchuck; Ugyen Jigme Wangchuck
Names
- Tseyring Pem Wangchuck (Note: Women in Bhutan retain their names upon marriage.)
- House: Wangchuck (by marriage)
- Father: Yab Dasho Ugyen Dorji
- Mother: Yum Thuiji Zam
- Religion: Vajrayana Buddhism

Tseyring Pem Wangchuck (Dzongkha: ཚེ་རིང་པད་མ, Wylie: tshe ring pad ma; born 22 December 1957) is one of the four wives and queens of Bhutanese king Jigme Singye Wangchuck, who ruled until his abdication in 2006. She is the Queen Mother (Gyalyum Kude) of Bhutan.

== Biography ==
Her father, Yab Dasho Ugyen Dorji (1925–2019), was the Founder and Proprietor of Ugyen Academy (UA) (03/04/2002).

She was educated at St. Joseph's Convent, Kalimpong, and St. Helen's School, Kurseong, India.

The name Tshering means "long life".

== Children ==
She had, with the former king, the following children:

Name	Birth	Marriage		Issue
Princess Ashi; Chimi Yangzom Wangchuck (Photo)	10 January 1980 (age 46)	13 October 2005	Dasho Sangay Wangchuck	Dasho Jigme Ugyen Wangchuck (ca. September 2006 (age 20)) Dasho Jamyang Singye Wangchuck (2009 (age 16–17))
Princess Ashi; Kesang Choden Wangchuck (Photo)	23 January 1982 (age 44)	11 November 2008	Dasho Palden Yoser Thinley	Dasho Jamgyel Singye Wangchuck Dasho Ugyen Junay Wangchuck Ashi Tshering Tshoyang Wangchuck (ca. January 2019 (age 7))
Prince Dasho; Ugyen Jigme Wangchuck (Photo)	11 November 1994 (age 32)			

== Patronages ==
- Co-chairman of the Bhutan Foundation.
- President of the Bhutan Youth Development Foundation (YDF).

== Honours ==
- United States :
  - Champion of Rising Leaders Award by Teton Science Schools [TSS] (17 October 2023).

== Honorary degrees ==
She received an honorary doctorate from Murdoch University in 2025.

== See also ==
- House of Wangchuck
- Line of succession to the Bhutanese throne

== Notes ==
Tseyring Pem House of Wangchuck Born: 29 December 1957
Bhutanese royalty
Preceded by Kesang Choden	Queen consort of Bhutan; 1979–2006 with Dorji Wangmo; Tshering Yangdon; Sangay Choden	Succeeded by Jetsun Pema
Preceded by Kesang Choden	Queen Mother of Bhutan; 2006–present with Dorji Wangmo; Tshering Yangdon; Sangay Choden	Incumbent
