= Euphelma Choden Wangchuck =

Bhutanese princess

Princess Ashi Euphelma Choden
- Born: 6 June 1993 (age 32)
- Spouse: Dasho Thinley Norbu (m. 2020)
- House: Wangchuck
- Father: Jigme Singye Wangchuck
- Mother: Sangay Choden
- Religion: Buddhism

Princess Ashi Euphelma Choden Wangchuck (born 6 June 1993) is a princess of Bhutan. She is the daughter of the fourth King of Bhutan Jigme Singye Wangchuck and his wife, Queen Mother Sangay Choden Wangchuck. She is half-sister of the fifth King, Jigme Khesar Namgyel Wangchuck.

== Biography ==
Princess Euphelma Choden Wangchuck is the youngest daughter of the fourth King of Bhutan -- currently the King-Father of Bhutan. She studied Sociology at Georgetown University in the United States, graduating in 2016.

== Marriage and children ==
On 29 October 2020, she married Dasho Thinley Norbu at Dechencholing Palace. He was born to Dhondup Gyaltshen and Sonam Choki in 1992, and is the younger brother of Her Majesty The Gyaltsuen, Jetsun Pema Wangchuck. After graduating from St. Stephen's College, Delhi in Delhi University, Thinley Norbu trained as a pilot (as his father) has been flying for the National Airline Druk Air since 2019.

Both Euphelma Choden and Thinley Norbu are active members of DeSuups, an organization made up of volunteers who go to the areas affected by some cataclysm or in charity events and who wear a familiar orange uniform to be easily recognizable. They are known as "Guardians of Peace".

== Patronages ==
- President of the Bhutan Paralympic Committee (BPC) since 2018.
- Chairman of the Gyalyum (Queen Mother) Charitable Trust.
- Patron of Red Dot Bhutan since 2021.

== See also ==
- Line of succession to the Bhutanese throne

Euphelma Choden Wangchuck House of Wangchuck Born: 6 June 1993
Bhutanese royalty
Preceded by Tshering Tshoyang Wangchuck	Line of succession to the Bhutanese throne 23nd position	Succeeded by –
