= Zangdopelri Monastery =

Buddhist monastery in Bhutan

Religion
- Affiliation: Tibetan Buddhism

Location
- Location: Bhutan
- Country: Bhutan

Zangdopelri Monastery also known as Zangdokpalri Monastery is a Tibetan Buddhist monastery in Bhutan. It took seven years to build, and was completed in 2009 by the support of Queen Kesang Choden of Bhutan.

== Name ==
The name zangdokpalri means copper mountain and is the heavenly abode of guru rinpoche in Tibetan legends.
