= Sangay Choden =

Queen of Bhutan from 1979 to 2006

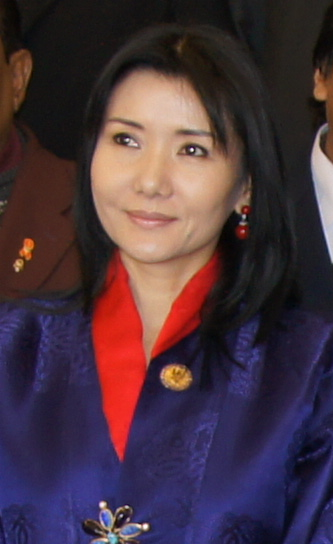
- Sangay Choden in 2011

Queen consort of Bhutan
- Tenure: 1979 – 9 December 2006
- Co-queens consort: Dorji Wangmo; Tshering Pem; Tshering Yangdon
- Born: 11 May 1963 (age 63); Nobgang, Punakha, Bhutan
- Spouse: Jigme Singye Wangchuck (m. 1979)
- Issue: Khamsum Singye Wangchuck; Euphelma Choden Wangchuck
Names
- Sangay Choden Wangchuck (Note: Women in Bhutan retain their names upon marriage.)
- House: Wangchuck (by marriage)
- Father: Dasho Yab Ugyen Dorji
- Mother: Yum Thuiji Zam
- Religion: Buddhism

Sangay Choden (Dzongkha: སངས་རྒྱས་ཆོས་ལྡན, Wylie: sangs-rgyas chos-ldan, born 11 May 1963) is one of the four wives and queens of the 4th king Jigme Singye Wangchuck, who ruled in Bhutan from 1972 until his abdication in 2006. She is the Queen Mother (Gyalyum Kude) of Bhutan.

== Biography ==
Her father, Yab Dasho Ugyen Dorji (1925–2019), was the Founder and Proprietor of Ugyen Academy (UA) (03/04/2002). Her mother is Yum Thuiji Zam (b. 1932). Yum Thuiji Zam Charity School in Thimphu District is named after her.

She was educated at St. Joseph's Convent, Kalimpong, and St. Helen's School, Kurseong, India.

Her three brothers are:

- Lyonpo Sangay Ngedup (b. 1953), former Prime Minister of Bhutan.
- Dasho Ugyen Tsechup (b. 1964).
- Dasho Topgay (b. 1966).

Her five sisters are (three of them are the other Queen Mothers):

- Ashi Beda (b. 1951).
- HM Ashi Dorji Wangmo (b. 1955).
- HM Ashi Tshering Pem (b. 1957).
- HM Ashi Tshering Yangdon (b. 1959), mother of King Jigme Khesar Namgyel Wangchuck.
- Ashi Sonam Choden (b. 1969).

Sangay Choden was appointed the United Nations Population Fund’s (UNFPA) Goodwill Ambassador in Bhutan in 1999.

I support the all around development of our younger generations, in whose hands lie the future of our country.

Sangay Choden is particularly interested in promoting the arts in Bhutan and advocating the country's rich cultural heritage. She is the patron of the Bhutan Textile Museum in Thimphu which she helped establish in 2001.

Her Majesty also established the Tara Lhadron Zhingkham Lhakhang, a temple dedicated to the 21 Taras located in the historically and spiritually significant temple grounds of Parigzampa Astrology School in Dechencholing, Thimphu.

On 1 July 2011 she visited the Alhambra with her daughter, Princess Ashi Euphelma Choden Wangchuck.

== Children ==
She had, with the former king, the following children:

Name	Birth	Marriage		Issue
Prince Dasho; Khamsum Singye Wangchuck (Photo)	6 October 1985 (age 41)			
Princess Ashi; Euphelma Choden Wangchuck (Photo)	6 June 1993 (age 33)	29 October 2020	Dasho Thinley Norbu	

== Patronages ==
- Royal Patron of the Bhutan Textile Museum.
- Chairman of the Royal Textile Academy of Bhutan (RTAB).
- Founder and President of RENEW (Respect, Educate, Nurture and Empower Women) since 2004.
- Goodwill Ambassador for UNFPA since 1999.
- President of the Gyalyum (Queen Mother) Charitable Trust.

== Honours ==
- United States :
  - United Nations Population Award (Individual Category, 10 December 2020).

== See also ==
- House of Wangchuck
- Line of succession to the Bhutanese throne

== Notes ==
Sangay Choden House of Wangchuck Born: 11 May 1963
Bhutanese royalty
Preceded by Kesang Choden	Queen consort of Bhutan; 1979–2006 with Dorji Wangmo; Tshering Pem; Tshering Yangdon	Succeeded by Jetsun Pema
Preceded by Kesang Choden	Queen Mother of Bhutan; 2006–present with Dorji Wangmo; Tshering Pem; Tshering Yangdon	Incumbent
