= Succession to the Bhutanese throne =

Golden Throne of Bhutan.

The line of succession to the throne of Bhutan is based on the constitution of Bhutan. Currently the line of succession is according to male-preference cognatic primogeniture with males preceding females who are in the same degree of kinship. If the heir apparent has reached the age of majority of 21, the monarch would step down at age 65. If the heir apparent and the nearest people in the line of succession are deemed unsuitable, it is up to the monarch to decide who will be the next heir. If the monarch violates the constitution, they must abdicate.

== Order of succession ==
- King Jigme Singye, The Fourth Druk Gyalpo (b. 1955)
  - King Jigme Khesar Namgyel, The Fifth Druk Gyalpo (b. 1980)
    - (1) Prince Jigme Namgyel, The Druk Gyalsey (b. 2016)
    - (2) Prince Jigme Ugyen (b. 2020)
    - (3) Princess Sonam Yangden (b. 2023)
  - (4) Prince Jigyel Ugyen (b. 1984)
  - (5) Prince Khamsum Singye (b. 1985)
  - (6) Prince Jigme Dorji, The Gyaltshab (b. 1986)
    - (7) Ashi Decho Pema (b. 2014)
    - (8) Ashi N.
    - (9) Dasho N.
  - (10) Prince Ugyen Jigme (b. 1994)
  - (11) Princess Chimi Yangzom (b. 1980)
    - (12) Dasho Jigme Ugyen (b. 2006)
    - (13) Dasho Jamyang Singye (b. 2009)
  - (14) Princess Sonam Dechen (b. 1981)
    - (15) Dasho Jigje Singye (b. 2009)
    - (16) Dasho Jigme Jigten (b. 2013)
  - (17) Princess Dechen Yangzom (b. 1981)
    - (18) Dasho Ugyen Dorji
    - (19) Dasho Jigme Singye
    - (20) Ashi Dechen Yuidem Yangzom
  - (21) Princess Kesang Choden (b. 1982)
    - (22) Dasho Jamgyel Singye
    - (23) Dasho Ugyen Junay
    - (24) Ashi Tshering Tshoyang (b. 2019)
  - (25) Princess Euphelma Choden (b. 1993)

== Notes ==
The list is composed of the nearest family of the current monarch. The actual line of succession may be much longer as there could be other legitimate descendants of King Ugyen Wangchuck.

== Eligibility ==
The legitimate descendants of King Ugyen Wangchuck are presently entitled to succeed. If a king dies leaving a pregnant wife, the unborn child will automatically assume a place in the line of succession if there is no male heir. A person loses his or her succession rights if he or she marries a person who is not a natural-born Bhutanese citizen.

== Regency ==
If the successor to the throne has not reached the age of majority of 21 or is mentally or physically incapable of performing his functions, there are two possible outcomes:

- The heir presumptive having reached the age of majority would serve as regent until the regency is not needed.
- The Council of Regency would exercise the royal prerogatives of the king under the constitution if an eligible heir presumptive or other suitable member of the royal family is not available.

== Council of Regency ==
The council of regency is composed of:

- A senior member of the Royal Family nominated by the Privy Council
- The Prime Minister
- The Chief Justice of Bhutan
- The Speaker
- The Chairperson of the National Council
- The Leader of the Opposition Party

The members of the Council of Regency must take an oath of allegiance before parliament to faithfully discharge their duties.

The Privy Council consists of two members appointed by the monarch (or previous monarch if the current monarch hasn't appointed any), one member nominated by the Council of Ministers (Lhengye Zhungtshog) and one member nominated by the National Council.

== See also ==
- Royal Family of Bhutan
