= Dorji Wangmo =

Queen of Bhutan from 1979 to 2006

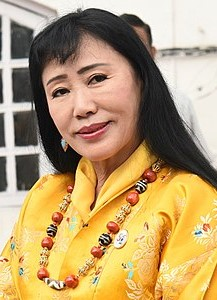
- Dorji Wangmo in 2018

Queen consort of Bhutan
- Tenure: 1979 – 9 December 2006
- Co-queens consort: Tshering Pem; Tshering Yangdon; Sangay Choden
- Born: 10 June 1955 (age 71); Nobgang, Punakha, Bhutan
- Spouse: Jigme Singye Wangchuck (m. 1979)
- Issue: Sonam Dechen Wangchuck; Jigyel Ugyen Wangchuck
Names
- Dorji Wangmo Wangchuck (Note: Women in Bhutan retain their names upon marriage.)
- House: Wangchuck (by marriage)
- Father: Yab Dasho Ugyen Dorji
- Mother: Yum Thuji Zam
- Religion: Vajrayana Buddhism

Dorji Wangmo Wangchuck (Dzongkha: རྡོ་རྗེ་དབང་མོ་དབང་ཕྱུག་, Wylie: Rdo-rje Dbang-mo Dbang-phyug; born 10 June 1955) is the Queen Mother (Gyalyum Kude) of Bhutan, and first wife of former king Jigme Singye Wangchuck, who also married three of her sisters; all four sisters were entitled to be called queen.

== Biography ==
Her father, Yab Dasho Ugyen Dorji (1929–2016), was the Founder and Proprietor of Ugyen Academy (UA) (03/04/2002). Her mother is Yum Thuiji Zam (b. 1932). Yum Thuiji Zam Charity School in Thimphu District is named after her.

Ashi Dorji Wangmo Wangchuck is the first wife of King Jigme Singye Wangchuck, the Fourth King of Bhutan.

She was educated at St. Helen's School, Kurseong, India.

She is the mother of Princess Ashi Sonam Dechen Wangchuck and Prince Dasho Jigyel Ugyen Wangchuck.

== Activities ==
Queen Mother Ashi Dorji Wangmo Wangchuck of Bhutan at St Peter's College, Oxford, attending the graduation ceremony of her son, Prince Dasho Jigyel Ugyen Wangchuck (left) on 29 September 2007

The Queen Mother has sponsored and edited a number of books on poetry and essays on national issues. She is the author of Of Rainbows and Clouds a story of Dasho Yab Ugyen Dorji (the Queen’s Father). Her second book, Treasures of the Thunder Dragon: A Portrait of Bhutan, is a blend of personal memoir, history, folklore and travelogue. Her third book, Dochula: A Spiritual Abode in Bhutan, is a documentation of the Druk Wangyel Complex consisting of the Lungchutse Lhakhang, 108 Druk Wangyel Stupas, the Druk Wangyel Lhakhang and the Druk Wangyel Tshechu.

She was honoured with the Pope Francis Charity and Leadership Award at a ceremony, in recognition of the work done by Her Majesty’s Tarayana Foundation under her leadership.

== Children ==
She had, with the former king, the following children:

Name	Birth	Marriage		Issue
Princess Ashi; Sonam Dechen Wangchuck (Photo)	5 August 1981 (age 45)	5 April 2009	Dasho Phub W. Dorji	Dasho Jigje Singye Wangchuck (3 December 2009 (age 16)) Dasho Jigme Jigten Wangchuck (23 August 2013 (age 13))
Prince Dasho; Jigyel Ugyen Wangchuck (Photo)	6 July 1984 (age 42)	25 August 2025	Ugen Choden Namgyel	

== Selected works ==
- Of Rainbows and Clouds: The Life of Yab Ugyen Dorji as told to His Daughter (1998).
- Treasures of the Thunder Dragon: A Portrait of Bhutan (2006).
- Dochula: A Spiritual Abode in Bhutan (2015).

== Patronages ==
- Chief Patron to Ministry of Agriculture and Livestock since 1999.
- Chief Patron of “Bhutan Echoes: Drukyul's Arts & Literature Festival”.
- Honorary President of Sherubtse College since 2000.
- President and Founder of the Tarayana Foundation (TF) since 2003.
- Patron of the Folk Heritage Museum (FHM) [Phelchey Toenkhyim] since 2001.

== Honours ==
- United States :
  - (Italy) Caritas in Veritate International: Pope Francis Award for Charity & Leadership (22 October 2016).

== Notes ==
Dorji Wangmo House of Wangchuck Born: 29 December 1955
Bhutanese royalty
Preceded by Kesang Choden	Queen consort of Bhutan; 1979–2006 with Tshering Pem; Tshering Yangdon; Sangay Choden	Succeeded by Jetsun Pema
Preceded by Kesang Choden	Queen Mother of Bhutan; 2006–present with Tshering Pem; Tshering Yangdon; Sangay Choden	Incumbent
