= Tshering Yangdon =

Queen of Bhutan from 1979 to 2006

- Tshering Yangdon in 2005

Queen consort of Bhutan
- Tenure: 1979 – 9 December 2006
- Co-queens consort: Dorji Wangmo; Tshering Pem; Sangay Choden
- Born: 21 June 1959 (age 67); Nobgang, Punakha, Bhutan
- Spouse: Jigme Singye Wangchuck (m. 1979)
- Issue: Jigme Khesar Namgyel Wangchuck; Dechen Yangzom Wangchuck; Jigme Dorji Wangchuck
Names
- Tshering Yangdon Wangchuck (Note: Women in Bhutan retain their names upon marriage.)
- House: Wangchuck (by marriage)
- Father: Yab Dasho Ugyen Dorji
- Mother: Yum Thuiji Zam
- Religion: Buddhism

Tshering Yangdon (Dzongkha: ཚེ་རིང་དབྱང་སྒྲོན, born 21 June 1959) is the third wife of the former Bhutanese king, Jigme Singye Wangchuck. She is the Queen Mother (Gyalyum Kude) of Bhutan, as the mother of the current Bhutanese king Jigme Khesar Namgyel Wangchuck. She is also the mother of King Jigme Khesar's two younger full siblings, Princess Ashi Dechen Yangzom (b. 1981) and Prince Gyaltshab Jigme Dorji (b. 1986).

== Biography ==
Her father, Yab Dasho Ugyen Dorji (1925–2019), was the founder and proprietor of Ugyen Academy (UA) (03/04/2002). Her mother is Yum Thuiji Zam (b. 1932). Yum Thuiji Zam Charity School in Thimphu District is named after her.

She was educated at St. Joseph's Convent, Kalimpong, and St. Helen's School, Kurseong, India.

Yangdon is a gardener and artist, doing things such as painting and sketching.

== Humanitarian causes ==
The Queen founded Bhutan Nun's Foundation (BNF) in March 2009. The foundation's focus is to make nunneries a way to help and empower girls and women through education and economic self-sufficiency.

She was responsible for the building of the Khamsum Yulley Namgyal Chörten in Punakha Valley in 2004.

== Children ==
She had, with the former king, the following children:

Name	Birth	Marriage		Issue
King Druk Gyalpo; Jigme Khesar Namgyel Wangchuck	21 February 1980 (age 46)	13 October 2011	Ashi Jetsun Pema	Crown Prince Druk Gyalsey; Jigme Namgyel Wangchuck (5 February 2016 (age 10)) Prince Dasho Jigme Ugyen Wangchuck (19 March 2020 (age 6)) Princess Ashi Sonam Yangden Wangchuck (9 September 2023) (age 3 years)
Princess Ashi; Dechen Yangzom Wangchuck (Photo)	2 December 1981 (age 44)	29 October 2009	Dasho Tandin Namgyel	Ashi Dechen Yuidem Yangzom Wangchuck Dasho Ugyen Dorji Wangchuck Dasho Jigme Singye Wangchuck
Prince Gyaltshab; Jigme Dorji Wangchuck (Photo)	14 April 1986 (age 40)	17 October 2013	Ashi Yeatso Lhamo	Ashi Decho Pema Wangchuck (2014 (age 11–12))

== Patronages ==
- Royal Patron of the Royal Society for the Protection and Care of Animals.
- Royal Patron of the Royal Bhutan Flower Exhibition.

== Honours ==
- Outstanding Women in Buddhism Award [The International Women's Meditation Center Foundation] (2007).

== Notes ==
Tshering Yangdon House of Wangchuck Born: 21 June 1959
Bhutanese royalty
Preceded by Kesang Choden	Queen consort of Bhutan; 1979–2006 with Dorji Wangmo; Tshering Pem; Sangay Choden	Succeeded by Jetsun Pema
Preceded by Kesang Choden	Queen Mother of Bhutan; 2006–present with Dorji Wangmo; Tshering Pem; Sangay Choden	Incumbent
