= Sonam Dechen Wangchuck =

Bhutanese royal princess

Princess Sonam Dechen Wangchuck
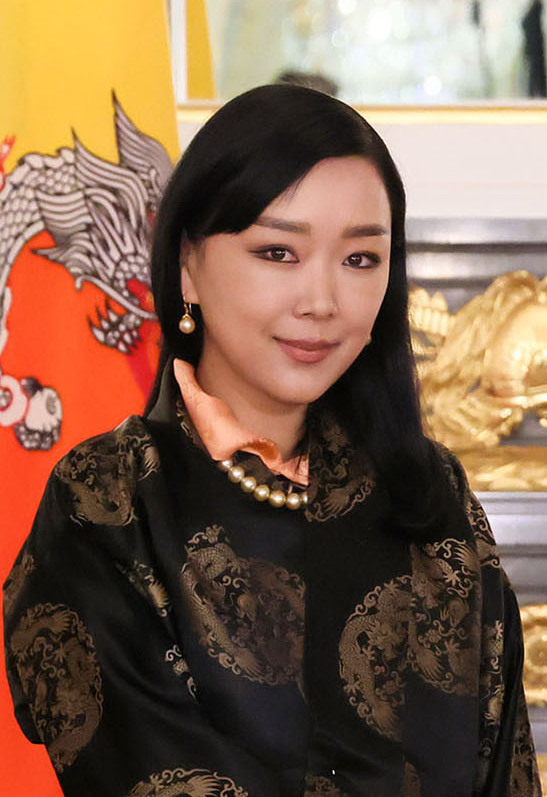
- Sonam Dechen in 2022
- Born: 5 August 1981 (age 44)
- Spouse: Phub W. Dorji (m. 2009)
- Issue: Jigje Singye Wangchuck; Vairochana Rinpoche Ngawang Jigme Jigten Wangchuck
- House: Wangchuck
- Father: Jigme Singye Wangchuck
- Mother: Dorji Wangmo
- Religion: Buddhism

Princess Sonam Dechen Wangchuck (Dzongkha: བསོད་ནམས་བདེ་ཆེན་དབང་ཕྱུག, Wylie: bsod nams bde chen dbang phyug, born 5 August 1981) is a princess of Bhutan. She is the daughter of the Fourth King of Bhutan Jigme Singye Wangchuck and Queen Mother Dorji Wangmo Wangchuck. She is half-sister of the fifth King, Jigme Khesar Namgyel Wangchuck.

== Biography ==
She was educated at Lungtenzampa Middle Secondary School and Yangchenphug Higher Secondary School, Choate Rosemary Hall, Wallingford, Connecticut, US.

She has a degree in international relations from Stanford University (1999) and a Masters in law from Harvard Law School (2007). She also clerked for the Royal High Court of Bhutan, later working at the Judiciary of the Kingdom of Bhutan as President of the Bhutan National Legal Institute (BNLI).

Sonam is a Bhutanese name denoting merit, longevity and good fortune.

== Marriage and children ==
She married a distant relative, Phub W. Dorji (born on 1 January 1980) at the Motithang Palace on 5 April 2009. He is a son of Zepon Wangchuck, a former monk, Chief Architect and project manager, from Takchu Gompa, Haa, by his wife, Ugyen Dolma, from Gaselo. Phub W. Dorji has degrees from US universities, later working in the Finance Ministry.

They have two sons:

- Jigje Singye Wangchuck (born on 3 December 2009).
- Vairochana Rinpoche Ngawang Jigme Jigten Wangchuck, Vairochana Rinpoche (born on 23 June 2013). Recognized by the 70th Je Khenpo, Jigme Choedra, as the reincarnation of the Great Lotsawa (The Translator) Vairotsana.

== Patronages ==
- Board Member of the Tarayana Foundation (TF).
- Honourable President of the Jigme Singye Wangchuck School of Law (JSW Law) since 2010.

== Official visits ==
- 24 October 2017 – Japan.
- 3 October 2022 – Japan.

== Foreign honours ==
- Tonga:
  - Knight Grand Cross of the Royal Order of the Crown of Tonga

== See also ==
- House of Wangchuck
- Line of succession to the Bhutanese throne

Sonam Dechen Wangchuck House of Wangchuck Born: 5 August 1981
Bhutanese royalty
Preceded by Jamyang Singye Wangchuck	Line of succession to the Bhutanese throne 12th position	Succeeded by Jigje Singye Wangchuck
