= Kesang Choden Wangchuck =

Bhutanese princess (born 1982)

Princess Ashi Kesang Choden Wangchuck
- Born: 23 January 1982 (age 44); Thimphu, Bhutan
- Spouse: Dasho Palden Yoser Thinley (m. 2008)
- Issue: Dasho Jamgyal Singye Wangchuck; Dasho Ugyen Junay Wangchuck; Ashi Tshering Tshoyang Wangchuck
- House: Wangchuck
- Father: Jigme Singye Wangchuck
- Mother: Tshering Pem
- Religion: Buddhism

Princess Ashi Kesang Choden Wangchuck (Dzongkha: སྐལ་བཟང་ཆོས་ལྡན་དབང་ཕྱུག, Wylie: skal bzang chos ldan dbang phyug, born 23 January 1982), is a member of the royal family of Bhutan. She is a daughter of the fourth King of Bhutan Jigme Singye Wangchuck and Queen Mother Ashi Tshering Pem Wangchuck, one of the former king's four wives, all of whom are sisters and held the title 'queen consort'. She is a half-sister of the current Druk Gyalpo (Dragon King) Jigme Khesar Namgyel Wangchuck, who became king following the abdication of his father Jigme Singye Wangchuck on 9 December 2006.

== Biography ==
HRH Ashi Kesang Choden Wangchuck attended Lungtenzampa Middle Secondary School and Yangchenphug High School in Thimphu and later attended Dana Hall in Massachusetts, United States. Her Royal Highness graduated from Stanford University.

HRH married Dasho Palden Yoser Thinley at the Dechencholing Palace on November 11, 2008, on a day coinciding with the 13th day of the ninth Bhutanese month. A graduate of Mahidol University, Thinley is a son of Dasho Jigme Yoser Thinley, the former Prime Minister of Bhutan, by his wife, Aum Rinsy Dem (died on 28 November 2018). The ceremony, organized by Je Khenpo was attended by the former king, the fourth Druk Gyalpo, the Royal Grandmother, Queen mothers and other members of the royal family, cabinet ministers and senior military officials. She is not to be confused with the other Ashi Kesang, one who is the Royal Grandmother of Bhutan and the other, the daughter of the younger sister of the Fourth King of Bhutan. They have three children:

- Dasho Jamgyal Singye Wangchuck.
- Dasho Ugyen Junay Wangchuck.
- Ashi Tshering Tshoyang Wangchuck (born in January 2019).

== Patronages ==
HRH Ashi Kesang Choden Wangchuck is the Royal Patron of the Gross National Happiness Center.

== See also ==
- House of Wangchuck
- Line of succession to the Bhutanese throne

Kesang Choden Wangchuck House of Wangchuck Born: 23 January 1982
Bhutanese royalty
Preceded by Dechen Yuidem Yangzom Wangchuck	Line of succession to the Bhutanese throne 19th position	Succeeded by Jamgyel Singye Wangchuck
