= Dechen Yangzom Wangchuck =

Bhutanese princess

Princess Ashi Dechen Yangzom Wangchuck
- Born: 2 December 1981 (age 44)
- Spouse: Dasho Tandin Namgyel (m. 2009)
- Issue: Ashi Dechen Yuidem Yangzom; Dasho Ugyen Dorji; Dasho Jigme SingyeAshi Dechen Yangsel Yangzom
- House: Wangchuck
- Father: Jigme Singye Wangchuck
- Mother: Tshering Yangdon
- Religion: Buddhism

Princess Ashi Dechen Yangzom Wangchuck (Dzongkha: བདེ་ཆེན་དབྱངས་འཛོམས་དབང་ཕྱུག, born 2 December 1981) is the daughter of the fourth King of Bhutan Jigme Singye Wangchuck and his wife, Queen Mother Ashi Tshering Yangdon Wangchuck. She is the sister of the fifth King, Jigme Khesar Namgyel Wangchuck.

== Royal duties ==
Princess Dechen Yangzom has travelled across the country in order to ensure the effective delivery of kidu to the most deserving sections of society.

== Family ==
She married Dasho Tandin Namgyel at the Dechencholing palace. He is the son of Dasho Kipchu Dorji (sometime Auditor General of the Kingdom of Bhutan), and his wife, Aum Chimi Wangmo.

They have two daughter and two sons:

- Ashi Dechen Yuidem Yangzom Wangchuck.
- Dasho Ugyen Dorji Wangchuck.
- Dasho Jigme Singye Wangchuck.

== See also ==
- Line of succession to the Bhutanese throne

Dechen Yangzom Wangchuck House of Wangchuck Born: 12 December 1981
Bhutanese royalty
Preceded by Jigme Jigten Wangchuck	Line of succession to the Bhutanese throne 15th position	Succeeded by Ugyen Dorji Wangchuck
