= Jigme Dorji Wangchuck (born 1986) =

Prince Gyaltshab Jigme Dorji Wangchuck
- Gyaltshab of Bhutan
- Born: 12 April 1986 (age 40)
- Spouse: Yeatso Lhamo (m. 2013)
- Issue: Ashi Decho Pema Wangchuck; Ashi N. Wangchuck; Dasho N. Wanchuck
- House: Wangchuck
- Father: Jigme Singye Wangchuck
- Mother: Tshering Yangdon
- Religion: Buddhism

Prince Gyaltshab Jigme Dorji Wangchuck (Dzongkha: འཇིགས་མེད་རྡོ་རྗེ་དབང་ཕྱུག་མཆོག, born 12 April 1986) is the third eldest Prince of Bhutan. His brother Jigme Khesar Namgyel Wangchuck became the king following the abdication of his father on 14 December 2006.

Prince Jigme Dorji is the fourth son of the fourth King of Bhutan Jigme Singye Wangchuck from Queen Mother Ashi Tshering Yangdon Wangchuck. His family includes an older brother, and an older sister, Princess Ashi Dechen Yangzom Wangchuck, as well as three half-brothers and four half-sisters.

== Education ==
In February 2009, he is said to be studying in Menlo College.

== Royal duties ==
Prince Jigme Dorji Wangchuck was appointed The Gyaltshab (རྒྱལ་ཚབ, King's Representative / Regent) for the six eastern districts of Bhutan in 2014. As Gyaltshab, he is the head of The Office of The Gyaltshab based in Gyalpozhing, Mongar, and administer's His Majesty's kidu to the people.

Eastern districts of Bhutan are: Lhuntse, Mongar, Pemagatshel, Samdrup Jongkhar, Trashigang and Trashiyangtse.

== Marriage ==
Prince Jigme Dorji wed Yeatso Lhamo on 17 October 2013 at the Domkhar Dzong (the Summer Palace) in Chumey, Bumthang, the maternal home of the bride.

Ashi Yeatso Lhamo Wangchuck is the daughter of Yab Dhondup Gyaltshen and Yum Sonam Choki, and she is also the elder sister of Her Majesty Queen Ashi Jetsun Pema Wangchuck, the Druk Gyaltsuen.

They have two daughters and one son:

- Ashi Decho Pema Wangchuck (born in 2014 in Gyalpozhing, Mongar).
- Ashi N. Wangchuck.
- Dasho N. Wangchuck.

== See also ==
- House of Wangchuck
- Line of succession to the Bhutanese throne

== Notes ==
Jigme Dorji Wangchuck (born 1986) House of Wangchuck Born: 14 April 1986
Bhutanese royalty
Preceded by Khamsum Singye Wangchuck	Line of succession to the Bhutanese throne 6th position	Succeeded by Decho Pema Wangchuk
