= Khendum Choden =

American poet

Khendum Choden is a poet, author, and the first Bhutanese Ph.D. graduate of the University of Texas at El Paso (UTEP). She is the daughter of a diplomat from the Kingdom of Bhutan and has also lived in Bangladesh, India and the United States. She was educated at Yangchenphug Higher Secondary School, then in Humanities High School in New York, USA, graduating in 2001. She started a course in Business Management and Economics in Stony Brook University, graduating in 2005, and has a doctoral degree in International Business/ Information Systems from UTEP. She was awarded the UTEP Dodson Fellowship and the Marcus Jonathan Hunt Graduate Fellowship.

She founded the Bhutanese Students Association at UTEP and served as the President of the Association at the University of Texas at El Paso, donating money to the victims of an earthquake that hit Bhutan in 2009.

== Publications ==
- Bagchi, Kallol, Purnendu Mandal, and Khendum Choden. "Trust or Cultural Distance—Which Has More Influence in Global Information and Communication Technology (ICT) Adoption?." Proceedings of the International Conference on Managing the Asian Century. Springer Singapore, (2013).
- Choden, Khendum. "Three essays employing cultural value theories to explain individual and national differences in ICT use/adoption and media utilization among multiple nations." (2013).
- Choden, Khendum, et al. "Do Schwartz’s Value Types Matter in Internet Use of Individual Developing and Developed Nations?." (2010).
- Choden, K., Mahmood, M. A., Mukhopadhyay, S., Luciano, E. (2009). Organizational Preparedness for Information Security Breaches: An Empirical Investigation. Decision Sciences Institute Conference proceedings
