= Jigme Singye Wangchuck =

King of Bhutan from 1972 to 2006

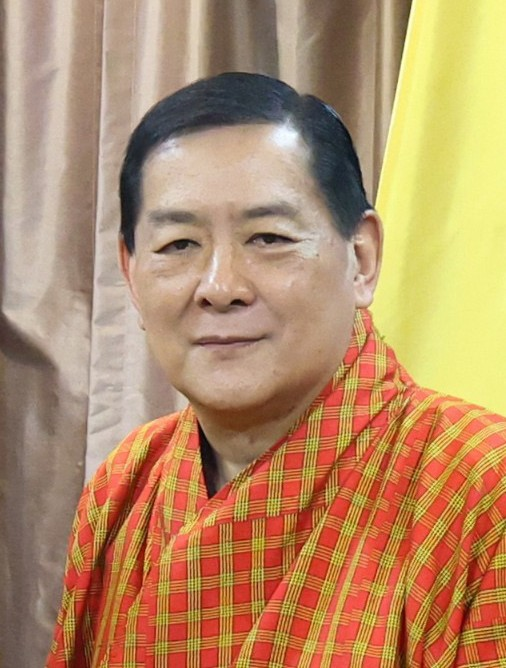
- Jigme Singye Wangchuck in 2025

King of Bhutan
- Reign: 24 July 1972 – 9 December 2006
- Coronation: 2 June 1974
- Predecessor: Jigme Dorji Wangchuck
- Successor: Jigme Khesar Namgyel Wangchuck
- Born: 11 November 1955 (age 71); Dechencholing Palace, Thimphu, Bhutan
- Spouse: 1st consort: Dorji Wangmo; 2nd consort: Tshering Pem; 3rd consort: Tshering Yangdon; 4th consort: Sangay Choden
- Issue: Chimi Yangzom Wangchuck; Jigme Khesar Namgyel Wangchuck; Sonam Dechen Wangchuck; Dechen Yangzom Wangchuck; Kesang Choden Wangchuck; Jigyel Ugyen Wangchuck; Khamsum Singye Wangchuck; Jigme Dorji Wangchuck; Euphelma Choden Wangchuck; Ugyen Jigme Wangchuck
- House: Wangchuck
- Father: Jigme Dorji Wangchuck
- Mother: Kesang Choden
- Religion: Tibetan Buddhism

Jigme Singye Wangchuck (Dzongkha: འཇིགས་མེད་སེང་གེ་དབང་ཕྱུག་, Wylie: jigs med seng ge dbang phyug; born 11 November 1955) is a member of the Wangchuck dynasty who reigned as King of Bhutan from 1972 until his abdication in 2006. He is the father of the present King Jigme Khesar Namgyel Wangchuck. He is the only son of five children born to the King Jigme Dorji Wangchuck and Queen Ashi Kesang Choden.

Jigme Singye Wangchuck studied at St. Joseph's School, Darjeeling, in India. In January 1965, he attended Summerfields prep school in St. Leonards-on-Sea, Sussex, England, and then Heatherdown School in 1966 where he completed his studies in 1969. After completion of his studies in 1970, he was appointed as the chairman of the National Planning Commission in the year 1971 by King Jigme Dorji Wangchuck. At the age of 16, he was appointed as the Trongsa Penlop and bestowed with saffron scarf.

On 21 July 1972, King Jigme Dorji died in Kenya, and the 16-year-old Crown Prince Jigme Singye Wangchuck ascended the throne, becoming the world's youngest monarch at the time. Just three days after his father's death, the Crown Prince assumed leadership of the government and the nation. His coronation ceremony was later held on June 2, 1974, in Thimphu.

During his reign, Bhutan transitioned from an absolute monarchy to a democratic constitutional monarchy. This progress towards a democratic constitutional monarchy started with decentralization of power to people on the grass root level. He initiated Dzongkhag Yargye Tshogdu (DYT) in 1981 and the Gewog Yargye Tshogchung (GYT) in 1991 in order to ensure people's participation and local governance. In 2001, a Constitution Drafting Committee was established under royal decree. The King personally presented the Constitution of Bhutan to citizens across all 20 Dzongkhags, with every word considered meaningful and sanctified by the people. It was introduced as "the People's Constitution," symbolizing its alignment with the aspirations of the Bhutanese people. The Constitution of Bhutan was enacted July 18, 2008 by the Royal Government.

He introduced the Gross National Happiness (GNH) philosophy in the early 1970s, emphasizing holistic development over purely economic growth. In 2003, he personally led Operation All Clear, a military campaign to expel insurgent groups from southern Bhutan, marking an unusual instance of a head of state leading troops into action. After 34 years of rule, he voluntarily abdicated in 2006 at 51 years old, overseeing a peaceful transition to democracy through a transparent constitutional process.

Throughout his reign, Jigme Singye Wangchuck implemented various socio-economic policies to enhance the quality of life in Bhutan. He emphasized the need to develop industry, agriculture, hydroelectricity, and infrastructural projects while prioritizing environmental and cultural preservation. The success of these policies can be seen in indicators such as increased access to education and healthcare, improvements in infrastructure, and the promotion of Bhutan's unique cultural heritage.

He was also responsible for the development of new policies in the environment and improved access to education and healthcare.

== Early life ==
Jigme Singye Wangchuck was born in Dechencholing Palace in Thimphu, Bhutan, on 11 November 1955 to Jigme Dorji Wangchuck and Ashi Kesang Choden Wangchuck. The political officer of India stationed in Sikkim, along with a representative of the Sikkimese government came to offer felicitations to the royal parents. At the age of four, sometime in 1959, the young Crown Prince made his first public appearance in Tashichho Dzong.

== Education ==
Jigme Singye Wangchuck began his education when he was six years old, in 1961, receiving a blend of both Buddhist and secular curricula at Dechencholing Palace. His formal education started with traditional teaching and was followed by the study of English and modern subjects, taught by trained teachers at the palace. The school at Dechencholing began with 45 students. Soon afterward, he went to study at St. Joseph's School, Darjeeling, in India. In January 1965, he attended Summerfields, a prep school in St. Leonards-on-Sea, Sussex, England, and then Heatherdown School in 1966 where he completed his studies in 1969. The next phase of his formal education took place at Namselling Palace in 1969. Finally, he attended Ugyen Wangchuck Academy at Satsham Choten in Paro, which was established in 1970, along with a class of selected students from all over Bhutan.

== Crown Prince ==
In 1971, the third King of Bhutan appointed Wangchuck as the chairman of the National Planning Commission, charged with the planning and coordination of the five-year development plan. The following year, on 16 June 1972, he was made the Trongsa Penlop, a role that including him receiving the saffron scarf or namza. During the 3rd Five-Year Plan (FYP), which spanned 1971–77, his father died. He was 16 at that time. 1972 to 1976 was the period of the 3rd FYP, and 1976 to 1981 was the period of the 4th FYP. As both King and the chairman of the National Planning Commission, the clearing house for the programs and projects, Wangchuck guided the planned activities first in broad terms and then increasingly in detail.

== Coronation ==
The coronation of Jigme Singye Wangchuck as the Fourth King of Bhutan was conducted in three distinct ceremonies, as in Bhutanese tradition. The inner coronation took place at Punakha Dzong in 1972 and involved religious rituals led by Je Khenpo Yonten Thaye, while the secret coronation in 1974 at Tashichhodzong took place at a moment considered auspicious in the traditional calendar and included Buddhist masters. The outer coronation on 2 June 1974 was a public event attended by international representatives. The Presidents of India and Bangladesh were the guests of honor. The Chogyal of Sikkim and the Prince of Nepal were among the attendees.

=== Royal wedding ===
Jigme Singye Wangchuck married four sisters in a Dechog Lhakhang in Punakha Dzong on 31 October 1988, a date corresponding with the Buddhist holiday of Lhabab Duchen, or Descending Day of Buddha. The four queens, Dorji Wangmo Wangchuck, Tshering Pem Wangchuck, Tshering Yangdon Wangchuck and Sangay Choden Wangchuck are daughters of Dasho Yab Ugyen Dorji, the descendant of both the mind and speech incarnations of Ngawang Namgyal, and Yum Thuiji Zam. Previously, they had married privately in 1979.

== Socio-economic development ==
The socio-economic development of Bhutan under King Jigme Singye Wangchuck was characterized by significant advancements across various sectors, including Gross National Happiness (GNH) as a guiding principle.

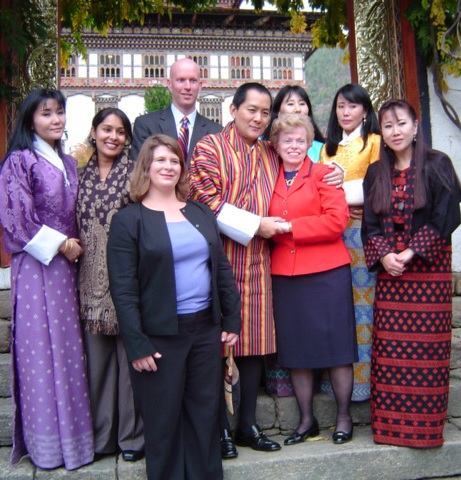
Jigme Singye Wangchuck in 2007 with Ellen Sauerbrey.

=== 1. Introduction of Gross National Happiness (GNH) ===
Jigme Singye Wangchuck believed that true progress for the Bhutanese people should be assessed through their happiness and overall quality of life. This belief is deeply rooted in Bhutan's ancient legal code from 1629, which stated that "if the government cannot create happiness for its people, then there is no purpose for the government to exist." This code, written by a Buddhist teacher, emphasized that laws must promote happiness for all sentient beings, a principle found in the Buddhist teachings. A 1986 royal decree instructed the Planning Commission to evaluate the nation's progress based on the happiness and comfort of its people under the auspices the 6th Five Year Plan. GNH is structured to include measurements of well-being rather than purely economic indicators. its four pillars are : 1. Sustainable and equitable socioeconomic development; 2. Conservation of the Environment; 3. Preservation and Promotion of Culture; and 4. Good Governance.

In 2008, Bhutan's Constitution enshrined GNH values in Article 9, which mandates the state to promote conditions conducive to pursuing happiness.

Today, GNH is defined as a "multidimensional development approach seeking to achieve a harmonious balance between material well-being and the spiritual, emotional, and cultural needs of society," emphasizing the need to balance physical and mental well-being.

=== 2. Improvements in healthcare ===
1. Expansion of healthcare infrastructure

- Increased facilities: The number of healthcare facilities grew substantially, from just 56 in 1974 to 715 by 2006. This included the establishment of hospitals and basic health units across the country.

- Accessibility: The expansion of the healthcare network provided increased access to medical services, especially in rural areas.

2. Improvement in health outcomes

- Life expectancy: Life expectancy increased from around 40 years in the early 1970s to 66 years by 2006.

- Infant and maternal mortality Rates: Infant mortality dropped significantly from 142 per 1,000 live births in 1985 to 60 in 2006. Maternal mortality also decreased from 7.7% to 2.6% during this period, associated with improved access to prenatal and postnatal care.

3. Universal health coverage

- Free primary health care: By the end of King Jigme Singye's reign, Bhutan achieved nearly universal coverage for primary healthcare services, with a focus on providing free medical care to all citizens.

4. Focus on preventive care

- Public health campaigns: The government launched vaccination programs that contributed to a significant reduction in communicable diseases.

- Access to clean water and nutrition: Efforts were made to improve access to safe drinking water and nutrition.

5. Human resource development

- Training programs: The establishment of institutions like the Royal Institute of Health Sciences in 1976 helped train healthcare professionals to address the shortage of qualified personnel.

- Increased workforce: By 2006, there was an increase in the number of health workers per capita compared to before 1976, enhancing service delivery.

=== 3. Education expansion ===
Bhutan experienced substantial transformations during this period, with advancements in the education sector. This shift was part of broader initiatives focused on national development and enhancing public welfare.

In 1974, when Jigme Singye Wangchuck ascended to the throne, only 14,000 pupils were enrolled in school. There were no degree-granting colleges at all. A cornerstone of Jigme Singye Wangchuck's educational policy was to significantly expand access to learning opportunities across the kingdom. The following steps were taken:

Schools were constructed in isolated regions. Overall, the number of educational institutions expanded from 97 in 1974 to 322 in 1998.

Bhutan currently has 243 primary and community schools, 44 junior high schools, 18 high schools and a range of other institutions that provide secondary and tertiary education; technical, managerial and vocational training.

Prioritizing quality and relevance: Jigme Singye Wangchuck further promoted efforts to improve the quality and relevance of education. He did so in the following ways:

Establishing teacher training institutions: The Royal Bhutan Polytechnic and the National Institute of Education were key training centers. It included 2 technical schools, 1 rigney (an educational institution with a focus on Buddhist studies and Bhutanese culture) school, 1 fine arts center, 1 school of Buddhist studies, and a teacher training institute".

Curriculum reform: Schools included lessons that taught about the different populations and regions of the country.

Student overseas opportunities: Thousands of government issued scholarships were provided to Bhutanese for study abroad to benefit their training or pursue education.

=== 4. Infrastructure development ===
In the early 1970s, Bhutan was a largely isolated, agrarian society with limited infrastructure. Key priorities under Jigme Singye Wangchuck's leadership included building essential services and infrastructure to alleviate societal challenges.

Early industrial development:

Early on, efforts were made to foster domestic industries. By 1973, an industrial estate in Phuntsholing was under construction, and provide entrepreneurs with work sheds equipped with necessary amenities. Loans were provided to industrialists to establish enterprises contributing to the national economy. Gelephu in southern Bhutan was emerging as an industrial center. These included furniture production, sawmills, as well as a match factory with the objective of supplying matches to the entire country.

Key themes and approaches:

Several key themes emerge from Wangchuck's approach to infrastructure development, as evident in his own words, stressing the importance of self-reliance. "It is imperative that the people and the government unite and work hand in hand in developing and building a better future for our country”. "From year to year, Bhutan is receiving increasing financial and technical assistance from many countries ... However, the most important task before us at present is to achieve economic self-reliance to ensure the continued progress of our country in the future.

Economic empowerment in rural development.

He stressed agriculture as the core of Bhutan's identity in order to promote a balanced society

Diversification of the economy: Priority was given to high-yield agriculture and providing access to credit to increase production. In addition, there was an emphasis on industry, hydroelectricity, and other infrastructure to improve peoples’ standard of living. To increase labour productivity among the farmers, imported farm machinery was procured at subsidized prices and distributed to the people along with improved farming tools.

=== 5. Tourism and Hydropower development ===
Jigme Singye Wangchuck's reign was marked by significant growth in tourism and hydropower development. Development was aimed at remote areas where it could improve the life of the people. According to his address to the people of Mongar in 1980, the Royal Government was emphasizing “...to remain as a sovereign independent country and achieve economic self-reliance, prosperity, peace and happiness for our people." and the way to achieve that was through Tourism and Hydropower development.

Hydropower development

Strategic importance:

Hydropower became a cornerstone of Bhutan's economic development, serving both domestic needs and as a major export earner. According to Wangchucks words, “...to achieve economic self-reliance..." the development of industries including hydropower is necessary.

Early initiatives:

The Chukha Hydel Project, commissioned in 1987, was an early hydropower effort. It became a significant source of revenue, primarily through exports to India.

Later projects:

Jigme Singye Wangchuck highlighted that the total expected revenue from Paro during the 5th FYP was Nu. 30.000 million as compared to the total revenue of Nu. 2.742 million in the Fourth Plan" indicating ongoing emphasis on revenue generation. The Kurichu Power Project, bourne from a 1994 agreement with India, was started (2001).

Tourism development

Controlled approach:

Bhutan opened to tourism in the 1970s, before which time the country remained largely isolated. Limited numbers of foreign dignitaries were permitted to enter Bhutan for the first time for the Fourth King's coronation celebrations. During Jigme Singye Wangchuck's reign, Bhutan adopted a "high-value, low-impact" tourism policy. This policy, rooted in GNH philosophy, prioritized cultural preservation and environmental protection over maximizing tourist numbers.

Aviation and accessibility:

To facilitate tourism, Druk Air launched aviation services in 1983. Druk Air, initially using Dornier aircraft, later upgraded to BAe jet planes with routes to major cities in South and Southeast Asia. Economic Contribution: Jigme Singye Wangchuck's policy included that tourism revenues would be used in development projects.

Speeches and principles

In his address to the National Assembly on September 10, 1972, shortly after his ascension to the throne, Jigme Singye Wnagchuck spoke about the wisdom of his late father, Jigme Dorji Wangchuck, and stated that it would be best to continue in line with the policies laid down by his father, at least initially. Jigme Singye Wangchuck wanted “a sustainable balance among economic, social, emotional and cultural needs of the people.” His hydropower development policy aimed for economic self-reliance without sacrificing social and cultural values. In an address at the 1978 National Day celebration, he emphasized "...Government and people must work together." In an address to the 54th session of the National Assembly on June 23, 1981, he stated " “We cannot depend forever on the generosity of our friends. Nor can we progress by depending on others. No country has advanced by allowing another country to do all its development work", He repeatedly pointed out. He went on to emphasize, "We must have the capacity to begin and complete any project we undertake.”

== Cultural preservation ==
Modernization can pose challenges to both culture and the environment. However, under Wangchuck's reign, efforts were made to mitigate this pressure by emphasizing the role of cultural preservation in maintaining national identity and stability. Wangchuck emphasized the distinctive characters of Bhutanese cultures. Wangchuck stated that it is the "distinct identity of our county", and not the nation's "wealth, weapons and armed forces", that is the vital instrument in securing the sovereignty of the nation.

As an example of Wangchuck's support of classical Bhutanese culture, he supported the construction of Tango Shedra. Tango Shedra enabled high-level study of the classical system of Bhuddhist cultural sciences. Academic monks complete their long studies with bachelor's and master's degrees in Tango. In 2008, 163 candidates – with 14 master's degrees and 149 bachelor's degrees –from Tango Shedra and Sangngag Chokhor Shedra in Paro held their graduation ceremonies at Tango.

Wangchuck established the Zorig Chusum, formerly Kawajangsa Institution of Zorig (now known as the National Institute for Zorig Chusum) in 1971 was established. At first, the institute concentrated on traditional fine arts. A similar institution was opened in 1997 in Tashi Yangtse. The Folk Heritage Museum started by Ashi Dorji Wangmo Wangchuck in Kawajangsa, Thimphu in 2001, drew attention to the heritage of lay people's sustainable products and their lifestyle. Likewise, in 2001, the first Textile Museum opened by Ashi Sangay Choden Wangchuck drew attention to the weaving skills of Bhutan. Skilled artisans – painters, statue-makers, carpenters, and masons proliferated in Wangchuck's reign not only because of these new institutions but also by receiving on-the-job training in many new temples and dzongs constructed in the country.

Wangchuck raised the profile of indigenous medicine during his reign by making indigenous medicine available as a parallel health service through the Institute of Indigenous Medicine.

When his reign started in 1972, there were approximately 2,000 monks in state-supported monasteries. By 2006, the number of monks subsisting on state allowances had increased to over 6,000. In parallel to the increase in the number of monks and nuns, the monastic infrastructure that included tutors, lamas, temples, gomdeys (meditation centers), and Shedras (Buddhist colleges), increased in Wangchuck's reign. Many new official Dratshangs were established in district headquarters that previously didn't have monastic body, including Tsirang, Gaylegphug, Tashi Yangtse, Samtse, Pema Gatshel, Chukha, Bumthang and Zhemgang. Numerous affiliate monasteries to each dzongkhag rabdey were also opened throughout the country.

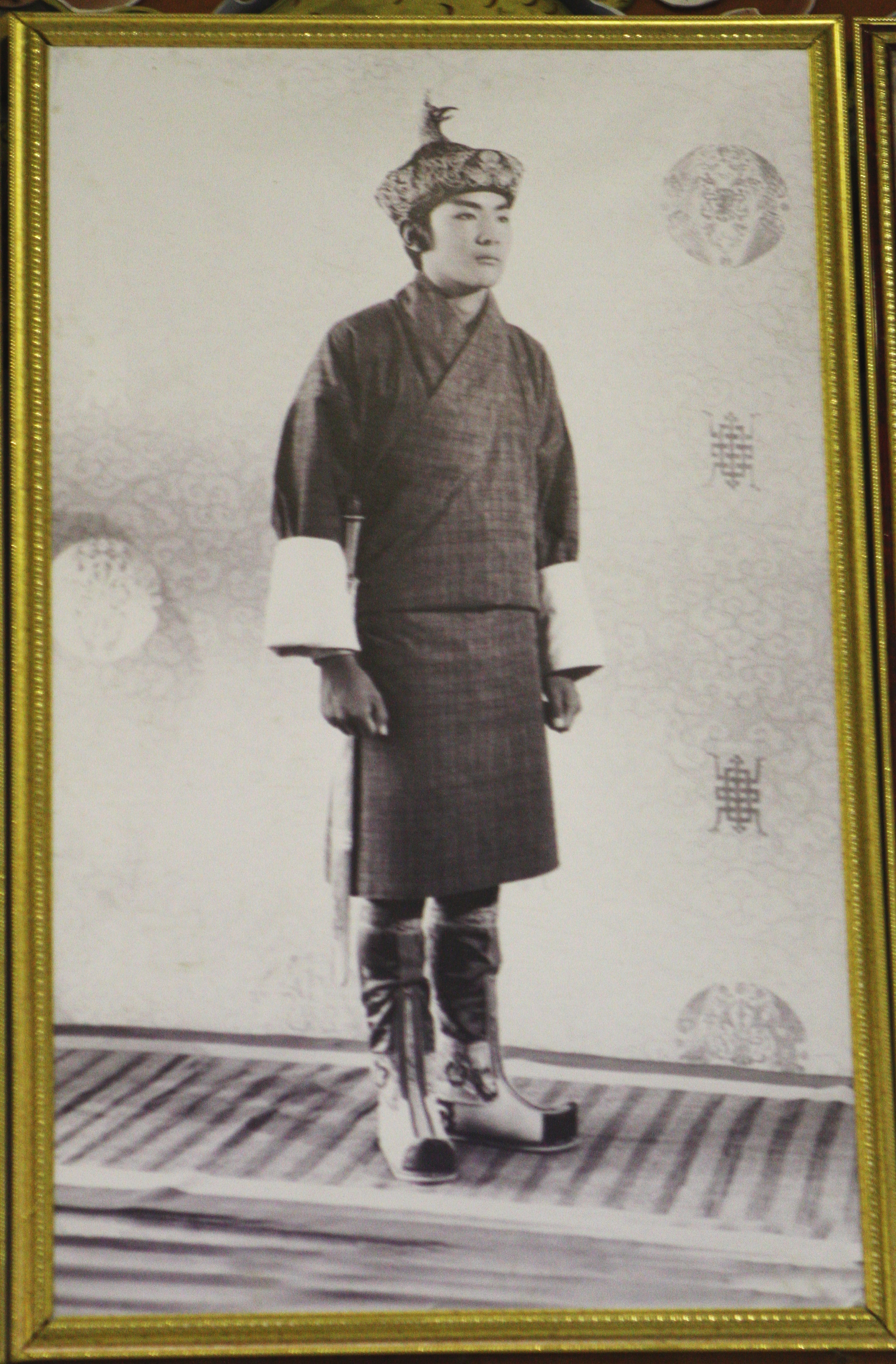
Picture of King Jigme Singye Wangchuck at Paro International Airport

By 2006, there were 13 Shedras located in Tango, Dodeydrag, Khothokha, Sanga Choekhor, Gontey, Tshangkha, Tharpaling, Nimalung, Talo Nalanda, Sewla, Ngatsang, Drametse, and Bartsham with a total enrolment of some 700 monks. There were over 24 drubdeys or meditation places, stretching from Singye dzong in the east to Tagchu Goenpa in Haa, enlisting 300 officially supported people who meditate on a long-term basis in 2006. These numbers were rolled as new meditation to succeed old ones upon their completion. There were over 45 monastic Lobdras, where teachers received official stipends and where gomchens (young lay priests) studied. By 2006, there were also 10 nunneries, started on an organized basis, located in Jashar Goenpa in Pema Gatshel in the east to Kila Goenpa in Paro in the west.

== Environmental conservation ==
Wangchuck also enhanced the protection of natural resources such as forests and biodiversity. Wangchuck foresaw the potentially adverse impacts of both increased economic activity and increased population on the fragility of the mountain ecosystem. He raised the importance of the preservation of the environment during policy discussions, which resulted in vast areas of the country being devoted to parks and sanctuaries.

=== Establishing parks and sanctuaries ===
- Jigme Dorji National Park, Khaling Wildlife Sanctuary and Phibsoo Wildlife Sanctuary declared in 1974
- Toorsa Nature Reserve, Jigme Singye Wangchuck National Park (known earlier as Jow Durshing National Park), Thrumsengla National Park, Sakteng Wildlife Sanctuary and Bomdeling Wildlife Sanctuary established in 1993. These efforts expanded Bhutan's network of parks and sanctuaries to safeguard its biodiversity.

=== International recognition ===
- Bhutan was identified as a global hotspot, in 1988
- UN Framework Convention on Climate Change and Convention on Biological Diversity signed in 1995
- Wangchuck and the people of Bhutan received the "Champions of the Earth" Award from UNEP, 2005
- In 2006, he was conferred the J. Paul Getty Conservation Leadership Award for his leadership in conservation. According to the World Wildlife Fund (WWF), this recognition highlighted his role in establishing policies and laws that positively impacted conservation in Bhutan and set an example globally. The award carried a cash prize of $200,000. Wangchuck stated that the award symbolized the collective efforts of the government and people of Bhutan.
- On February 13, 2011, Wangchuck was inducted into the Kyoto Earth Hall of Fame for his contributions to environmental conservation. Accepting the award in Kyoto, Her Royal Highness Princess Ashi Kezang Choden Wangchuck highlighted Bhutan's 72% forest cover and carbon-neutral pledge, dedicating the honor to the Bhutanese people and global environmental efforts.
- Wangchuck received the 2022 Blue Planet Prize from the Asahi Glass Foundation on October 5, 2022, in recognition of his Gross National Happiness (GNH) philosophy, which integrates environmental conservation as a core pillar. Her Royal Highness Princess Sonam Dechan Wangchuck accepted the award on his behalf, emphasizing that it was a tribute to Bhutan's collective commitment to ecological balance and sustainable development.

=== Policy development ===
- In 1985, Bhutan introduced Environmental Studies as part of its school curriculum. This initiative aimed to promote awareness and understanding of environmental issues among students. By integrating environmental education into the curriculum, the government sought to instill a sense of responsibility for the environment from an early age.
- National Environment Commission established in 1990. It was created as a central body to oversee environmental governance and policy implementation. Initially part of the Planning Commission, it later became an autonomous entity responsible for coordinating environmental activities, formulating policies, and ensuring that development projects are environmentally sustainable.
- Bhutan Trust Fund for Environment established in 1992. The Bhutan Trust Fund for Environmental Conservation was created as a financial mechanism to support conservation efforts. It was one of the first trust funds of its kind globally and has since provided funding for various projects aimed at protecting Bhutan's biodiversity and promoting sustainable resource management.
- Environment Assessment Act, 2000. It established a legal framework for assessing the environmental impacts of proposed development projects. The act mandates that all projects undergo an environmental assessment process to ensure that potential adverse effects on the environment are identified and mitigated before implementation.
- Bio-diversity Act of Bhutan, 2003. It was established to protect and regulate the use of the country's biological resources. The act aims to conserve Bhutan's biodiversity while ensuring that the use of biological resources is equitable and sustainable. It also provides guidelines for access to genetic resources and benefit-sharing mechanisms.

== Transition to democracy ==
Since 2008, Bhutan has been a democratic constitutional monarchy with the Druk Gyalpo as the head of the state and the existence of multiple political parties. This transition from absolute monarchy to democratic constitutional monarchy began in the reign of the Fourth Druk Gyalpo. Democratization started when Jigme Dorji Wangchuck, created a National Assembly in 1953.

A key aspect of his legacy was his role in advancing democracy in Bhutan. He believed that relying solely on a single individual for governance was a risk for a small, landlocked nation with a limited population. Jigme Singye Wangchuck played a significant role in advancing the process of democratization in Bhutan by decentralizing power from the central government to local authorities. In 1981, he established the Dzongkhag Yargye Tshogdu (Dzongkhag Development Committee) and later the Gewog Yargye Tshogchung (Block Development Committee) in 1991. These initiatives aimed to enhance public participation in decision-making and prepare citizens for democratic governance.

Key developments leading up to the democratic elections in 2008 included the dissolution of the Cabinet in 1998, which resulted in the election of a Council of Ministers endowed with full executive powers by representatives of the people. This was followed by the formation of a Constitution Drafting Committee in 2001 under royal command. The Constitution of Bhutan was presented to the citizens across the 20 Dzongkhags by the King, with each word being regarded as significant and blessed by the people of the nation. The constitution was presented as 'the People's Constitution' reflecting its intended alignment with the aspiration of Bhutanese citizens. During the ceremony, he expressed that this document symbolizes a pivotal moment in Bhutan's democratic journey, marking a commitment to uphold the rights and responsibilities enshrined within it. The event underscored the unique manner in which democracy was introduced in Bhutan, reflecting a collaborative effort between the monarchy and the citizens to establish a constitutional framework that would guide the nation's governance. These reforms reduced the monarchy's powers, transferring authority to elected officials and laying the foundation for Bhutan's transition to a constitutional monarchy.

The emergence of democracy in Bhutan is characterized by its divergence from traditional democratic transition theories, which typically involve a significant demand for democracy from a politically conscious citizens. Instead, Bhutan's democratic system was primarily initiated and driven by the monarchy. In 2006, when the Fourth King, announced his intention to abdicate and conduct parliamentary elections, many Bhutanese citizens expressed their emotional resistance to this change. They argued that the country was already experiencing political stability, peace, and economic progress under the monarchy. The Fourth King justified his decision by stating that democracy should be introduced during times of peace and that it was unwise to rely solely on one individual, especially considering the unknown capabilities of future heirs.

This rationale has led many Bhutanese to view their democracy as unique, often referred to as a “Gift from the Golden Throne.” Jigme Singye Wangchuck has articulated his vision for Bhutanese democracy on multiple occasions. In a speech during the National Assembly session in June 2007, he emphasized that the principles of democracy should permeate all aspects of life—at home, in communities, at work, and within government—indicating that democracy is not merely a political concept but a way of life grounded in individual values and integrity.

== Decentralisation ==
At the end of the 4th FYP (1976–1981), Wangchuck extensively reviewed the successes and challenges of the previous four years of development, which also included the physical inspection of the field projects. Wangchuck envisioned different planning system for the 5th FYP (1981–86) emphasising decentralisation. He initiated the creation of the Dzongkhag Yargye Tshogdu (DYT) in 1981 and the Gewog Yargye Tshogchung (GYT) in 1991. These bodies were designed to empower local leaders and facilitate community involvement in governance. The DYT serves as a district development committee, while the GYT operates at the village level. The DYT was a district-level council aimed at promoting people's participation in decision-making by formulating, approving, and implementing plans at the district levels whereas GYTs are block-level councils that further decentralized power to local communities. They involve elected representatives like gups and mangmis who oversee development activities within their respective gewogs. As part of the Fifth Five-Year Plan (1981–1986), new dzongdags (district heads) were appointed across all 18 districts. They were given broad responsibilities for managing public finances and coordinating district development plans, acting as chairpersons of the DYT. This delegation of authority allowed for more localized decision-making in conjunction with elected local leaders (gups and chimis) The King increasingly devolved authority to local governance structures, enabling them to make decisions that directly affected their communities. This shift aimed to bring governance closer to the people and improve responsiveness to local needs. In 1998, Wangchuck delegated the power of selecting ministers to the National Assembly, reinforcing democratic principles within the monarchy. He retained mechanisms such as the no-confidence vote, ensuring accountability among ministers. Various independent institutions were established during his reign, including subdistrict courts (Dungkhag courts), the Royal Civil Service Commission, and the Election Commission. These institutions laid the groundwork for a more structured governance framework. In 1992, Wangchuck granted autonomy to Bhutan's national newspaper, Kuensel, and the national radio network, Bhutan Broadcasting Service (BBS), which had previously been government-controlled. This move promoted greater transparency and freedom of expression. By empowering local bodies and promoting public involvement in decision-making, these reforms contributed to a gradual transition from a centralized monarchy to a constitutional democracy.

== Foreign policy ==
=== State visits ===
Bhutanese participation in international organizations at various levels increased. Personally, Wangchuck attended the non-aligned and SAARC summits until 1997, traveling to Colombo in 1976 for 8th Non-Aligned Summit; Havana in 1979 for 6th Non-Aligned Summit; New Delhi in 1983 for 5th SAARC Summit and 1995 for 8th SAARC Summit; Harare in 1986 for 8th Non-Aligned Summit; Kathmandu in 1987 for 3rd SAARC Summit; Islamabad in 1988 for 4th SAARC Summit; Belgrade in 1989 for 9th Non-Aligned Summit; Malé in 1990 for 5th SAARC Summit, and Dhaka in 1993 for 7th SAARC Summit.

=== Diplomatic expansion ===
Wangchuck emphasized a two-fold foreign policy for Bhutan: to deepen Bhutan's relations with India and to create new bonds of friendship with fellow members of the UN. To diversify the sources of funding, Bhutan cultivated close relationships with the UN, ever since the visit of a UN Under-Secretary-General in 1974. Bhutan became a member of the UN in 1971. Relationships with other nations widened rapidly after 1974. The Coronation of 1974 brought a large number of foreign delegates. As a member of the international comity of nations, the occasion was used to make a debut on the international stage. So, the representatives of the five permanent member countries of the Security Council based in Delhi were invited. Additionally, 19 heads of missions and representatives from international organizations and international press corps attended the coronation. Notably, a representative from China also attended. Bhutan supported China's seat in the United Nations in 1971 soon after Bhutan became a member of the UN. In parallel to the increase in development assistance, the decade between 1980 and 1990 was a period of enhanced diplomacy for Bhutan. In this decade, under the guidance of Wangchuck, Bhutan established diplomatic relations with 17 out of the existing 53 countries, and became associated with 12 out of 20 organizations of the United Nations family.

In Wangchuck's reign, diplomatic links were developed with many other nations such as Bangladesh in 1973; Kuwait in 1983; Nepal in 1983; The Maldives in 1984; Denmark in 1985; Norway in 1985; Sweden in 1985; Switzerland in 1985; Netherlands in 1985; Japan in 1986; Finland in 1986; South Korea in 1987; Sri Lanka in 1987; Austria in 1989; Thailand in 1991; Bahrain in 1992; Singapore in 2002; Australia in 2002 and Canada in 2003. Wangchuck cultivated bonds of friendship with other countries and strengthened Bhutan-international relationships and diversified its sources of development assistance.

== Operation All Clear ==
Operation All Clear, initiated on December 15, 2003, targeted several districts in southern Bhutan to remove the presence of two banned insurgent groups from Assam—ULFA and the National Democratic Front of Boroland (NDFB)—as well as the Kamtapur Liberation Organisation (KLO), which was active in North Bengal. These groups had set up more than 40 camps, both large and small, in the kingdom over a period starting in 1989.

To flush out the insurgents and restore its control over the area, the Royal Bhutan Army (RBA), personally led by Jigme Singye Wangchuck and his son Jigyel Ugyen Wangchuck, initiated military actions against the camps illegally built by militants in Samtse's, Kalikhola sub-district, Sarpang, Nganglam sub-district, Samdrup Jongkhar, Bhagtar sub-district and Daifam sub-district. The RBA operation aimed to destroy camps and seize weapons so that the militants could not re-establish themselves there in the future. Operation All Clear successfully cleared the bases over a period of two days (15–16 December) by combining guerrilla and conventional warfare tactics, which resulted in minimal casualties.

== Popularity abroad ==
In 1989, during the state funeral of Emperor Hirohito in Tokyo, Bhutan's fourth King, Jigme Singye Wangchuck, endured freezing temperatures in traditional Bhutanese attire and remaining until the ceremony's conclusion, earning the admiration of the Japanese people. His gesture created lasting goodwill between Bhutan and Japan, raising awareness about Bhutan and endearing him to the Japanese nation.

== Jubilee ==
The silver Jubilee of Jigme Singye Wangchuck was celebrated on 2 June 1999. This event provided an opportunity to reflect on the milestones achieved during his reign. The occasion was celebrated nationwide with cultural performances, traditional dances, and public gatherings. A commemorative medal was issued to mark the event.

Wangchuck introduced Gross National Happiness (GNH) as a framework that emphasizes holistic well-being alongside economic development. His leadership was marked by efforts to modernize Bhutan while also aiming to preserve its cultural identity and expand diplomatic relations with various countries, including Japan and Sweden. The Silver Jubilee celebration of his reign prompted discussions about Bhutan's history and culture, underscoring the significant developments that occurred during this period. This event is viewed as an important moment in Bhutan's history, reflecting the relationship between the monarchy and the populace while acknowledging the ongoing efforts to balance tradition with modernization.

== Abdication ==
Wangchuck abdicated the throne in favor of his son in 2006, in preparation for the country's transition from an absolute monarchy to a semi-constitutional monarchy. In doing so, he stated: "The best time to change a political system is when the country enjoys stability and peace... Why wait for a revolution? Why crown an heir only when the nation is in mourning for a late king?" Having ruled since 1972, Jigme Singye Wangchuck was known for his efforts to modernize Bhutan while preserving its cultural identity and promoting the concept of Gross National Happiness (GNH). His abdication marked a significant turning point in Bhutanese history, facilitating democratic reforms and a new era of governance in the country.

== Wives and children ==
1. Dorji Wangmo (born 10 June 1955, first wife)

Name	Birth	Marriage		Issue
Princess Ashi; Sonam Dechen Wangchuck (Photo)	5 August 1981 (age 45)	5 April 2009	Dasho Phub W. Dorji	Dasho Jigje Singye Wangchuck (3 December 2009) (age 16 years) Dasho Jigme Jigten Wangchuck (23 August 2013) (age 13 years)
Prince Dasho; Jigyel Ugyen Wangchuck (Photo)	6 July 1984 (age 42)			

2. Tshering Pem (born 22 December 1957, second wife)

Name	Birth	Marriage		Issue
Princess Ashi; Chimi Yangzom Wangchuck (Photo)	10 January 1980 (age 46)	13 October 2005	Dasho Sangay Wangchuck	Dasho Jigme Ugyen Wangchuck (ca. September 2006 (age 20)) Dasho Jamyang Singye Wangchuck (2009 (age 16–17))
Princess Ashi; Kesang Choden Wangchuck (Photo)	23 January 1982 (age 44)	11 November 2008	Dasho Palden Yoser Thinley	Dasho Jamgyel Singye Wangchuck Dasho Ugyen Junay Wangchuck Ashi Tshering Tshoyang Wangchuck (ca. January 2019 (age 7))
Prince Dasho; Ugyen Jigme Wangchuck (Photo)	11 November 1994 (age 32)			

3. Tshering Yangdon (born 21 June 1959, third wife)

Name	Birth	Marriage		Issue
King Druk Gyalpo; Jigme Khesar Namgyel Wangchuck	21 February 1980 (age 46)	13 October 2011	Ashi Jetsun Pema	Crown Prince Druk Gyalsey; Jigme Namgyel Wangchuck (5 February 2016) (age 10 years) Prince Dasho Jigme Ugyen Wangchuck (19 March 2020) (age 6 years) Princess Ashi Sonam Yangden Wangchuck (9 September 2023) (age 3 years)
Princess Ashi; Dechen Yangzom Wangchuck (Photo)	2 December 1981 (age 44)	29 October 2009	Dasho Tandin Namgyel	Ashi Dechen Yuidem Yangzom Wangchuck Dasho Ugyen Dorji Wangchuck Dasho Jigme Singye Wangchuck
Prince Gyaltshab; Jigme Dorji Wangchuck (Photo)	14 April 1986 (age 40)	17 October 2013	Ashi Yeatso Lhamo	Ashi Decho Pema Wangchuck (2014 (age 11–12))

4. Sangay Choden (born 11 May 1963, fourth wife)

Name	Birth	Marriage		Issue
Prince Dasho; Khamsum Singye Wangchuck (Photo)	6 October 1985 (age 41)			
Princess Ashi; Euphelma Choden Wangchuck (Photo)	6 June 1993 (age 33)	29 October 2020	Dasho Thinley Norbu	

== Styles ==
- 11 November 1955 – 15 May 1972: His Royal Highness Dasho (Prince) Jigme Singye Wangchuck
- 15 May 1972 – 15 July 1972: His Royal Highness Trongsa Penlop Dasho Jigme Singye Wangchuck, The Crown Prince of Bhutan
- 15 July 1972 – 14 December 2006: His Majesty King Jigme Singye, The Fourth Druk Gyalpo, The King of Bhutan
- 14 December 2006 – present: His Majesty King Jigme Singye, The Fourth Druk Gyalpo, The King Father of Bhutan

== Awards and recognition ==
- Japan :
  - Collar of the Supreme Order of the Chrysanthemum (16 March 1987).
- Nepal :
  - Member of the Order of Ojaswi Rajanya (5 October 1988).
- Kuwait :
  - Collar of the Order of Mubarak the Great (1990).
- Bahrain :
  - Order of Al Khalifa, 1st Class (1990).
- Sweden :
  - Knight of the Royal Order of the Seraphim (1994).
  - Champions of the Earth 2005:
  - WWF J Paul Getty Award 2006: Bhutan King Jigme Singye Wangchuck has been conferred the 2006 J Paul Getty Conservation Leadership Award in recognition of "his leadership and deep concern for the environment." Her Royal Highness Ashi Sonam Dechan Wangchuck accepted the 2006 J. Paul Getty Conservation Leadership Award on behalf of His Majesty the King and the people.
  - The 2006 TIME 100 2006: His Majesty the Fourth Druk Gyalpo of Bhutan was also recognized by the 2006 TIME 100 for "setting a quietly revolutionary precedent." His legacy of Gross National Happiness, the transition from Absolute Monarchy to Democratic Constitutional Monarchy, and the Drafting of the Constitution sets a moral example of transforming the world.
  - Kyoto Hall Of Fame 2011: In a ceremony attended by around 600 people, including Their Imperial Highnesses Prince Akishino-miya and Princess Kiko-Sama and prominent citizens of Japan, Her Royal Highness Princess Ashi Kezang Choden Wangchuck received the Hall of Fame award on behalf of the Fourth Druk Gyalpo on February 13. His Majesty, Jigme Singye Wangchuck the fourth King of Bhutan was recognised for his outstanding contribution to the protection of the global environment.
  - Blue Planet Prize 2022

== See also ==
- Druk Gyalpo
- Ngawang Namgyal
- Penlop of Trongsa
- Great Buddha Dordenma
- House of Wangchuck
- Gross National Happiness
- Tashichho Dzong

== External references ==
- Bhutan Times (2007). Immortal Lines: Speeches of the 4th Druk Gyalpo Jigme Singye Wangchuck. Thimphu: Bhutan Times.
- Kingdom of Bhutan (1999). 25 Years a King His Majesty King Jigme Singye Wangchuck 1974-1999. Royal Government of Bhutan.
- Lyonchhen Jigmi Yoeser Thinley (2009). State of the Nation Report 2009 (PDF) (Report). Cabinet Secretariat. p. 92. Archived from the original (PDF) on 23 July 2015.
- Lyonchhen Jigmi Yoeser Thinley (1 July 2010). The 2nd Annual Report of the Hon'ble Prime Minister to the Fifth session of the First Parliament on the State of the Nation (PDF) (Report). Cabinet Secretariat. p. 92. Archived from the original (PDF) on 23 July 2015.
- Lyonchhen Jigmi Yoeser Thinley (1 July 2011). Third Annual Report of Lyonchhen Jigmi Yoeser Thinley to the Seventh Session of the First Parliament on the State of the Nation (PDF) (Report). Cabinet Secretariat. p. 124. Archived from the original (PDF) on 23 July 2015.

Jigme Singye Wangchuck House of Wangchuck Born: 11 November 1955
Regnal titles
Preceded by Jigme Dorji Wangchuck	King of Bhutan; 1972–2006	Succeeded by Jigme Khesar Namgyel Wangchuck
Preceded by None	King Father of Bhutan; 2006–present	Succeeded by Incumbent
