= Kesang Choden (queen) =

Queen of Bhutan from 1952 to 1972

- The Royal Grandmother
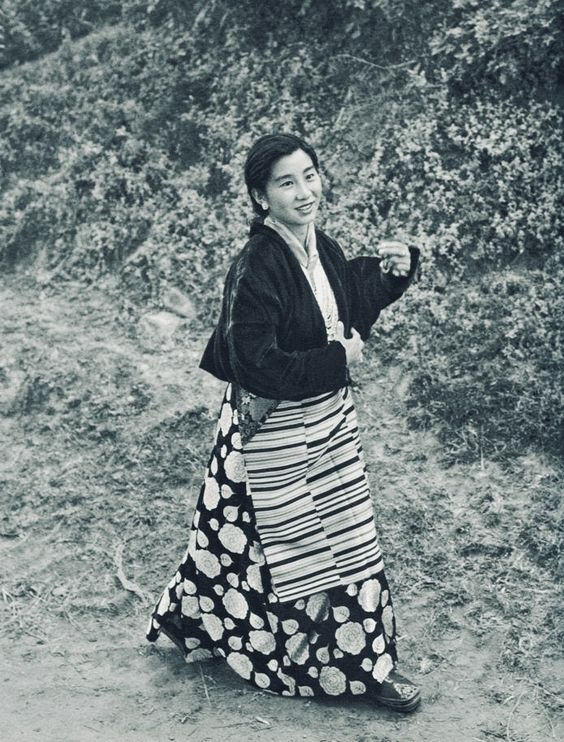
- Kesang Choden in 1950

Queen consort of Bhutan
- Tenure: 30 March 1952 – 21 July 1972
- Coronation: 27 October 1952
- Born: 21 May 1930 (age 96); Bhutan House, Kalimpong, India
- Spouse: Jigme Dorji Wangchuck (m. 1951; died 1972)
- Issue: Sonam Choden Wangchuck; Dechen Wangmo Wangchuck; Jigme Singye Wangchuck; Pema Lhaden Wangchuck; Kesang Wangmo Wangchuck
Names
- Kesang Choden Wangchuck (Note: Women in Bhutan retain their names upon marriage.)
- House: Dorji (by birth); Wangchuck (by marriage)
- Father: Gongzim Sonam Tobgye Dorji
- Mother: Mayeum Choying Wangmo Dorji
- Religion: Buddhism

Ashi Kesang Choden (Dzongkha: སྐལ་བཟང་ཆོས་ལྡན, Wylie: skal bzang chos ldan, born 21 May 1930) is the widow of King Jigme Dorji Wangchuck. She participates in royal duties of her own accord.

She is the only living Queen Grandmother in the World. In Bhutan she is called The Royal Grandmother.

== Education ==
She was educated at the St Joseph's Convent, Kalimpong, India, as well as the House of Citizenship, London.

In her reminiscence, the Queen notes:

The Irish nuns of St. Joseph’s Convent were very well educated and taught us well. The nuns were most kind and loving to me and I in turn loved and respected them greatly.

== Marriage and family ==
She married Crown Prince of Bhutan (Druk Gyalsey), Jigme Dorji Wangchuck, at the Ugyen Pelri Thang Palace, Paro, on 5 October 1951.

She became Queen consort of Bhutan in 1952 when her husband, King Jigme Dorji Wangchuck, ascended to the throne upon the death of his father. In 1953 she was expecting her first child, a daughter. Her first daughter arrived earlier than she expected as she was waiting for a Western doctor and her mother to travel to Thimphu to help with the delivery. The previous Queen, Ashi Phuntsho Choden, her maid, and the Bhutanese doctor Phenchun helped to deliver her daughter.

Her children with the Third Druk Gyalpo were:

- Princess (Druk Gyalsem) Sonam Choden Wangchuck (born 1953)
- Princess (Druk Gyalsem) Dechen Wangmo Wangchuck (born 1954)
- King (Druk Gyalpo) Jigme Singye Wangchuck (born 1955)
- Princess (Druk Gyalsem) Pema Lhaden Wangchuck (born 1959)
- Princess (Druk Gyalsem) Kesang Wangmo Wangchuck (born 1961)

== Royal duties ==
On 22 April 1972, she was appointed regent when her husband was ill. She has also been a patron of annual prayers conducted for the well-being and security of the King, country, and the people. She provides subsistence allowance to about 500 monks and tshampas (lay monks) in various monasteries in Bumthang, Dokar Phurdrub Gompa and Euto Gompa in Paro, Nyala Gompa in Trongsa and Jangsa Gompa in Kalimpong, India. She also has a keen interest in preserving the unique art, architecture and cultural heritage of Bhutan and in promoting research and scholarship on the kingdom. She often visits religious places in Bhutan and India.

In commemoration of the Royal Grandmother's 87th birth anniversary, a book titled "The Heart of a Sacred Kingdom, Her Majesty the Royal Grandmother Ashi Kesang Choden Wangchuck: A Lifetime of Service to the People and Kingdom of Bhutan" was published on Sunday 21 May 2017.

== Notes ==
Kesang Choden (queen) House of Wangchuck Born: 21 May 1930
Bhutanese royalty
Preceded by Phuntsho Choden; Pema Dechen	Queen consort of Bhutan; 1952–1972	Succeeded by Dorji Wangmo; Tshering Pem; Tshering Yangdon; Sangay Choden
Preceded by Phuntsho Choden; Pema Dechen	Queen Mother of Bhutan; 1972–2006	Succeeded by Dorji Wangmo; Tshering Pem; Tshering Yangdon; Sangay Choden
Preceded by Phuntsho Choden; Pema Dechen	Queen Grandmother of Bhutan; 2006–present	Incumbent
