= Dasho =

Bhutanese honorific

Dasho (Dzongkha: དྲག་ཤོས; Wylie: Drag-shos) (lit. Excellent One) is a Bhutanese honorific that is bestowed upon individuals, along with a red scarf kabney, by the Druk Gyalpo. In common practice, however, many senior government officials and social elites are addressed as Dasho without officially receiving the title and the red scarf kabney.

Although the title is bestowed upon both men and women, men are more likely to be addressed as Dasho without receiving the kabney. Dasho is also used for princes of the royal house, its female equivalent being Ashi.

== See also ==
- Ashi
- Rinpoche
