= Jigme Khesar Namgyel Wangchuck =

King of Bhutan since 2006

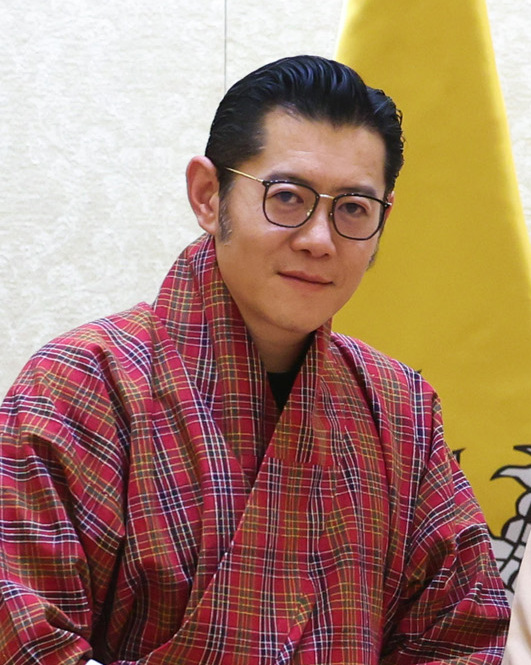
- Khesar in 2024

King of Bhutan
- Reign: 9 December 2006 – present
- Coronation: 6 November 2008
- Predecessor: Jigme Singye Wangchuck
- Heir apparent: Jigme Namgyel Wangchuck
- Born: 21 February 1980 (age 46); Kathmandu, Nepal
- Spouse: Jetsun Pema (m. 2011)
- Issue: Jigme Namgyel Wangchuck; Jigme Ugyen Wangchuck; Sonam Yangden Wangchuck
- Dynasty: Wangchuck
- Father: Jigme Singye Wangchuck
- Mother: Tshering Yangdon
- Religion: Drukpa Kagyu Buddhism
- Education: Wheaton College; Magdalen College (MPhil)

Jigme Khesar Namgyel Wangchuck (Note: US: /ˈdʒɪɡˌmiːkeɪˈsɜːrnɑːmˈɡɛl wɑːŋˈtʃuːk/; Dzongkha: འཇིགས་མེད་གེ་སར་རྣམ་རྒྱལ་དབང་ཕྱུག་, Wylie: jigs med ge sar rnam rgyal dbang phyug) (born 21 February 1980) is the current King of Bhutan, reigning since 9 December 2006. A member of the Wangchuck dynasty, he is the eldest son of King Jigme Singye Wangchuck, and his third wife, Queen Tshering Yangdon. He received his early education in Bhutan before studying abroad in the United States and the United Kingdom, ultimately graduating from Wheaton College with a degree in politics.

His father abdicated the throne on 14 December 2006 after 34 years of rule, making Jigme Khesar the world's youngest reigning monarch at the time, aged 26. His formal coronation ceremony took place on 6 November 2008, coinciding with the centenary of Bhutan's monarchy. Since ascending the throne, he has overseen Bhutan's transition to a constitutional monarchy, including the adoption of the Constitution of Bhutan in 2008 and the country’s first parliamentary elections. He is widely recognized for his commitment to Gross National Happiness, the guiding principle of Bhutanese governance, and has championed policies on environmental conservation, youth empowerment, and international diplomacy, particularly strengthening ties with India and China.

In recent years, Jigme Khesar has promoted sustainable development initiatives, including the 2023 launch of Gelephu Mindfulness City, an economic hub emphasizing mindfulness and green innovation, supporting growth while maintaining Bhutan's carbon-negative status. This effort earned him recognition on the Time 100 Climate list in 2024. He has further strengthened bilateral relations with India through high-level visits, including a December 2024 visit focused on energy partnerships and economic collaboration, and represented Bhutan at international events such as the coronation of King Charles III and Queen Camilla in 2023 and the funeral of former Indian prime minister Manmohan Singh in 2024. Domestically, he has promoted youth programs such as the Gyalsung National Service, whose first 2025 cohort completed training in June 2025, and has received honorary doctorates for contributions to creative and ethical development from Thammasat University in 2024 and Chiba Institute of Technology in 2025.

In 2011, he married Jetsun Pema, a commoner, in a traditional Buddhist ceremony. The couple has three children: Jigme Namgyel Wangchuck, Jigme Ugyen Wangchuck, and Sonam Yangden Wangchuck. As head of the Wangchuck dynasty, he continues the legacy of his predecessors, including his great-grandfather Ugyen Wangchuck, founder of modern Bhutan in 1907, and his grandfather Jigme Dorji Wangchuck, who initiated mid-20th-century modernization reforms.

== Early life and education ==
Jigme Khesar Namgyel Wangchuck was born on 21 February 1980 at Kathmandu (maternity Hospital). He is the eldest son of the fourth Druk Gyalpo of Bhutan, Jigme Singye Wangchuck, and his third wife, Queen Ashi Tshering Yangdon. He has a younger sister, Princess Ashi Dechen Yangzom, and brother, Prince Gyaltshab Jigme Dorji, as well as four half-sisters and three half-brothers.

After completing his higher secondary studies at Yangchenphug High School, he was educated in the United States at Phillips Academy in Andover and at Cushing Academy in Ashburnham, where he finished high school. He then studied at Wheaton College in Massachusetts before completing the Diplomatic Studies Programme and an MPhil in politics at Magdalen College, Oxford.

== Crown Prince ==
The Crown Prince, popularly known to the people of Bhutan as 'Dasho Khesar', accompanied his father on his many tours throughout the kingdom to meet and speak to the people. He also officially represented Bhutan on several international events. On 8 May 2002, he represented Bhutan at the 27th UN general assembly and made his first speech to the United Nations, addressing issues related to the welfare of millions of children around the world. He attended Thai King Bhumibol Adulyadej's 60th Anniversary Celebrations on 12–13 June 2006 in Bangkok along with royals from 25 countries.

On 25 June 2002 the Crown Prince was awarded the Red Scarf by his father.

== Trongsa Penlop ==
On 31 October 2004, Khesar was installed as the 16th Trongsa Penlop in Trongsa Dzong. The institution of the Trongsa Penlop, started by Zhabdrung Ngawang Namgyal in 1647, signifies the heritage to the Bhutanese Throne and the investiture ceremony of the Trongsa Penlop is the formal declaration of this status of the Crown Prince.

== Accession to the throne ==
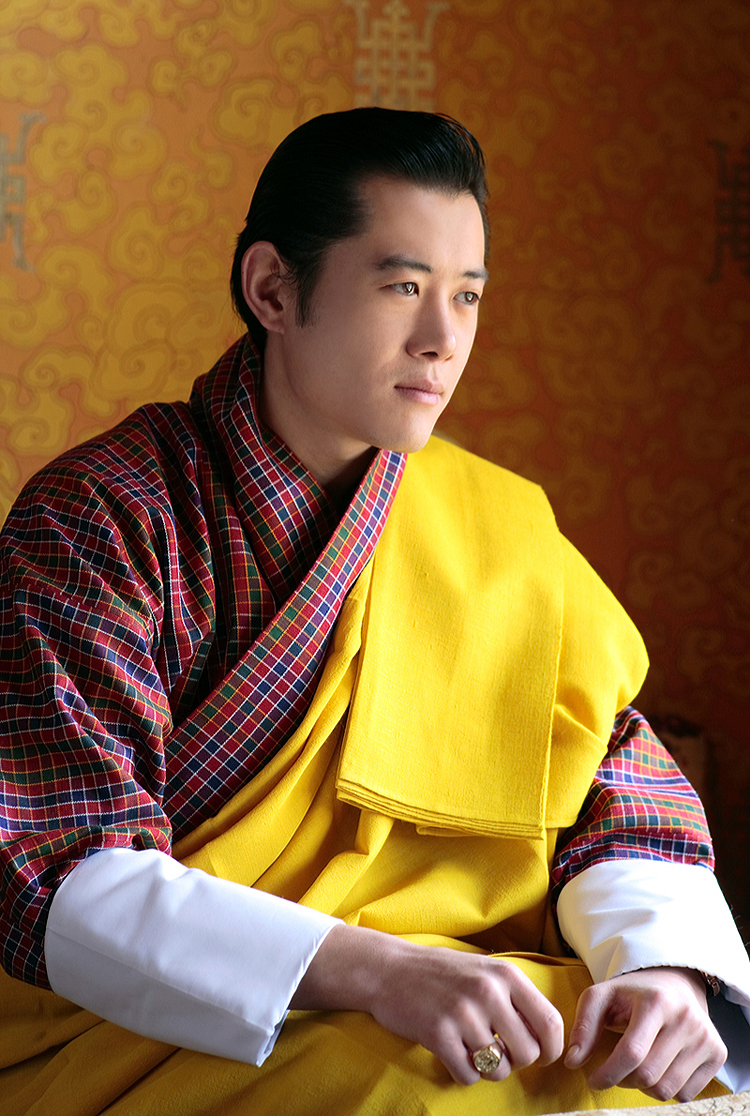
Official portrait of Jigme Khesar, 2007

In December 2005, King Jigme Singye Wangchuck announced his intention to abdicate in his son's favour in 2008, and that he would begin handing over responsibility to him immediately. On 9 December 2006, the former king issued a Royal Edict announcing his abdication, and transferred the throne to Jigme Khesar Namgyel Wangchuck, who was officially crowned on 6 November 2008, in Punakha. Religious ceremonies and public celebrations were also held at Tashichho Dzong and Changlimithang Stadium in Thimphu. The coronation ceremony comprised an ancient and colourful ritual, attended by few selected foreign friends of the royal family and dignitaries, including the then-President of India, Pratibha Patil.

To welcome Khesar as king of Bhutan, people painted street signs, hung festive banners and decorated traffic circles with fresh flowers. He received white, yellow, red, green, and blue silk scarves.

== Marriage ==
=== Royal wedding ===
As he opened the session of parliament on Friday, 20 May 2011, the king announced his engagement to Jetsun Pema, born in Thimphu on 4 June 1990. They were married on 13 October 2011 in Punakha Dzong. The wedding was Bhutan's largest media event ever. The ceremony, held in traditional style with the "Blessings of the Guardian Deities", was held in Punakha, followed by a royal tour of the country. During the ceremony, the king also received the Phoenix Crown of the Druk Gyaltsuen (Dragon Queen) from the most sacred Machhen Temple of the Dzong, and crowned Jetsun Pema, then formally proclaiming her as queen consort.

=== Children ===
The King and Queen announced the arrival of their son Jigme Namgyel Wangchuck, who was born in Lingkana Palace in Thimphu, on 5 February 2016. Their second son was born in Lingkana Palace in Thimphu on 19 March 2020. On 30 June 2020, the Royal Family announced that the second Gyalsey had been named Jigme Ugyen Wangchuck. On 9 September 2023, the King announced that the Queen had given birth to their third child and only daughter at the Lingkana Palace. The baby's name, Sonam Yangden Wangchuck, was announced on 9 December 2023.

== Reign ==
=== Democratisation ===
The young king began his reign overseeing the democratisation of Bhutan by presiding over the last sessions of the parliament where electoral laws, land reform and other important issues were debated. He said that the responsibility of this generation of Bhutanese was to ensure the success of democracy. He traveled extensively to explain and discuss the Draft Constitution of Bhutan with the people and to encourage participation in the upcoming democratic exercises. He continues such visits, speaking mainly to young people on the need for Bhutanese to strive for higher standards in education, business, civil service, and the need for people of a small country to work harder than those of others.

On 17 February 2021, he signed the abolishment of anti-homosexuality laws into law, effectively decriminalising same-sex activity in the kingdom, after the repeal of such laws had been approved by both houses in 2020. Tashi Tsheten, of the LGBT organisation Queer Voices of Bhutan, welcomed the king's decision as a milestone and expressed gratitude to the king and every politician involved in making the decriminalisation possible. Additionally, Tea Braun of the organisation Human Dignity Trust said that Bhutan had made a "step forward" by legalising homosexual activity.

=== Diplomacy ===
The king signed a new treaty of friendship with India in February 2007, replacing the treaty of 1949. Many government initiatives were undertaken by the new king with a view to strengthen the system in preparation for democratic changes in 2008. The Constitution of Bhutan was adopted on 18 July 2008 after legislation dictated that the National Council and the National Assembly was to be elected democratically.

=== Land reform ===
The king's first landmark project after his formal coronation was launching the National Cadastral Resurvey in March 2009, aimed at resolving long-standing issues of excess land that affect every Bhutanese household. A variation of land reform focuses on improving the lives of people living in remote and difficult areas, with the Rehabilitation Project. The pilot Rehabilitation Project at Khinadang in Pemagatshel was initiated in June 2011, and inaugurated by Prince Gyaltshab Jigme Dorji Wangchuck on 28 October 2014. The Project resettled people living in less accessible areas to villages, and provided them with basic amenities and services, as well as support in agriculture. The project saw tremendous success, and similar projects are in the pipeline in other parts of Bhutan.

=== Kidu ===
One of the most important and ongoing works of the king involves Kidu, a tradition based on the rule of a Dharma king whose sacred duty is to care for his people. The people can access Kidu in several ways: by applying to the Office of the Royal Chamberlain, which accepts applications during working hours; by sending applications through Dzongkhag Kidu Officers in every district, whose responsibility is to collect such applications as well as identify people who need help; and by appealing to the king directly. To give the people the opportunity for direct appeal, the king on his numerous road trips across the country stops for every potential appellant along the road.

There are several Kidu schemes designed to help certain groups of people, such as students unable to afford even the free education available in the country, elderly citizens, and those requiring medical treatment. The king has also continued the tradition of giving state land to landless farmers around the country. The ongoing project takes him to remote villages and communities. Kidu includes providing immediate assistance to victims of natural disasters. The king personally supervised the rebuilding efforts following major earthquakes and floods in 2009 and 2011.

In 2012, the king granted Nu.100 million from the Armed Forces to the Zhung Dratshang for the Dzong Reconstruction Fund, as on 24 June, the historic Wangdue Phodrang Dzong was destroyed by fire. As Supreme Commander of the Armed Forces, he commanded the armed forces and De-Suups to the site immediately, and with help from dzongkhag officials and citizens, many things were saved from the fire.

=== DeSuung Training Programme ===
The king initiated military-style training for volunteers known as the De-Suung Training Programme, DeSuung meaning "Guardians of Peace", in 2011, on the request of the youth. The programme aims to equip volunteers with the skill to provide assistance during emergencies, and has been hugely successful, with more than 3000 volunteers having completed their training and volunteering for public events and emergencies. Graduates of the program are known as DeSuups and wear orange jumpsuits. They live by the DeSuung Honour Code, which is to "keep service to their nation before their own safety and comfort".

=== Gyalsuung National Service ===
In December 2019, during the 112th National Day, the king announced the initiation of a one-year national service for all eighteen-year-olds, starting in 2024. The Gyalsuung training includes four months of military-style training and a nine-month educational course on agriculture, entrepreneurship, computers, coding, and health sciences. The first batch will start training in September 2024 for four months, and from second batch it will be a year-long training, with 4 months of military training.

=== Amnesty ===
The Constitution of Bhutan empowers the king to grant amnesty to prisoners. In 2014 he pardoned 45 prisoners who had been imprisoned for possessing an excessive amount of tobacco, following an amendment of the Tobacco Control Act of Bhutan 2010 by the Parliament of Bhutan, since the amended law could not be enforced retroactively, and previous offenders who would not be liable now would still be tried under previous laws. The Royal Pardon was granted to those who were not repeat offenders and had good prison records.

=== Economy ===
As of 2026, he planned to introduce capitalist economic reforms. This economic system has already been called "Mindful Capitalism", which the party Druk Thuendrel Tshogpa supports and also the politician Tshering Tobgay.

== Public perception and popularity abroad ==
The "People's king", like his father, enjoys warm relations with India. He has visited India on several occasions, and was invited as the Chief Guest for India's 64th Republic Day celebrations in 2013.

Following his 2006 visit to Thailand as crown prince, the king has been popular in Thailand. The number of Thai tourists visiting Bhutan increased from 100 in 2006 to 700 in 2007.

In November 2011, the King and Queen Jetsun Pema made a state visit to Japan; they were the first state guests to Japan since the 2011 earthquake. It was reported that the Japanese were fascinated by the king and queen of Bhutan.

In March 2015, the King and Queen were among the foreign dignitaries who attended the funeral of Singapore's former Prime Minister Lee Kuan Yew.

Also, the King and Queen attended the funeral of King Bhumibol Adulyadej of Thailand in October 2017 and the enthronement ceremony of Emperor Naruhito and Empress Masako of Japan in October 2019.

The King and Queen were also present at the 2022 funeral of Queen Elizabeth II and the 2023 coronation of King Charles III.

He is an alumnus of Magdalen College, Oxford. He has a large following of female fans in Thailand, where he was nicknamed 'Prince Charming' by the press.

== Honorary degrees ==
King Jigme has been conferred the following honorary degrees:

- Doctor of Laws from University of New Brunswick, Canada on 20 October 2005
- Doctor of Philosophy, Politics and Economics from Rangsit University, Thailand, on 26 November 2006
- Doctor of Law, from University of Calcutta, India, on 9 October 2010
- Doctor of Economics from Keio University, Japan, on 17 November 2011
- Doctor of Environment and Natural Resources, from Rajamangala University of Technology of Phra Nakhon (RMUTP), Thailand, on 12 November 2013
- Doctor of Public Health from Naresuan University, Thailand, Thailand, on 12 November 2013
- Doctor of Arts in Public and Private Management, from Christian University, Thailand, on 12 November 2013
- Doctor in Buddhism, from Maha Chulalongkorn Rajavidyalaya University, Thailand, on 19 June 2024
- Doctor of Science in agriculture, from Chiang Mai University, Thailand, on 19 June 2024
- Doctor of Philosophy in Science for Sustainable Local Development, from Chiang Mai Rajabhat University, Thailand, on 19 June 2024
- Doctor of Science in Agricultural Extension, from Khon Kaen University, Thailand, on 19 June 2024
- Doctor of Philosophy in Social Sciences, from Mae Fah Luang University, Thailand, on 19 June 2024
- Doctor of Organic Agriculture Management, from Maejo University, Thailand, on 19 June 2024
- Doctor of Creative Development, from Thammasat University, Thailand, on 19 June 2024
- Doctor in Ethical Innovation and Global Responsibility, from Chiba Institute of Technology, on 27 May 2025

== Foreign honours ==
- Tonga :
  - Knight Grand Cross of the Most Illustrious Order of Queen Sālote Tupou III (14/05/2010)
- Thailand :
  - Boy Scout Citation Medal of Vajira, First Class (27/10/2010)

== See also ==
- House of Wangchuck
- Jigme Khesar Strict Nature Reserve

== Notes ==
Jigme Khesar Namgyel Wangchuck House of Wangchuck Born: 21 February 1980
Regnal titles
Preceded by Jigme Singye Wangchuck	King of Bhutan; 2006–present	Incumbent; Heir apparent: Jigme Namgyel Wangchuck
