= List of official overseas trips made by Catherine, Princess of Wales =

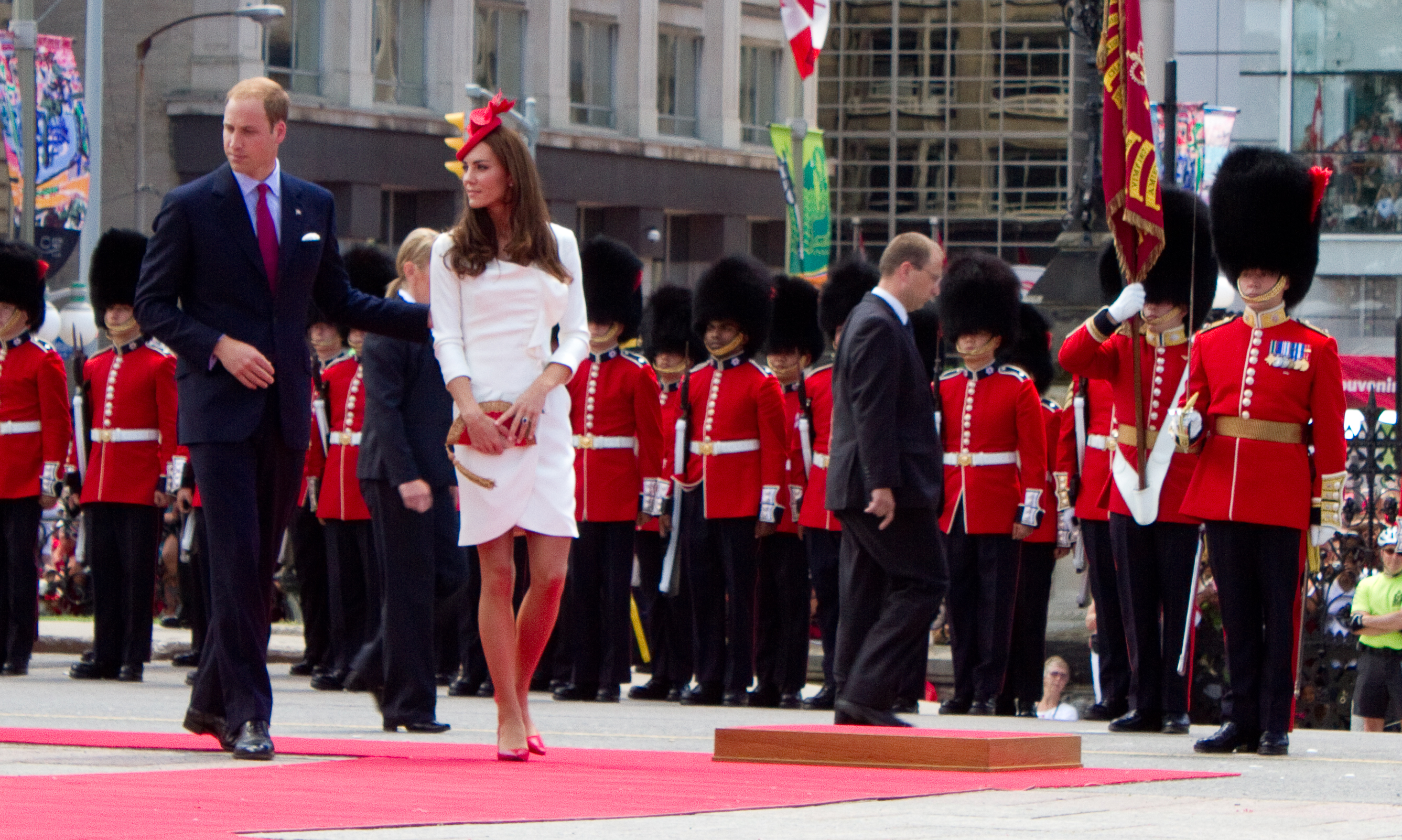
The Princess of Wales (then known as the Duchess of Cambridge) with her husband William in Ottawa, Canada during their first joint royal tour outside the United Kingdom from 30 June to 8 July 2011

This is a list of official overseas visits and Commonwealth tours made by Catherine, Princess of Wales. Catherine Middleton began undertaking official trips upon marrying into the British royal family in April 2011. She has since accompanied her husband, William, Prince of Wales, on visits and conducted solo overseas engagements on behalf of the United Kingdom. The couple also undertake tours of Commonwealth realms as the monarch's representatives or as members of the realm's royal family.

== Summary of official overseas visits ==
=== Solo visits ===
- One visit: Denmark, Italy, Luxembourg, Netherlands
- Two visits: France

=== Accompanying William ===
- One visit: Australia, The Bahamas, Belize, Bhutan, Denmark, Germany, Ireland, Jamaica, Jordan, Malaysia, New Zealand, Norway, Pakistan, Poland, Singapore, Solomon Islands, Sweden, Tuvalu
- Two visits: Belgium, Canada, India
- Three visits: France, United States of America

== List of official overseas visits ==
	Date	Country	Areas visited	Notes
1	30 June–8 July 2011	Canada	Ontario, Quebec, Prince Edward Island, Northwest Territories, Alberta	William and Catherine undertook their first official overseas tour together after their wedding to Canada on the 225th anniversary of the first royal visit to the country by William IV. The couple laid a wreath at the Canadian Tomb of the Unknown Soldier. Activities included attending a citizenship ceremony to mark Canada Day as well as celebrations at Parliament Hill with the prime minister of Canada. William and Catherine met with patients at the Sainte-Justine University Hospital Centre. The Duke delivered a speech at Quebec City Hall entirely in French. In PEI, the couple were welcomed by a traditional Miꞌkmaq smudging ceremony. In Alberta, the Duke and Duchess met with emergency workers and families affected by fires.
1	8–10 July 2011	United States	Los Angeles	The then Duke and Duchess visited California and attended an event at The Beverly Hilton supporting British trade. The couple then attended a BAFTA red carpet event, where the Duke gave a speech as its president. They visited the Santa Barbara Polo Club, where the Duke played a match benefiting The Royal Foundation. The couple also toured an art program helping disadvantaged children before greeting veterans at Sony Pictures Studios.
2	2 November 2011	Denmark	Copenhagen	The then Duke and Duchess met Crown Prince Frederik and Crown Princess Mary. The couple then visited the UNICEF Supply Division, which supplies food to children suffering from malnutrition and famine, and helped pack materials for distribution.
3	11–13 September 2012	Singapore	Singapore	The then Duke and Duchess of Cambridge visited Singapore as part of the Diamond Jubilee Tour on behalf of Queen Elizabeth II. The couple visited the Rainbow Centre, a school for children with special needs. The Duke and Duchess then viewed the "Dendrobium Memoria Princess Diana", an orchid named for the Duke's late mother bred at Singapore Botanic Gardens. In honor of their visit, the "Vanda William Catherine" was named for them. A state dinner was held in their honour by President Tony Tan at the Istana, where the Duke gave a speech and inspected the Honour Guard.
3	13–15 September 2012	Malaysia	Kuala Lumpur, Sabah	Catherine and William visited Malaysia as part of the Diamond Jubilee Tour on behalf of Queen Elizabeth II. The couple met with Malaysian Prime Minister Najib Razak and his wife. They later visited Hospis Malaysia, where the Duchess delivered a speech as part of her work with palliative care. The Duke and Duchess attended a state dinner hosted by King Abdul Halim of Kedah before visiting As Syakirin Mosque. The couple viewed a cultural event and met students at KLCC Park, after which the Duke made remarks at the British Malaysian Chamber of Commerce. They also visited Sabah, landing at Kota Kinabalu International Airport before travelling on to the Danum Valley Conservation Area.
3	16–18 September 2012	Solomon Islands	Honiara, Tavanipupu	The then Duke and Duchess of Cambridge visited the Solomon Islands as part of the Diamond Jubilee Tour on behalf of Queen Elizabeth II. The couple were welcomed with garlands and wore traditional dress for a dinner at the residence of the governor-general of Solomon Islands. The Duke and Duchess visited a village in Honiara, where Catherine met with local women to discuss gender inequality in the country. The couple then observed a warrior dance and were presented with traditional jewelry in Marau.
3	18–19 September 2012	Tuvalu	Funafuti	The then Duke and Duchess of Cambridge visited Tuvalu as part of the Diamond Jubilee Tour on behalf of Queen Elizabeth II. Keeping with the tradition of carrying visitors who arrive by sea, the couple were carried on multicoloured thrones to meet the then Prime Minister of Tuvalu Willy Telavi. Later that day, the couple met students at a primary school, watched a canoe race, and participated in a traditional dancing celebration.
4	7–16 April 2014	New Zealand	Wellington, Blenheim, Auckland, Hamilton, Cambridge, Dunedin, Queenstown, Christchurch	At the invitation of the Government of New Zealand, the then Duke and Duchess of Cambridge were accompanied by their son, Prince George, on their tour of the country. The family met with Prime Minister of New Zealand John Key and received a traditional Maori welcome at the governor-general of New Zealand's residence, greeting with a hongi. The couple visited the families and children at the Plunket Society and participated in a yacht race at the home of New Zealand America's Cup team. The Duke and Duchess also laid a wreath in Blenheim to mark the 100 year anniversary of World War I before touring the Omaka Aviation Heritage Centre, led by Sir Peter Jackson.
4	16–25 April 2014	Australia	Sydney, Brisbane, Uluru, Adelaide, Canberra	At the invitation of the Government of Australia, the then Duke and Duchess of Cambridge were accompanied by their son, Prince George, on their tour of the country. The couple met young leaders of the arts and sports at Sydney Opera House, where the Duke gave a speech. The family then attended the Royal Easter Show before meeting survivors of bushfires in damaged areas. The Duke and Duchess visited the RAAF Base Amberley and attended a service at St Andrew's Cathedral marking Easter. The couple met indigenous artists and students in Yulara, then participating in Anzac Day commemorations at the Australian War Memorial. Prime Minister of Australia Tony Abbott greeted the family before their departure.
5	6 June 2014	France	Arromanches	The then Duke and Duchess of Cambridge, along with Queen Elizabeth II, attended the commemoration of the 70th anniversary of the Normandy Landings at Gold Beach. The Duke gave remarks at the service and the couple attended a tea party, meeting veterans who served in World War II.
6	4 August 2014	Belgium	Liège	The then Duke and Duchess met with King Philippe and Queen Mathilde of Belgium at the Saint-Laurent Abbey, where the Duke laid a poppy wreath at the British memorial. The Duke and Duchess attended First World War centenary commemorations at the Cointe Inter Allied Memorial, where the William gave the speech. The couple also paid their respects at the Saint Symphorien Military Cemetery.
7	7–9 December 2014	United States	New York City, Washington, D.C.	The then Duke and Duchess conducted a three-day tour on the east coast of the United States. The couple visited the National September 11 Memorial and Museum and attended an NBA basketball game. The Duke attended an anti-poaching hosted by the World Bank Group and gave a speech as part of his work on wildlife protection. William met US President Barack Obama at the White House as well as Vice President Joe Biden and his wife, Jill Biden. Catherine toured a child development center in Harlem, meeting children and helping wrap presents. The Duke and Duchess then attended a black-tie fundraiser at the Metropolitan Museum of Art to benefit their alma mater, the University of St Andrews.
8	10–13 April 2016	India	Mumbai, Delhi, Kaziranga	At the request of HM Government, the then Duke and Duchess of Cambridge undertook a tour of the country. The couple met residents of Banganga Tank and visited children benefitting from multiple charities, including Childline India. They later laid a wreath at the Martyr's Memorial in honour of the victims of the 2008 Mumbai terrorist attacks. The Duke and Duchess also attended a Bollywood charity gala and paid their respects at Gandhi Smriti. William and Catherine met with Prime Minister of India Narendra Modi and attended a garden party in honour of the queen's 90th birthday at the British High Commission.
8	14–16 April 2016	Bhutan	Thimphu	At the request of HM Government, the then Duke and Duchess undertook a two-day visit of country. The couple met with King Jigme Khesar Namgyel Wangchuck and Queen Jetsun Pema at the Tashichho Dzong on the grounds of Lingkana Palace, participating in a temple blessing. The Duke and Duchess then hiked and met with monks at Paro Taktsang and attended an evening reception for British expats.
8	16 April 2016	India	Agra	The then Duke and Duchess visited India to tour the Taj Mahal in Agra.
9	30 June–1 July 2016	France	Thiepval	The then Duke and Duchess of Cambridge and Prince Harry accompanied Prince Charles to attended centenary commemorations for the Battle of the Somme at the Thiepval Memorial, where the Duke gave a poetry reading written by Sebastian Faulks.
10	24 September– 1 October 2016	Canada	British Columbia, Yukon	The then Duke and Duchess of Cambridge were accompanied by their children, Prince George and Princess Charlotte, on their official tour of Canada. The family met with the prime minister of Canada Justin Trudeau and witnessed a First Nations traditional greeting. The Duke laid a wreath at the Victoria Cenotaph and attended a forum for Vancouver first responders. The couple also visited charities working with social cases and addiction within children. The Duke and Duchess visited the Immigrant Services Society as well as the Great Bear Rainforest to mark the preservation of the indigenous forest, visiting Heiltsuk and Yukon communities. The couple and their children also attended a play-day alongside Canadian military families.
11	11 October 2016	Netherlands	South Holland	The then Duchess undertook her first solo official overseas visit, meeting with King Willem-Alexander at his Wassenaar residence. She then visited the Mauritshuis Museum's display of Vermeer's work from the British Royal Collection. The Duchess also attended a meeting at the British ambassador's residence discussing programs on addiction and mental health in Holland.
12	17–18 March 2017	France	Paris	At the request of the Foreign and Commonwealth Office, the then Duke and Duchess undertook a two-day visit to the country. The couple met with the president of France François Hollande at the Élysée Palace and attended a reception at the Embassy of the United Kingdom in Paris, where the Duke gave a speech regarding Anglo-French links. The couple then visited Les Invalides, meeting with veterans alongside two survivors of the Paris terror attacks. The Duke and Duchess also toured the Musée d’Orsay before attending a France v. Wales rugby match.
13	11 May 2017	Luxembourg	Luxembourg City	The then Duchess of Cambridge attended Treaty of London commemorations, visited an exhibition of British artists at the Grand Duke Jean Museum of Modern Art, and attended a "cycling-themed festival."
14	17–19 July 2017	Poland	Warsaw, Gdańsk	At the request of the Foreign and Commonwealth Office, the then Duke and Duchess of Cambridge were accompanied by their children, Prince George and Princess Charlotte, on their visit to the country. William and Catherine met with the president of Poland Andrzej Duda and his wife, Agata Duda at the Presidential Palace. Afterward, they met with veterans at the Warsaw Rising Museum before attending a garden party in honour of the Queen Elizabeth II's birthday. The Duke and Duchess visited Stutthof concentration camp and met with former prisoners, paying their respects at a memorial. The couple later toured the European Solidarity Centre after attending a local cultural display.
14	19–21 July 2017	Germany	Berlin, Heidelberg, Hamburg	At the request of the Foreign and Commonwealth Office, the then Duke and Duchess were accompanied by their children, Prince George and Princess Charlotte, on their visit to the country. The couple met with the chancellor of Germany Angela Merkel before visiting the Brandenburg Gate. The Duke and Duchess also visited an organisation assisting disadvantaged children before meeting President of Germany Frank-Walter Steinmeier at the Bellevue Palace. They also visited small businesses in Heidelberg before touring the German Cancer Research Center to learn about stem cell research.
15	30–31 July 2017	Belgium	Ypres	The then Duke and Duchess accompanied the prime minister of the United Kingdom Theresa May in the commemorations to mark the centenary of the Battle of Passchendaele. The Duke laid a wreath alongside King Philippe of Belgium.
16	30–31 January 2018	Sweden	Stockholm	At the request of the Foreign and Commonwealth Office, the then Duke and Duchess of Cambridge visited Sweden. The couple were accompanied on engagements by Crown Princess Victoria and Prince Daniel of Sweden throughout the trip. They attended a reception at Fotografiska and visited an exhibition on UK design before visiting Haga Palace. The Duke and Duchess visited local schools and attended meetings on mental health The couple also met with Prime Minister of Sweden Stefan Löfven and his wife, Ulla Löfven before touring the ArkDes and Nobel Museums. William and Catherine also met King Carl XVI Gustaf and his wife, Queen Silvia at the Royal Palace of Stockholm.
16	1–2 February 2018	Norway	Oslo	At the request of the Foreign and Commonwealth Office, the then Duke and Duchess toured Norway. The couple met with Crown Prince Haakon, Crown Princess Mette-Marit, King Harald V and Queen Sonja at the Royal Palace. A state banquet was hosted in their honour. The Duke and Duchess also visited Hartvig Nissen School and attended an event in Holmenkollen hosted by the Norwegian Ski Federation.
17	14–18 October 2019	Pakistan	Islamabad, Lahore, Chitral	At the request of the Foreign and Commonwealth Office, the then Duke and Duchess visited the country. The tour marked the first visit by members of the royal family to the country in 13 years. The couple met with the prime minister of Pakistan Imran Khan before visiting students at the Islamabad Modern College for Girls, and attended a reception at the Pakistan National Monument. The couple met with patients at Shaukat Khanum Memorial Cancer Hospital and toured the Badshahi Mosque before learning about conservation at Margalla Hills National Park. The Duke and Duchess also visited the SOS Children's Village, where Catherine gave remarks surrounding her early years work and discussed their trip with CNN.
18	3–5 March 2020	Ireland	Dublin, County Meath, County Kildare, Galway	At the request of the Foreign and Commonwealth Office, the then Duke and Duchess visited the country. The couple met with the president of Ireland Michael D. Higgins and Taoiseach Leo Varadkar before laying a wreath at Dublin's Garden of Remembrance. They attended a reception at the Guinness Storehouse and visited youth mental health centres and social justice charities before showcasing cultural programmes in Galway as part of their 2020 European Capital of Culture designation.
19	22–23 February 2022	Denmark	Copenhagen	The then Duchess of Cambridge visited the University of Copenhagen to learn about its mental health projects focused on early childhood development. She was received by Queen Margrethe II and joined Crown Princess Mary for a visit to the Mary Foundation's project to protect vulnerable women and children.
20	19–22 March 2022	Belize	Belize City, Hopkins, Belize Barrier Reef, Caracol, Chiquibul Forest, Cahal Pech	The then Duke and Duchess of Cambridge visited Belize as part of the Platinum Jubilee Tour on behalf of Queen Elizabeth II. Upon their arrival, they were greeted by Governor-General Dame Froyla Tzalam, and later met with the prime minister of Belize Johnny Briceño and his wife. During their tour of Belize, the couple visited historic Mayan sites, explored Belize's world-famous Maya chocolate making, and celebrated the rich culture of the Garifuna community in Hopkins. The Duke and Duchess also learned about the restoration efforts of Belize Barrier Reef being led by communities across the country. They also scuba-dived to learn more about the second-largest barrier reef in the world. A planned visit to the Akte 'il Ha cacao farm in Indian Creek was scrapped due to local protests by residents over lack of consultation about the local football pitch earmarked for the Duke and Duchess's helicopter landing as well as the residents' ongoing dispute over land with Fauna and Flora International, of which William is a patron. At a reception by the governor-general at Cahal Pech, the Duke emphasised safeguarding democracy and added that they stood in solidarity with Ukraine amid the 2022 Russian invasion of the country.
20	22–24 March 2022	Jamaica	Kingston, Trench Town, Spanish Town, Montego Bay	The then Duke and Duchess of Cambridge visited Jamaica as part of the Platinum Jubilee Tour on behalf of Queen Elizabeth II. They met the governor-general Sir Patrick Allen and his wife at King's House, and were later received by the prime minister of Jamaica Andrew Holness and his wife, who during a meeting with the couple stated that their nation was "moving on and we intend to attain in short order our development goals and fulfil our true ambitions and destiny as an independent, developed, prosperous country". During their Jamaican tour, the couple joined young football players in Trench Town, and celebrated the legacy of Bob Marley and other Jamaican musicians. At the Shortwood Teachers' College, the couple met students who are training to become early childhood education practitioners. At Spanish Town Hospital, the couple met frontline workers, and they later interacted with members of the Jamaica Defence Force at Flankers, near Montego Bay. A demonstration by the Advocates Network, a human rights coalition of Jamaican activists and equalities organisations, took place near the British High Commission in Kingston to ask for an apology and compensation from the Crown for chattel slavery. The coalition also penned an open letter signed by 100 Jamaican figures to demand an apology in order "to begin a process of healing, forgiveness, reconciliation and compensation". In a speech delivered at the dinner hosted by the governor-general, the Duke expressed his "profound sorrow" over slavery, adding that it "should never have happened" and "forever stains our history". On their final day in Jamaica, the couple attended the inaugural Commissioning Parade for service personnel from across the Caribbean who had recently completed the Caribbean Military Academy's Officer Training Programme.
20	24–26 March 2022	The Bahamas	Nassau, Great Abaco, Grand Bahama	The then Duke and Duchess of Cambridge visited The Bahamas as part of the Platinum Jubilee Tour on behalf of Queen Elizabeth II. After their arrival, they were greeted by the governor-general Cornelius A. Smith, and they later had a meeting with the prime minister of the Bahamas Philip Davis and his wife. The Rastafarian groups planned a protest on the following day to ask for reparations from Great Britain for slavery, while the Bahamas National Reparations Committee penned an open letter regarding the issue. During their visit, the couple spent time with communities across the Bahamas and attended a world-famous junkanoo parade and the Bahamas Platinum Jubilee Sailing Regatta. In a speech given at the reception hosted by the governor-general, the Duke assured the three Caribbean nations that the monarchy would "support with pride and respect your decisions about your future. Relationships evolve. Friendship endures". He reiterated these sentiments in a statement released at the end of the tour, saying "I know that this tour has brought into even sharper focus questions about the past and the future. In Belize, Jamaica and The Bahamas, that future is for the people to decide upon".
21	30 November–2 December 2022	United States	Boston	The Prince and Princess of Wales visited Boston to attend the second Earthshot Prize awards ceremony on 2 December. Upon their arrival, they were received by the governor and the first lady of Massachusetts. Later on, they met Boston mayor Michelle Wu and governor-elect of Massachusetts Maura Healey at Boston City Hall. They also visited local environmental, educational and community projects. Catherine visited the Center on the Developing Child at Harvard University and William toured the John F. Kennedy Presidential Library and Museum alongside Caroline Kennedy. The Prince also met with President Joe Biden on the final day of their visit.
22	1 June 2023	Jordan	Amman	The Prince and Princess of Wales travelled to Jordan to attend the wedding of Hussein, Crown Prince of Jordan, and Rajwa Al Saif. Later in the day, the Prince and Princess attended a banquet in celebration of the wedding.
23	9 September 2023	France	Marseille	The Princess of Wales, in her role as patron of the Rugby Football Union and Rugby Football League, attended the 2023 Rugby World Cup Group Stage match between England and Argentina.
24	14–15 October 2023	France	Marseille	The Princess of Wales, in her role as patron of the Rugby Football Union and Rugby Football League, attended the 2023 Rugby World Cup Quarter Final match between England and Fiji.
25	13–14 May 2026	Italy	Reggio Emilia	The Princess of Wales travelled to Reggio Emilia on 13 May as part of her work on early childhood development with a focus on the Reggio Emilia approach. The same day, she received the city's highest honour, Primo Tricolore, and later visited the Loris Malaguzzi International Centre and Scuola Comunale d'Infanzia Anna Frank (Anna Frank Municipal Preschool). The following day, she visited Scuola Salvador Allende (Salvador Allende Preschool), where she observed and took part in outdoor learning activities with the children, and REMIDA, a sustainability project using waste to benefit children. Her final engagement was at Agriturismo Al Vigneto, where she prepared lunch and was joined by educators, families, business leaders, and community figures.
26	16–18 November 2026	India	Mumbai, New Delhi	The Prince and Princess of Wales travelled to Mumbai to attend the sixth Earthshot Prize awards ceremony on 17 November. The couple took part in multiple engagements in the city, including cricket and travelling on the Mumbai Metro. William and Catherine also attended the Earthshot Impact assembly. The couple attended the inaugural Children's Earthshot on 17 November to recognise environmental innovators aged 9 to 17. Catherine also visited Nowrosjee Wadia Maternity Hospital on 18 November. Later that day, the couple also met Narendra Modi, the Prime Minister of India, in New Delhi.

== See also ==
- Foreign relations of the United Kingdom
- Soft power of the United Kingdom
- List of official overseas trips made by Charles III
- List of state visits made by Elizabeth II
- List of Commonwealth official trips made by Elizabeth II
- List of official overseas trips made by William, Prince of Wales
