= List of official overseas trips made by William, Prince of Wales =

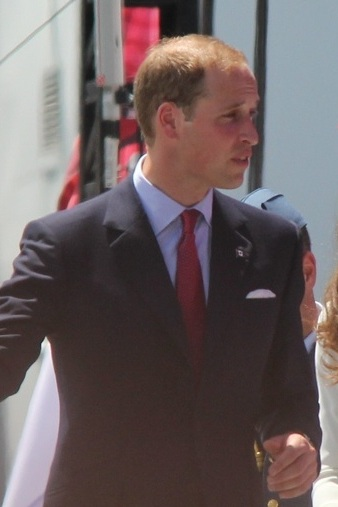
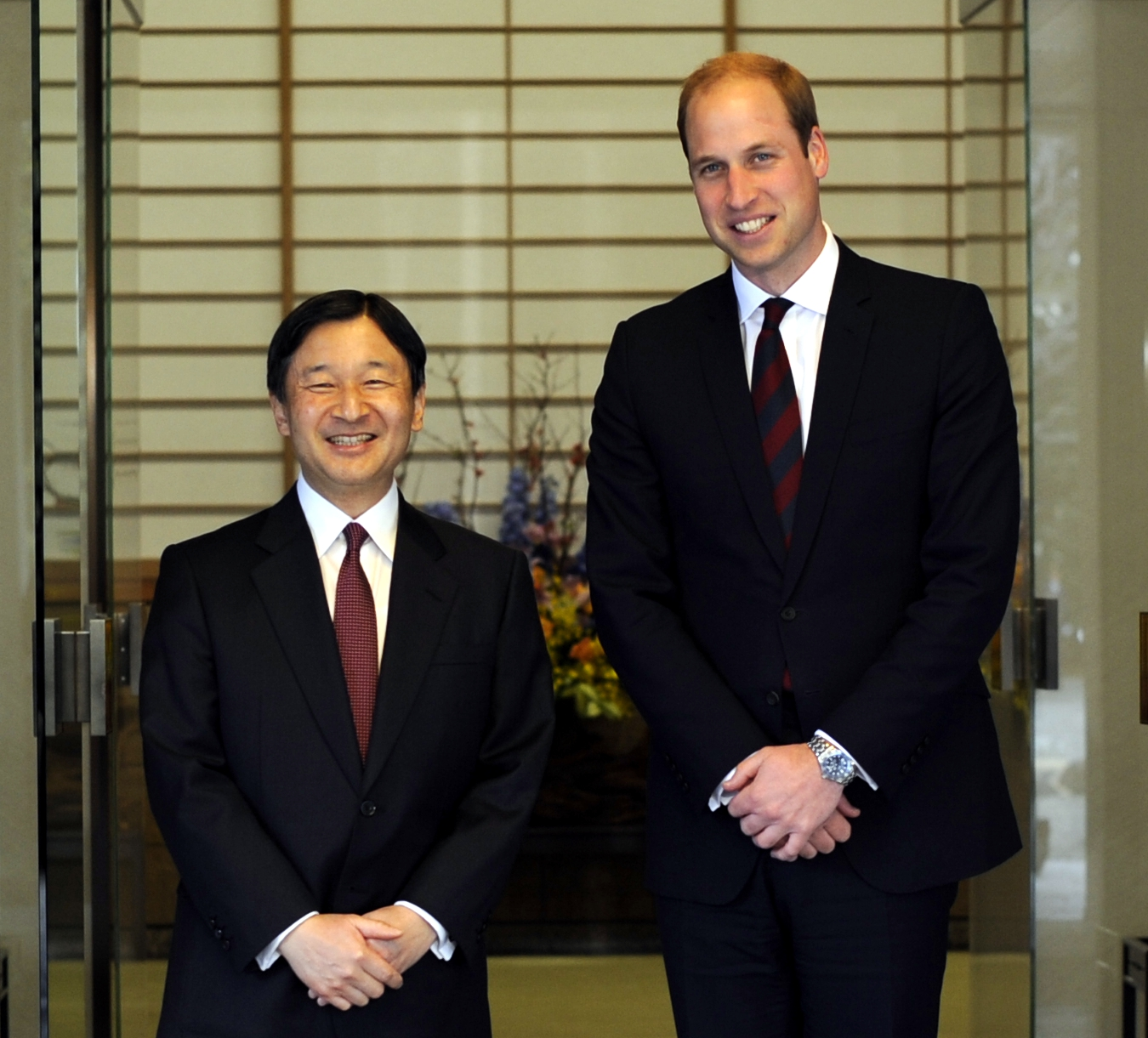
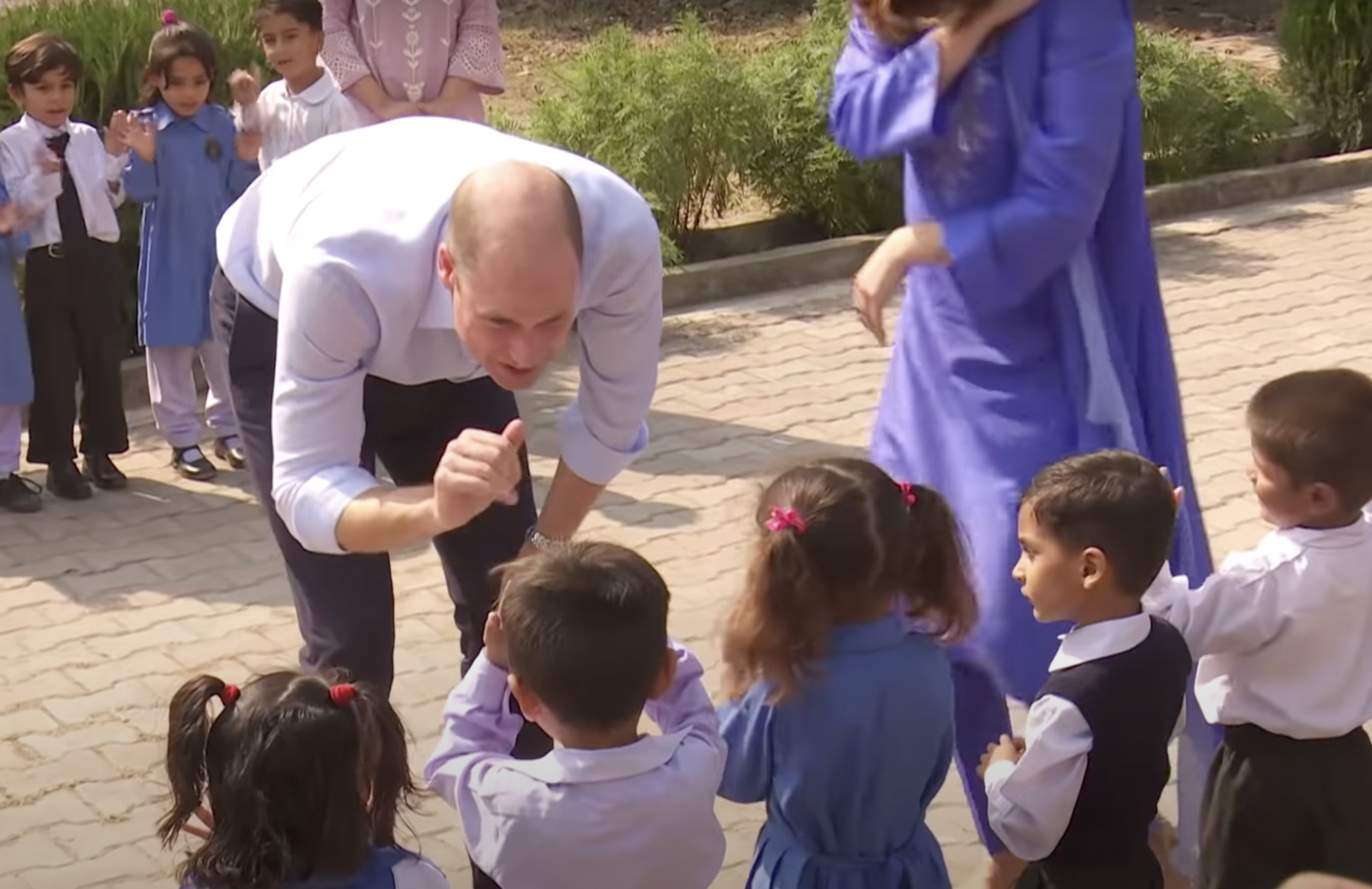
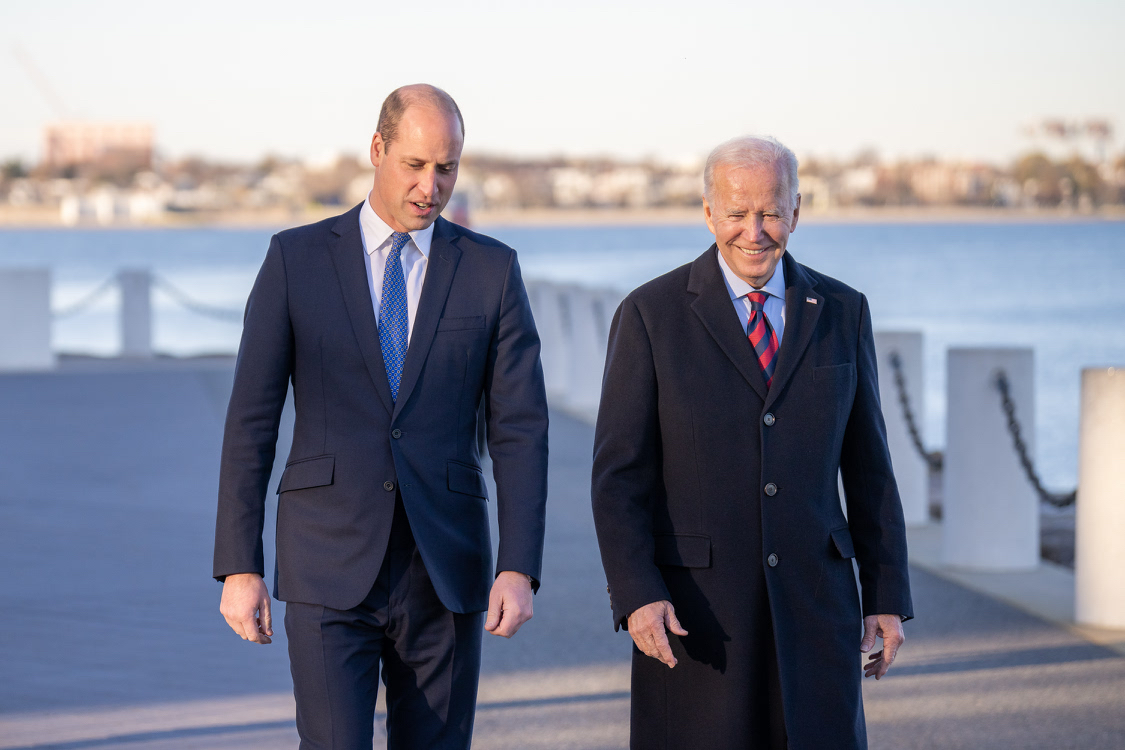
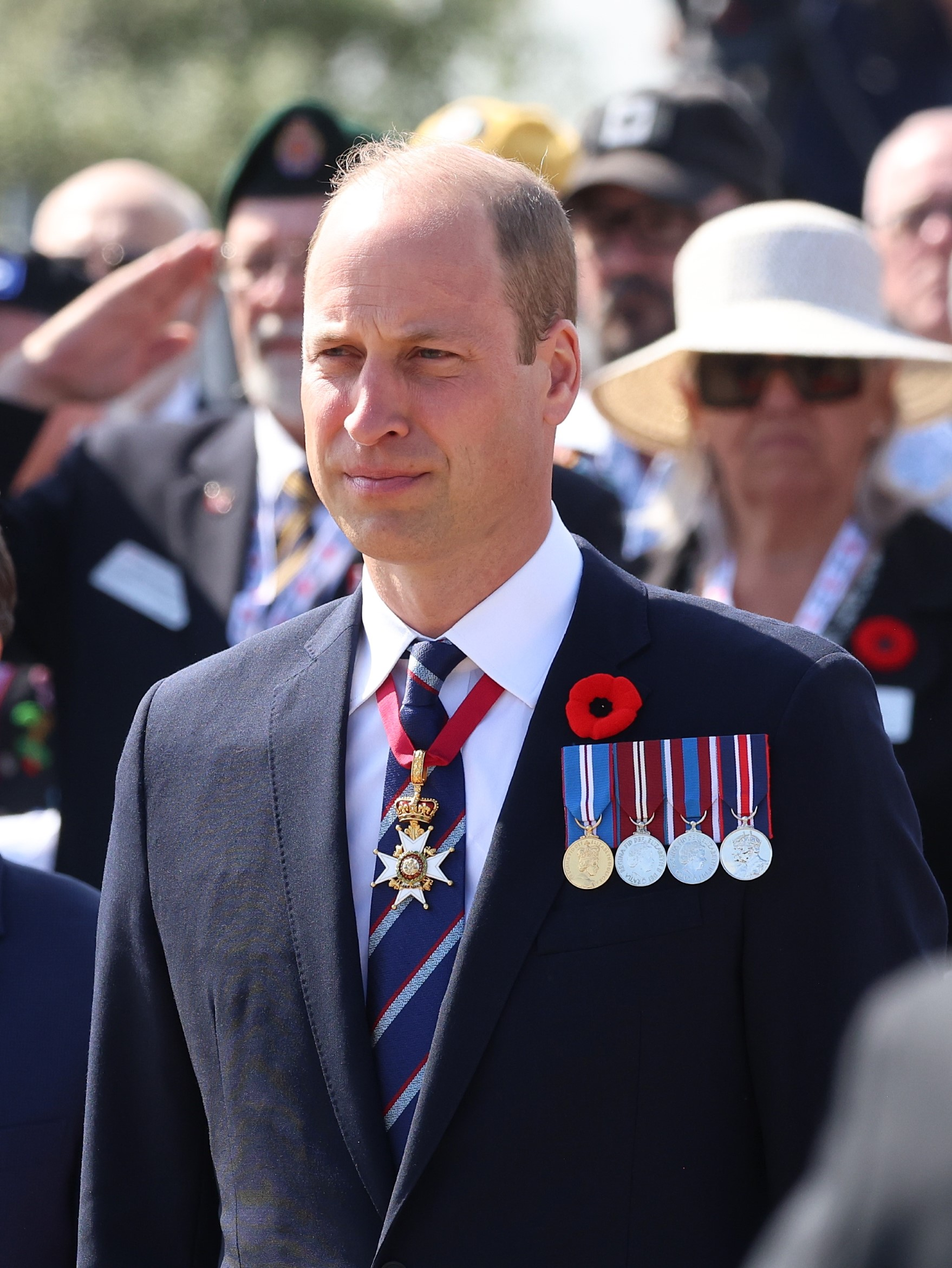
Scenes of William, Prince of Wales, in his overseas trips (from left to right):
- Top row
  - In Canada, July 2011
  - With then-Crown Prince Naruhito of Japan, February 2015
  - In Pakistan, October 2019
- Bottom row
  - With then-US President Joe Biden, December 2022
  - In France, June 2024

This is a list of official overseas visits and Commonwealth tours made by William, Prince of Wales. He is the heir apparent of the United Kingdom. As a child, William travelled with his parents, King Charles III (then Prince of Wales) and Diana, Princess of Wales. He presently undertakes official overseas visits on behalf of the monarch. His wife, Catherine, began accompanying him on official tours following their marriage in 2011. William's travels have included most Commonwealth realms and a wide range of countries across Europe, Asia, Africa, and the Americas.

== Summary of official overseas visits ==
William

- One visit: Afghanistan, Akrotiri and Dhekelia, The Bahamas, Belize, Brazil, Bhutan, Botswana, China, Denmark, Estonia, Finland, Ireland, Israel, Jamaica, Japan, Lesotho, Malaysia, Malta, Monaco, Namibia, Oman, Pakistan, Palestine, Solomon Islands, Saudi Arabia, Sweden, Tanzania, Tuvalu, Vatican City, Vietnam
- Two visits: India, Italy, Jordan, Kenya, Kuwait, Norway, Poland, Singapore, United Arab Emirates
- Three visits: South Africa
- Four visits: Australia, Belgium, Canada, United States of America
- Five visits: Switzerland
- Six visits: Germany, New Zealand
- Nine visits: France

Accompanying Catherine

- One visit: Akrotiri and Dhekelia, Australia, The Bahamas, Belize, Bhutan, Denmark, Germany, Ireland, Jamaica, Jordan, Malaysia, New Zealand, Norway, Pakistan, Poland, Singapore, Solomon Islands, Sweden, Tuvalu
- Two visits: Belgium, Canada, India
- Three visits: France, United States

== List ==
	Date	Country	Areas visited	Notes
1	20 March – 17 April 1983	Australia	Alice Springs, Canberra, Melbourne	William accompanied his parents, Charles and Diana. While they conducted engagements, William resided at Woomargama Station.
1	17–30 April 1983	New Zealand	Auckland	William accompanied his parents, Charles and Diana.
2	5–10 May 1985	Italy	Venice	William accompanied his parents, Charles and Diana. (Note: William's brother, Harry, was also present for this visit.) The family travelled by the Royal Yacht Britannia.
3	22–27 October 1991	Canada	Toronto, Ottawa, Niagara Falls	William accompanied his parents, Charles and Diana. William's itinerary included touring the Royal Ontario Museum, as well as the CN Tower in Toronto. He also visited Niagara Falls with his mother.
4	23–24 March 1998	Canada	Vancouver	William accompanied his father, Charles. He visited the H. R. MacMillan Space Centre and did a walkabout at Burnaby South Secondary School.
5	28 June – 10 July 2005	New Zealand	Wellington, Auckland	William undertook his first overseas tour solo in New Zealand on invitation to support the British & Irish Lions rugby team during their matches. While there, William also represented Elizabeth II at two official engagements to commemorate the end of World War II.
6	10 June 2006	Germany	Frankfurt	In his capacity as president of The Football Association (FA), William attended a group stage match of the 2006 FIFA World Cup.
7	October 2008	South Africa		William took part in the Enduro Africa bike trek to raise money for charities.
8	27 May 2009	Italy	Rome	In his capacity as president of the FA, William attended the 2009 UEFA Champions League final at the Stadio Olimpico in Rome.
9	17–19 January 2010	New Zealand	Wellington, Auckland	At the invitation of the Government of New Zealand, William toured the country and represented Elizabeth II at the opening of the Supreme Court building. He paid a visit to the newly built Eden Park, where he was welcomed with a traditional Māori greeting at Kapiti Island. William also toured nature reserves. He met both the then-Prime Minister of New Zealand, John Key, and the then-Governor-General of New Zealand, Anand Satyanand. He also visited the children's ward at the Wellington Hospital and met with defence force troops at the National War Memorial.
9	19–21 January 2010	Australia	Sydney, Melbourne	William visited the Sydney Botanical Gardens, as well as a community centre in Redfern. He then met with the 3rd Royal Australian Regiment at the Holsworthy Barracks. William also spent a day touring areas surrounding Melbourne damaged by bushfires in 2009, meeting with survivors and participating in a cricket game.
10	15–16 June 2010	Botswana	Gaborone	William undertook engagements overseas while touring Southern Africa. His visit to Botswana was on behalf of the Tusk Trust, of which William is patron. William visited Mokolodi Nature Reserve, reviewing their conservation and educational projects surrounding environmental protection to mark their 20th anniversary.
10	16–17 June 2010	Lesotho	Semonkong	William's visit to Lesotho was on behalf of Sentebale, of which his brother Harry is patron. He visited a rural primary school and reviewed their projects surrounding vulnerable children and orphans.
10	18–19 June 2010	South Africa	Cape Town	In support of the FA's bid to host the 2018 FIFA World Cup, William, in his capacity as their president, attended an opening round of the 2010 FIFA World Cup and met members of the FIFA Executive Committee.
11	14 November 2010	Afghanistan	Camp Bastion	William laid a wreath and attended a Service of Remembrance to pay homage to British and Commonwealth sailors, soldiers, and airmen. He also attended a parade before meeting with troops from the NATO-led International Security Assistance Force and visiting Camp Bastion's medical centre.
12	30 November – 2 December 2010	Switzerland	Zurich	In his capacity as president of the Football Association, William attended meetings in support of the FA's bid to host the 2018 FIFA World Cup.
13	17–18 March 2011	New Zealand	Christchurch, Greymouth	At the invitation of the Prime Minister of New Zealand, William visited parts of the country affected by the 2011 Christchurch earthquake. He attended a memorial service on behalf of Elizabeth II and later met with survivors and coordinators of emergency and relief services. William also visited Greymouth, near the site of the Pike River Mine disaster.
13	19–21 March 2011	Australia	Queensland, Victoria	At the invitation of the Prime Minister of Australia, William visited the flood damaged areas of Queensland and Victoria, meeting with survivors and Red Cross workers.
14	30 June – 8 July 2011	Canada	Ontario, Quebec, Prince Edward Island, Northwest Territories, Alberta	William undertook a tour to Canada on the 225th anniversary of the first royal visit to the country by William IV. (Note: William's wife, Catherine, was also present for this visit.) He laid a wreath at the Canadian Tomb of the Unknown Soldier. Other activities included attending a citizenship ceremony to mark Canada Day, as well as celebrations at Parliament Hill with the then-Prime Minister of Canada, Stephen Harper. William also met with patients at the Sainte-Justine University Hospital Centre. He delivered a speech at Quebec City Hall entirely in French. In Prince Edward Island, William was welcomed by a traditional Mi'kmaq smudging ceremony. In Alberta, he met with emergency workers and families affected by fires.
14	8–10 July 2011	United States	Los Angeles	William visited California and attended an event at The Beverly Hilton supporting British trade. He then attended a BAFTA red carpet event, where he gave a speech as its president. William visited the Santa Barbara Polo Club, where he played a match benefiting The Royal Foundation. William also toured an art program helping disadvantaged children before greeting veterans at Sony Pictures Studios.
15	2 November 2011	Denmark	Copenhagen	William met Frederik X, then Crown Prince of Denmark, and Queen Mary, then Crown Princess of Denmark. William then visited the UNICEF Supply Division, which supplies food to children suffering from malnutrition and famine, and helped pack materials for distribution.
16	11–13 September 2012	Singapore	Singapore	William traveled to Singapore as part of the Diamond Jubilee of Elizabeth II. He visited the Rainbow Centre, a school for children with special needs. William then viewed the "Dendrobium Memoria Princess Diana", an orchid named for his late mother bred at Singapore Botanic Gardens. In honor of William's visit, the "Vanda William Catherine" was named after him. A state dinner was held in William's honour by President Tony Tan at the Istana, where he gave a speech and inspected the Honour Guard.
16	13–15 September 2012	Malaysia	Kuala Lumpur, Sabah	William visited Malaysia as part of the Diamond Jubilee of Elizabeth II. The couple met with then-Prime Minister of Malaysia Najib Razak and his wife. William later visited Hospis Malaysia. He attended a state dinner hosted by then-Yang di-Pertuan Agong Abdul Halim of Kedah, before visiting As Syakirin Mosque. William viewed a cultural event and met students at KLCC Park, after which he made remarks at the British Malaysian Chamber of Commerce. He and Catherine visited Sabah, landing at Kota Kinabalu International Airport before travelling on to the Danum Valley Conservation Area.
16	16–18 September 2012	Solomon Islands	Honiara, Tavanipupu	William visited the Solomon Islands as part of the Diamond Jubilee of Elizabeth II. He was welcomed with garlands and wore traditional dress for a dinner at the residence of the Governor-General of Solomon Islands. William visited a village in Honiara. He then observed a warrior dance and was presented with traditional jewelry in Marau.
16	18–19 September 2012	Tuvalu	Funafuti	William visited Tuvalu as part of the Diamond Jubilee of Elizabeth II. Keeping with the tradition of carrying visitors who arrive by sea, he was carried on multicoloured thrones to meet the then-Prime Minister of Tuvalu, Willy Telavi. Later that day, William met students at a primary school, watched a canoe race, and participated in a traditional dancing celebration.
17	7–16 April 2014	New Zealand	Wellington, Blenheim, Auckland, Hamilton, Cambridge, Dunedin, Queenstown, Christchurch	At the invitation of the Government of New Zealand, William toured the country. (Note: William's son, George, was also present for this visit.) He met with the then-Prime Minister of New Zealand, John Key, and received a traditional Maori welcome at the Governor-General of New Zealand's residence, being greeted with a hongi. William visited the families and children at the Plunket Society and participated in a yacht race at the home of New Zealand America's Cup team. He also laid a wreath in Blenheim to mark the 100-year anniversary of World War I before touring the Omaka Aviation Heritage Centre, led by Peter Jackson.
17	16–25 April 2014	Australia	Sydney, Brisbane, Uluru, Adelaide, Canberra	At the invitation of the Government of Australia, William toured the country. He met young leaders of the arts and sports at Sydney Opera House and gave a speech there. William then attended the Royal Easter Show, before meeting survivors of bushfires in damaged areas. He visited the RAAF Base Amberley and attended a service at St Andrew's Cathedral, Sydney, marking Easter. William met indigenous artists and students in Yulara, then participating in Anzac Day commemorations at the Australian War Memorial. Then-Prime Minister of Australia Tony Abbott greeted him before his departure.
18	6 June 2014	France	Arromanches	William, along with Elizabeth II, attended the commemoration of the 70th anniversary of the Normandy Landings at Gold Beach. He gave remarks at the service and attended a tea party, meeting veterans who served in World War II.
19	4 August 2014	Belgium	Liège	William met with King Philippe and Queen Mathilde of Belgium at the Saint-Laurent Abbey, where he laid a poppy wreath at the British memorial. William attended First World War centenary commemorations at the Cointe Inter Allied Memorial, where he gave a speech. William also paid his respects at the Saint Symphorien Military Cemetery.
20	20–21 September 2014	Malta	Valletta	William represented Queen Elizabeth II at the commemoration of the 50th anniversary of Malta's independence. He met with then-Prime Minister of Malta Joseph Muscat and participated in a tree-planting ceremony with then-President of Malta Marie-Louise Coleiro Preca. William then viewed the parade at Fort Saint Elmo before viewing historical documents at National Library of Malta.
21	7–9 December 2014	United States	New York City, Washington, D.C.	William conducted a three-day tour of the East Coast of the United States. He visited the National September 11 Memorial & Museum and attended an NBA basketball game. William attended an anti-poaching hosted by the World Bank Group and gave a speech as part of his work on wildlife protection. William met Barack Obama, then President of the United States, Joe Biden, then Vice President of the United States, and Jill Biden, then Second Lady of the United States, at the White House. William then attended a black-tie fundraiser at the Metropolitan Museum of Art to benefit his alma mater, the University of St Andrews.
22	26 February – 1 March 2015	Japan	Tokyo, Fukushima, Ishinomaki, Onagawa	William undertook a four-day visit to Japan. He took part in a traditional tea ceremony at the Hama-rikyū Gardens before meeting Akihito, then Emperor of Japan, and then-Empress Michiko at the Tokyo Imperial Palace. William paid his respects and laid a wreath at the Yokohama War Cemetery, before launching a campaign for technical innovation at Academy Hills in Tokyo. He also attended a reception at the Embassy of the United Kingdom, Tokyo, meeting local politicians, artists, and sportsmen. The next day, William met with survivors and toured areas devastated by the 2011 Tōhoku earthquake and tsunami.
22	1–4 March 2015	China	Beijing, Shanghai, Xishuangbanna	William undertook a three-day visit to China, the first member of the British royal family to do so in three decades. He met with President of China and General Secretary of the Communist Party Xi Jinping at the Great Hall of the People, before touring the Forbidden City. William then launched the three-day business exhibition, the Great Festival of Creativity, promoting British innovation and business. William also attended the Chinese premiere of Paddington and visited an elephant sanctuary in Yunnan, where he gave remarks appealing to the country to consider its stance on illegal ivory trade.
23	18 May 2015	Switzerland	Gland	William, president of the United for Wildlife initiative under the Royal Foundation, visited Switzerland to attend a series of meetings discussing progress in combating trafficking of illegal wildlife products.
24	24 March 2016	Kenya	Nairobi	At the request of Elizabeth II's government, William met with then-President of Kenya Uhuru Kenyatta while visiting the area, discussing issues surrounding defence security and conservation.
25	10–13 April 2016	India	Mumbai, Delhi, Kaziranga	At the request of Elizabeth II's government, William undertook a tour of India. He met residents of Banganga Tank and visited children benefitting from multiple charities, including Childline India. William later laid a wreath at the Martyr's Memorial in honour of the victims of the 2008 Mumbai attacks. He also attended a Bollywood charity gala and paid his respects at Gandhi Smriti. William met with Prime Minister of India Narendra Modi and attended a garden party in honour of Elizabeth II's 90th birthday at the British High Commission.
25	14–16 April 2016	Bhutan	Thimphu	At the request of Elizabeth II's government, William undertook a two-day visit of country. He met with King Jigme Khesar Namgyel Wangchuck and Queen Jetsun Pema at the Tashichho Dzong on the grounds of Lingkana Palace, participating in a temple blessing. William then hiked and met with monks at Paro Taktsang and attended an evening reception for British expats.
25	16 April 2016	India	Agra	William again visited India to tour the Taj Mahal in Agra.
26	20–21 June 2016	France	Saint-Étienne	In his capacity as president of the FA, William attended the UEFA Euro 2016 football match between England and Slovakia.
27	30 June – 1 July 2016	France	Thiepval	William accompanied his father, Charles, to centenary commemorations for the Battle of the Somme at the Thiepval Memorial. William gave a poetry reading written by Sebastian Faulks.
28	23 August 2016	Germany	Düsseldorf	William visited Düsseldorf to celebrate the 70th anniversary of the formation of North Rhine-Westphalia, meeting with the then-Minister-President Hannelore Kraft.
29	24 September – 1 October 2016	Canada	British Columbia, Yukon	William realised an official tour of Canada. (Note: William's daughter, Charlotte, was also present for this visit.) He met with the then-Prime Minister of Canada, Justin Trudeau, and witnessed a First Nations traditional greeting. William laid a wreath at the Victoria Cenotaph and attended a forum for Vancouver first responders. He also visited charities working with addiction within children. William visited the Immigrant Services Society as well as the Great Bear Rainforest to mark the preservation of the indigenous forests. He visited Heiltsuk and Yukon communities. William also attended a play-day alongside Canadian military families.
30	16–17 November 2016	Vietnam	Hanoi	At the request of Elizabeth II's government, William visited the country. He attended a United for Wildlife meeting and met with the then-Prime Minister of Vietnam, Nguyễn Xuân Phúc. William held an audience with the then-Vice President of Vietnam, Đặng Thị Ngọc Thịnh, before visiting a local primary school and touring the Temple of the Jade Mountain.
31	17–18 March 2017	France	Paris	At the request of the Foreign, Commonwealth and Development Office, William undertook a two-day visit to France. He met with then-President of France François Hollande at the Élysée Palace. William attended a reception at the Embassy of the United Kingdom, Paris, where he gave a speech regarding France–United Kingdom relations. William then visited Les Invalides, meeting with veterans. He also toured the Musée d’Orsay before attending a rugby football match between France and Wales.
32	9 April 2017	France	Lille	William accompanied his father, Charles, to the centenary commemorations for the Battle of Vimy Ridge, paying tribute to the fallen soldiers.
33	7 June 2017	Belgium	Messines	William attended a British-Irish commemorative service to mark the centenary of the Battle of Messines, laying a wreath at the site.
34	17–19 July 2017	Poland	Warsaw, Gdańsk	At the request of the Foreign, Commonwealth and Development Office, William visited Poland. He met with the President of Poland, Andrzej Duda, and his wife, Agata Kornhauser-Duda, at the Presidential Palace, Warsaw. Afterward, William met with veterans at the Warsaw Rising Museum, before attending a garden party in honour of Elizabeth II's birthday. He visited the Stutthof concentration camp and met with former prisoners, paying their respects at a memorial. William later toured the European Solidarity Centre after attending a local cultural display.
34	19–21 July 2017	Germany	Berlin, Heidelberg, Hamburg	At the request of the Foreign, Commonwealth and Development Office, William visited Germany. He met with the then-Chancellor of Germany, Angela Merkel, before visiting the Brandenburg Gate. William also visited an organisation assisting disadvantaged children before meeting President of Germany Frank-Walter Steinmeier at the Bellevue Palace. William also visited small businesses in Heidelberg before touring the German Cancer Research Center to learn about stem-cell research.
35	30–31 July 2017	Belgium	Ypres	William accompanied the then-Prime Minister of the United Kingdom, Theresa May, to the commemorations for the centenary of the Battle of Passchendaele. William laid a wreath alongside King Philippe.
36	12 October 2017	Belgium	Flanders	William attended the centenary commemorations for the Battle of Passchendaele.
37	29–30 November 2017	Finland	Helsinki	William visited the country to commemorate the 100th anniversary of Finland's independence. He met the then-President of Finland, Sauli Niinistö, at the Presidential Palace, Helsinki, before delivering remarks written by Elizabeth II. The Duke delivered a speech at a reception hosted by the Ambassador of the United Kingdom to Finland, before visiting local schools and a luncheon at Helsinki City Hall.
38	30–31 January 2018	Sweden	Stockholm	At the request of the Foreign, Commonwealth and Development Office, William visited Sweden. He was accompanied on engagements by Victoria, Crown Princess of Sweden, and Prince Daniel, Duke of Västergötland, throughout the trip. William attended a reception at Fotografiska and visited an exhibition on British design before visiting Haga Palace. He visited local schools and attended meetings on mental health. The couple also met with then-Prime Minister of Sweden Stefan Löfven and his wife, Ulla Löfven, before touring the ArkDes and the Nobel Prize Museum. William also met Carl XVI Gustaf and his wife, Queen Silvia of Sweden, at the Stockholm Palace.
38	1–2 February 2018	Norway	Oslo	At the request of the Foreign, Commonwealth and Development Office, William toured Norway. He met with Haakon, Crown Prince of Norway, Mette-Marit, Crown Princess of Norway, Harald V and Queen Sonja of Norway at the Royal Palace, Oslo. A state banquet was hosted in their honour. William also visited Hartvig Nissen School and attended an event in Holmenkollen hosted by the Norwegian Ski Federation.
39	24–25 June 2018	Jordan	Amman	At the request of Elizabeth II's government, William visited Jordan. He met with Hussein, Crown Prince of Jordan, and attended an initiative of the Prince's Foundation that provides young entrepreneurs with technology. William later delivered a speech at a reception celebrating Elizabeth's birthday, hosted at the Ambassador of the United Kingdom to Jordan's residence. The Duke toured the Roman ruins of Jerash before meeting with refugees of the Syrian civil war and visiting a women's centre.
39	25–28 June 2018	Israel	Jerusalem, Tel Aviv	At the request of Elizabeth II's government, William toured Israel. He visited Yad Vashem and met with a Holocaust survivor, laying a wreath to pay respects. William met with Prime Minister of Israel Benjamin Netanyahu, as well as then-President of Israel Reuven Rivlin, before touring youth organizations and attending a football event. William later met with the President of the Palestinian National Authority Mahmoud Abbas, attending meetings about issues faced by refugees, as well as cultural events. William also visited religious sites in Jerusalem, as well as the remains of his great-grandmother Princess Alice of Battenberg at the Church of Mary Magdalene.
39	25–28 June 2018	Palestine	Ramallah	
40	8 August 2018	France	Amiens	William and then-Prime Minister of the United Kingdom Theresa May attended commemorations at Amiens Cathedral marking the centenary of the Battle of Amiens. He gave a reading during the service and laid a wreath as a mark of respect.
41	24–26 September 2018	Namibia	Windhoek	At the request of Elizabeth II's government, William undertook official engagements while visiting countries in East Africa and Southern Africa. The Namibian visit was on behalf of United for Wildlife in William's capacity as its president. He met with the then-Vice-President of Namibia, Nangolo Mbumba. William also attended a celebration of United Kingdom–Namibia relations at the British High Commission and met with mental health activists. The Tanzanian visit was also on behalf of United for Wildlife. William met with then-President of Tanzania John Magufuli to discuss wildlife trade. William also visited the Port of Dar es Salaam and toured the College of African Wildlife Management. Meanwhile, the Kenyan visit was on behalf of Elizabeth II. William visited the British Army Training Unit Kenya and met with local soccer teams.
41	26–29 September 2018	Tanzania	Dar es Salaam	
41	29–30 September 2018	Kenya	Nairobi	
42	22–23 January 2019	Switzerland	Davos	William attended the World Economic Forum in Davos. During the conference, he joined a panel about mental health services and made remarks on the issue.
43	25–26 April 2019	New Zealand	Auckland, Christchurch	William visited New Zealand in the aftermath of the Christchurch mosque shootings. He met with then-Prime Minister of New Zealand Jacinda Ardern and visited the Starship Hospital, meeting survivors before greeting emergency workers. William, alongside the then-Mayor of Christchurch, Lianne Dalziel, spoke with New Zealander Muslim religious leaders outside the Al Noor Mosque, Christchurch, alongside families of victims and delivered remarks praising the community's response to the attacks.
44	14–18 October 2019	Pakistan	Islamabad, Lahore, Chitral	At the request of the Foreign, Commonwealth and Development Office, William visited the country. The tour marked the first visit by members of the British royal family to the country in 13 years. William met with the then-Prime Minister of Pakistan Imran Khan before visiting students at the Islamabad Modern College for Girls and attending a reception at the Pakistan Monument. William met with patients at Shaukat Khanum Memorial Cancer Hospital and Research Centre and toured the Badshahi Mosque before learning about conservation at Margalla Hills National Park. He also visited the SOS Children's Villages.
45	1–3 December 2019	Kuwait	Kuwait City	At the request of the Foreign, Commonwealth and Development Office, William visited Kuwait and Oman. He visited Kuwaiti nature preserves and educational programmes before meeting with the then-Emir of Kuwait Sabah Al-Ahmad Al-Jaber Al-Sabah. William also undertook a military exercise, Desert Warrior, alongside troops to mark the 120th anniversary of the Anglo-Kuwaiti Agreement of 1899. In Oman, William discussed marine conservation with the Royal Navy of Oman, as well as local fishermen, before meeting with then-Sultan of Oman Qaboos bin Said.
45	3–5 December 2019	Oman	Musandam, Muscat	
46	3–5 March 2020	Ireland	Dublin, County Meath, County Kildare, Galway	At the request of the Foreign and Commonwealth Office, William visited Ireland. He met with the President of Ireland, Michael D. Higgins, and then-Taoiseach Leo Varadkar, before laying a wreath at the Garden of Remembrance (Dublin). William attended a reception at the Guinness Storehouse and visited youth mental health centres and social justice charities. He then showcased cultural programmes in Galway as part of their 2020 European Capital of Culture designation.
47	10–11 February 2022	United Arab Emirates	Abu Dhabi, Dubai	At the request of the Foreign and Commonwealth Office, William visited the United Arab Emirates to attend U.K. National Day at Expo 2020. He also visited the Jubail Mangrove Park in Abu Dhabi and Port of Jebel Ali in Dubai.
48	19–22 March 2022	Belize	Belize City, Hopkins, Belize Barrier Reef, Caracol, Chiquibul Forest, Cahal Pech	William visited Belize as part of the Platinum Jubilee of Elizabeth II. Upon his arrival, he was greeted by Governor-General Froyla Tzalam and later met with Prime Minister of Belize Johnny Briceño and his wife. During William's tour of Belize, he visited historic Mayan sites, explored Belize's world-famous Mayan chocolate production, and celebrated the rich culture of the Garifuna community in Hopkins. William also learned about the restoration efforts of Belize Barrier Reef being led by communities across the country. He also scuba-dived to learn more about the second-largest barrier reef in the world. A planned visit to the Akte 'il Ha cacao farm in Indian Creek Colony was scrapped due to local protests by residents over lack of consultation about the local football pitch earmarked for William's helicopter landing, as well as the residents' ongoing dispute over land with Fauna and Flora International, of which William is a patron. At a reception by the governor-general at Cahal Pech, William emphasised safeguarding democracy and added that he stood in solidarity with Ukraine amid the 2022 Russian invasion of Ukraine.
48	22–24 March 2022	Jamaica	Kingston, Trench Town, Spanish Town, Montego Bay	William visited Jamaica as part of the Platinum Jubilee of Elizabeth II. They met the Governor-General Patrick Allen and his wife at King's House. William was later received by the Prime Minister of Jamaica, Andrew Holness, and his wife, who stated during a joint meeting that his nation was "moving on and we intend to attain in short order our development goals and fulfil our true ambitions and destiny as an independent, developed, prosperous country". William joined young football players in Trenchtown, and celebrated the legacy of Bob Marley and other Jamaican musicians. At the Shortwood Teachers' College, William met students training to become early childhood education practitioners. At Spanish Town Hospital, he met frontline workers. William later interacted with members of the Jamaica Defence Force at Flankers, near Montego Bay. A demonstration by the Advocates Network, a human rights coalition of Jamaican activists and equalities organisations, took place near the British High Commission in Kingston to ask for an apology and compensation from The Crown for chattel slavery. The coalition also penned an open letter signed by 100 Jamaican figures to demand an apology in order "to begin a process of healing, forgiveness, reconciliation and compensation". In a speech delivered at the dinner hosted by the Governor-General, William expressed his "profound sorrow" over slavery, adding that it "should never have happened" and "forever stains our history". On his final day in Jamaica, William attended the inaugural Commissioning Parade for service personnel from across the Caribbean who had recently completed the Caribbean Military Academy's Officer Training Programme.
48	24–26 March 2022	The Bahamas	Nassau, Great Abaco, Grand Bahama	William visited The Bahamas as part of the Platinum Jubilee of Elizabeth II. After his arrival, he was greeted by then-Governor-General Cornelius A. Smith. William later had a meeting with the Prime Minister of the Bahamas, Philip Davis, and his wife. Rastafarian groups planned a protest to ask for reparations from the United Kingdom for slavery, while the Bahamas National Reparations Committee penned an open letter regarding the issue. During William's visit, he spent time with communities across the Bahamas and attended both a junkanoo parade and The Bahamas Platinum Jubilee Sailing Regatta. In a speech given at the reception hosted by the Governor-General, William assured Belize, Jamaica and the Bahamas that the monarchy would "support with pride and respect your decisions about your future. Relationships evolve. Friendship endures". He reiterated these sentiments in a statement released at the end of the tour, saying, "I know that this tour has brought into even sharper focus questions about the past and the future. In Belize, Jamaica and The Bahamas, that future is for the people to decide upon".
49	16 May 2022	United Arab Emirates	Abu Dhabi	William travelled to the United Arab Emirates to meet President Mohamed bin Zayed Al Nahyan and offer condolences on behalf of Elizabeth II for the death of the latter's predecessor Khalifa bin Zayed Al Nahyan.
50	30 November – 2 December 2022	United States	Boston	William visited Boston to attend the second Earthshot Prize awards ceremony on 2 December. Upon his arrival, he was received by the then-Governor of Massachusetts, Charlie Baker. Later on, William met Boston mayor Michelle Wu and then-governor-elect of Massachusetts Maura Healey at Boston City Hall. He also visited local environmental, educational and community projects. William toured the John F. Kennedy Presidential Library and Museum alongside Caroline Kennedy. He also met with then-President Joe Biden on the final day of his visit.
51	22–23 March 2023	Poland	Rzeszów, Warsaw	William visited Rzeszów to meet with Polish and British troops on 22 March. The following day, he paid his respects to the country's fallen ones at the Tomb of the Unknown Soldier and had talks with the President of Poland Andrzej Duda at the Presidential Palace, Warsaw, taking the opportunity to "reiterate the profound relationship shared by our two nations and underline my continued support and gratitude to the Polish people". William then headed to a food hall in downtown Warsaw, where he saw how young refugees who arrived in Poland soon after the Russian invasion of Ukraine were being supported and had settled in the country.
52	1 June 2023	Jordan	Amman	William travelled to Jordan to attend the wedding of Hussein, Crown Prince of Jordan, and Rajwa Al Saif. Later that evening, he attended a banquet in celebration of the wedding.
53	10 September 2023	France	Bordeaux	William, as patron of the Welsh Rugby Union, attended the 2023 Rugby World Cup Group Stage match between Wales and Fiji.
54	18–19 September 2023	United States	New York City	William travelled to New York City to attend the second Earthshot Prize Innovation Summit, where the fifteen finalists of the 2023 Earthshot Prize were unveiled. William first visited the Billion Oyster Project, a nonprofit working to restore oyster reefs to New York Harbor through public education initiatives. He also interacted with children from Harbor Middle School and later met the Secretary-General of the United Nations, António Guterres, during a United Nations General Assembly session. William also visited a New York City Fire Department firehouse to hear about their experiences working in the city and discuss the importance of prioritizing their mental health.
55	14–15 October 2023	France	Marseille	William, as patron of the Welsh Rugby Union, attended the 2023 Rugby World Cup Quarter Final match between Wales and Argentina.
56	5–8 November 2023	Singapore	Singapore	William travelled to Singapore to attend the third Earthshot Prize awards ceremony on 7 November. He arrived at the Jewel Changi Airport on 5 November and his first stop was at the Jewel, a nature-themed entertainment and retail complex linked to one of the airport's passenger terminals, which also houses the world's tallest indoor waterfall, the HSBC Rain Vortex, surrounded by terraced gardens and trees. William then took part in a dragon boating race on the Kallang River on 6 November. He also attended the United for Wildlife Global Summit later on the same day, which took place for the first time outside the United Kingdom. William rounded off his trip by taking a hike at the Tree Top Walk with then-Deputy Prime Minister of Singapore Lawrence Wong on 8 November, where William also spoke to volunteers. William then headed to the Centre for Wildlife Forensics, a special laboratory linked to the international effort to monitor the DNA of illegal wildlife products.
57	18 December 2023	Kuwait	Kuwait City	William, accompanied by the then-Foreign Secretary of the United Kingdom, David Cameron, travelled to the country to meet Mishal Al-Ahmad Al-Jaber Al-Sabah and offer condolences on behalf of Charles III for the death of the latter's predecessor Nawaf Al-Ahmad Al-Jaber Al-Sabah.
58	6 June 2024	France	Normandy	William attended the Canadian commemorative event at the Juno Beach Centre in Courseulles-sur-Mer, organised by the Government of Canada. He also participated in the international ceremony at Omaha Beach, Saint Laurent sur Mer, alongside more than 25 heads of state and veterans from various countries, to mark the 80th anniversary of the Normandy landings.
59	20 June 2024	Germany	Frankfurt	William attended the UEFA Euro 2024 group stage match between England and Denmark at the Waldstadion (Frankfurt).
60	6 July 2024	Germany	Düsseldorf	William attended the UEFA Euro 2024 quarter-final match between England and Switzerland at the Merkur Spiel-Arena.
61	14 July 2024	Germany	Berlin	William attended the UEFA Euro 2024 final match between Spain and England at the Olympiastadion.
62	4–7 November 2024	South Africa	Cape Town	William travelled to Cape Town to attend the fourth Earthshot Prize awards ceremony on 6 November. Upon arrival, his first engagement was meeting with young environmentalists as part of the prize's inaugural Climate Leaders Youth Program. Later, William also met with young South Africans from three townships with whom he played rugby. The following day, William embarked on a hike with the conservationist Robert Irwin. During the visit, William also spoke with the local experts regarding their critical work to protect the region's flora and fauna. He also had an audience with President of South Africa Cyril Ramaphosa at the latter's official residence. Later that day, William also announced a five-year financial package that will provide rangers across Africa with subsidised health and life insurance. He also met with the fifteen finalists of the 2024 Earthshot Prize ahead of the awards ceremony on 6 November for a walk through Kirstenbosch National Botanical Garden. The Prince also visited Simon's Town on 7 November and met with volunteers working for the National Sea Rescue Institute. Later that day, William also visited the Kalk Bay Harbour to highlight the contributions of former Earthshot Prize finalist Abalobi.
63	7 December 2024	France	Paris	William attended the reopening of Notre-Dame de Paris upon receiving an invitation from the French president Emmanuel Macron. William also met then-First Lady of the United States Jill Biden and then-President-elect of the United States Donald Trump at the ceremony. William and Trump later held a private meeting to discuss United Kingdom–United States relations.
64	20–21 March 2025	Estonia	Tallinn, Tapa	William met with the President of Estonia, Alar Karis, and carried out engagements in Tallinn. In William's capacity as colonel-in-chief of the Mercian Regiment, he also visited British troops taking part in Operation CABRIT.
65	26 April 2025	Vatican City	St. Peter's Square	William travelled to Vatican City to attend the funeral of Pope Francis on behalf of Charles III.
66	8 June 2025	Monaco	Monaco City	William travelled to Monaco to attend the Blue Economy and Finance Forum.
67	9 July 2025	Switzerland	Zurich	William attended the UEFA Women's Euro 2025 group stage match between England and the Netherlands at Letzigrund.
68	27 July 2025	Switzerland	Basel	William attended the UEFA Women's Euro 2025 final match between England and Spain at St. Jakob-Park.
69	3–7 November 2025	Brazil	Rio de Janeiro, Belém	William travelled to Rio de Janeiro to attend the fifth Earthshot Prize awards ceremony on 5 November. Upon arrival in Rio de Janeiro, he received the keys to the city from Mayor Eduardo Paes at Sugarloaf Mountain. William then attended a session alongside the footballer Cafu and met young leaders at Maracanã Stadium. He also took part in a volleyball game on Copacabana Beach. On 4 November, he visited Paquetá Island and also attended a United for Wildlife meeting in Rio, where he announced a new partnership to protect Indigenous people in the Amazon rainforest. William also met with the 2025 Earthshot Prize finalists at Christ the Redeemer on the morning of 5 November. William also attended the 2025 United Nations Climate Change Conference in Belém on 6 November, where he spoke with Albert II, Prince of Monaco and held meetings with President Luiz Inácio Lula da Silva of Brazil and King Carl XVI Gustaf of Sweden and his wife, Queen Silvia. William visited Museu Paraense Emílio Goeldi in Belém and met Indigenous leaders from different areas on 7 November, the last day of his visit.
70	9–11 February 2026	Saudi Arabia	At-Turaif District, Riyadh, Al-Ula	William visited Saudi Arabia at the request of the British government. On 9 February, he visited the At-Turaif District, held a meeting with Crown Prince Mohammed bin Salman, and attended an official dinner. William visited Misk Sports City in Riyadh on 10 February, where he met with young footballers. He later visited the Sports Boulevard, a major recreational and pedestrian development in Riyadh, and met local residents.
71	9 September 2026	Norway	Oslo	William attended the funeral of Harald V.
72	16–18 November 2026	India	Mumbai, New Delhi	William travelled to Mumbai to attend the sixth Earthshot Prize awards ceremony on 17 November. The couple took part in multiple engagements across the city, including cricket, travelling on the Mumbai Metro, and meeting with Bollywood actors. William and Catherine also attended the Earthshot Impact assembly. The couple attended the inaugural Children's Earthshot on 17 November to recognise environmental innovators aged 9 to 17. They also met Narendra Modi, the Prime Minister of India, on 18 November in New Delhi.

== See also ==
- Foreign relations of the United Kingdom
- Soft power of the United Kingdom
- List of official overseas trips made by Charles III
- List of state visits made by Elizabeth II
- List of Commonwealth official trips made by Elizabeth II
- List of official overseas trips made by Catherine, Princess of Wales

== Footnotes ==
=== References ===
- "The Prince of Wales". The Royal Family. The Royal Household. n.d. Biography.
- "His Royal Highness The Prince of Wales". Government of Canada. n.d.
