= Jigme Namgyel Wangchuck =

Heir apparent to the Bhutanese throne (born 2016)

- Crown Prince of Bhutan
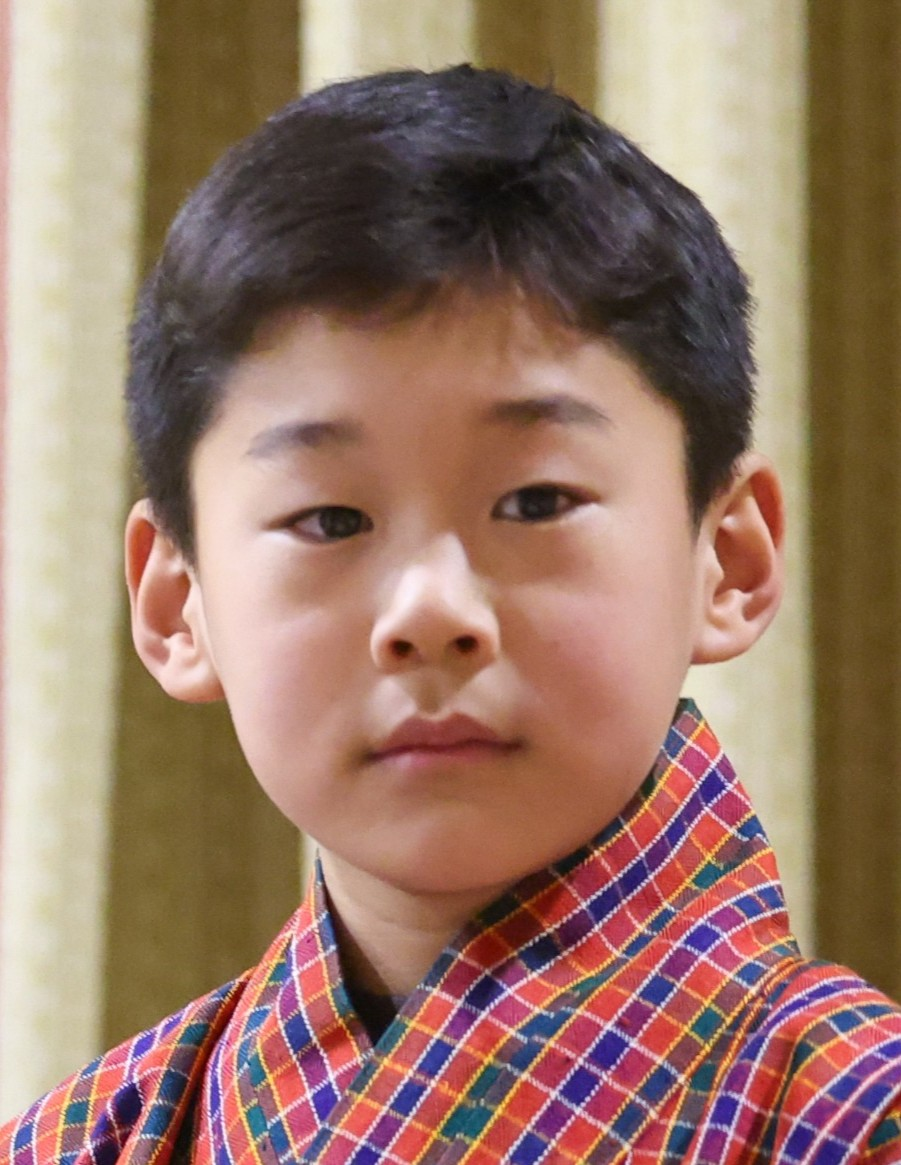
- Wangchuck in 2024
- Born: 5 February 2016 (age 10); Lingkana Palace, Thimphu, Bhutan
- House: Wangchuck
- Father: Jigme Khesar Namgyel Wangchuck
- Mother: Jetsun Pema
- Religion: Buddhism

Jigme Namgyel Wangchuck (Dzongkha: འཇིགས་མེད་རྣམ་རྒྱལ་དབང་ཕྱུག་, Wylie: jigs med rnam rgyal dbang phyug; born 5 February 2016) is the heir apparent to the Bhutanese throne. He is the first child of King Jigme Khesar Namgyel Wangchuck and Queen Jetsun Pema.

== Biography ==
His name was announced on 16 April 2016. Prior to the announcement, he was known only as The Gyalsey, which means "prince". Before his birth, his paternal uncle Prince Jigyel Ugyen of Bhutan was the heir presumptive to the throne. In honor of his birth, 108,000 trees were planted by thousands of volunteers in Bhutan. In 2017, in honor of his first birthday, a new damselfly species was named after the crown prince, Megalestes gyalsey. He is expected to become the sixth Druk Gyalpo (King of Bhutan). He has a younger brother, Prince Dasho Jigme Ugyen Wangchuck, and a younger sister, Princess Ashi Sonam Yangden Wangchuck. He is currently the second-youngest heir apparent in the world, only behind Prince Charles of Luxembourg.

== HRH Gyalsey Math Award ==
The HRH Gyalsey Annual Mathematics Award, a joint initiative by the Ministry of Education and Skills Development and the Druk Gyalpo’s Institute, was instituted in 2022 to promote mathematics in the education system and also to foster and nurture students' natural aptitude in mathematics. This award offers a platform for students to demonstrate their mathematical skills, with a specific focus on number sense and competence in inductive and deductive reasoning.

The HRH Gyalsey Annual Mathematics Award is a national-level test for the students at two levels: Middle Secondary School (classes IX & X) and Higher Secondary School (classes XI & XII).

The HRH Gyalsey Math Award is awarded annually on the birthday of the Gyalsey Jigme Namgyel Wangchuck.

== See also ==
- House of Wangchuck
- Line of succession to the Bhutanese throne
- List of current heirs apparent

Jigme Namgyel Wangchuck House of Wangchuck Born: 5 February 2016
Regnal titles
Lines of succession
First Heir apparent	Line of succession to the Bhutanese throne 1st position	Succeeded by Jigme Ugyen Wangchuck
