= Tavanipupu =

Island in Solomon Islands

Coordinates: 9.826°S 160.850°E

Tavanipupu is an island in the Solomon Islands. It is located in Marau Sound, at the eastern end of Guadalcanal, between Towara'o Island and Marapa Island, and is part of Guadalcanal Province.

In 1896, a large and profitable trading station was established on Tavanipupu, then called Crawford Island. It is now the site of the Tavanipupu Island Resort, which was visited by the Duke and Duchess of Cambridge in 2012.
