= Jetsun Pema =

Queen of Bhutan since 2011

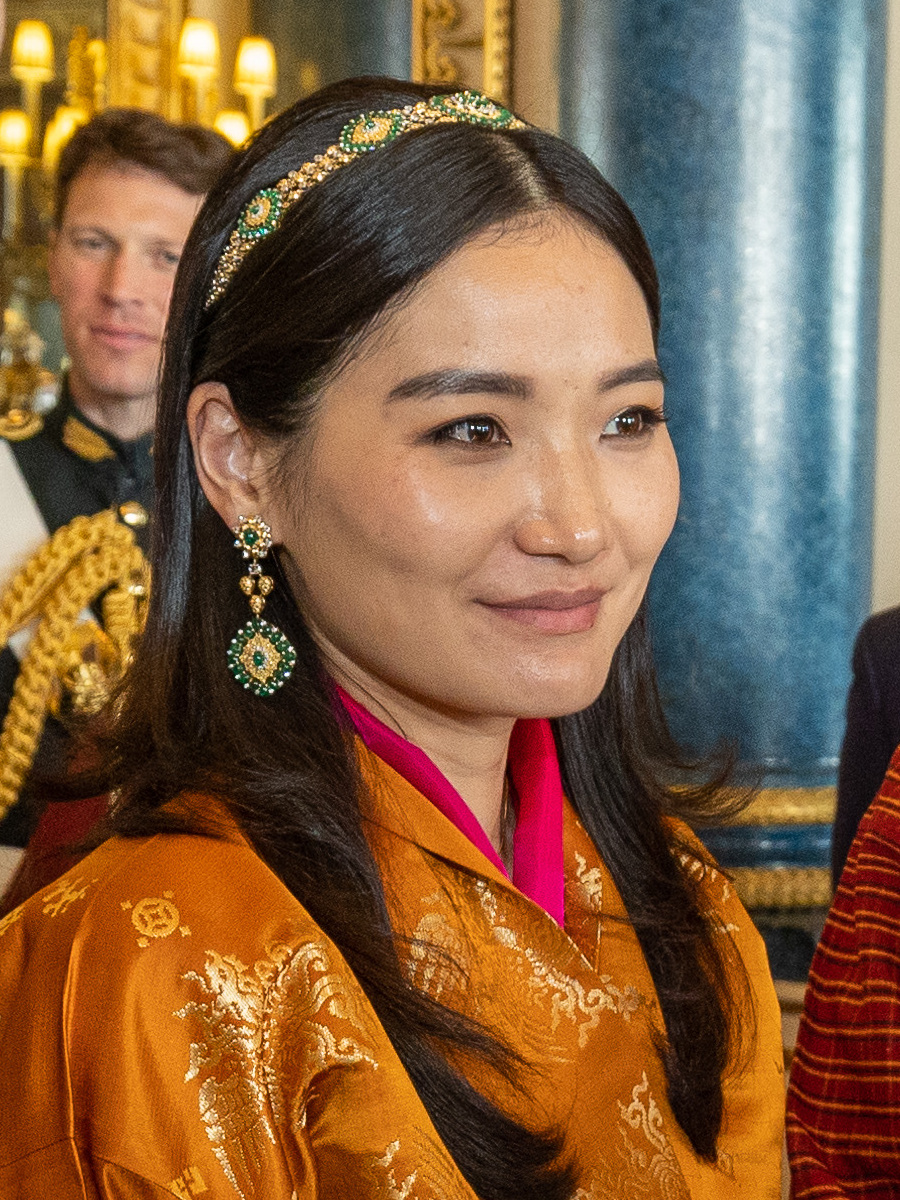
- Jetsun Pema in 2023

Queen consort of Bhutan
- Tenure: 13 October 2011 – present
- Coronation: 13 October 2011
- Born: 4 June 1990 (age 36); Thimphu, Bhutan
- Spouse: Jigme Khesar Namgyel Wangchuck (m. 2011)
- Issue: Jigme Namgyel Wangchuck; Jigme Ugyen Wangchuck; Sonam Yangden Wangchuck
Names
- Jetsun Pema Wangchuck (Note: Women in Bhutan retain their names upon marriage.)
- Dynasty: Wangchuck (by marriage)
- Father: Dhondup Gyaltshen
- Mother: Sonam Choki
- Religion: Drukpa Kagyu

Jetsun Pema (Dzongkha: རྗེ་བཙུན་པདྨ་; Wylie: rje btsun padma, born on 4 June 1990) is Queen of Bhutan as the wife of King Jigme Khesar Namgyel Wangchuck since their marriage on 13 October 2011. She is currently the youngest queen consort in the world. She and the King have three children: Crown Prince Jigme Namgyel Wangchuck, the heir apparent to the Bhutanese throne; Prince Jigme Ugyen Wangchuck; and Princess Sonam Yangden Wangchuck.

== Early life and education ==
Jetsun Pema was born at Jigme Dorji Wangchuck National Referral Hospital in Thimphu on 4 June 1990. Her father, Dhondup Gyaltshen, is the grandson of two Trashigang Dzongpons, Thinley Topgay and Ugyen Tshering (governors of Trashigang) who were originally from Kurtoe Bhutan. Her mother, Aum Sonam Choki, comes from the family of Bumthang Pangtey, one of Bhutan's oldest noble families. Sonam Choki's father was a half-brother of two queens consort of Bhutan, Phuntsho Choden (great-grandmother of the present king) and her sister Pema Dechen.

Her ancestor is also the 48th Druk Desi and 10th Penlop of Trongsa Jigme Namgyal (father of King Ugyen Wangchuck and of her great-great-grandmother, Ashi Yeshay Choden).

Jetsun Pema is the second of five children. Her siblings are two brothers, Jigme Namgyel and Dasho Thinley Norbu (the eldest, who is the husband of the king's half-sister, Princess Ashi Euphelma Choden Wangchuck), and two sisters, Serchen Doma and Ashi Yeatso Lhamo (the eldest, who is married to the king's brother, Prince Gyaltshab Jigme Dorji Wangchuck).

Jetsun Pema's early education took place in Thimphu at the Little Dragon School, the Sunshine School (1995–96) and finally the Changangkha Lower Secondary School (1997–98). She then received a convent education at St. Joseph's Convent in Kalimpong, West Bengal, India, in 1999–2000. She pursued her secondary education at the Lungtenzampa Middle Secondary School in Thimphu from 2001 to 2005 and moved to The Lawrence School, Sanawar, in Solan, Himachal Pradesh, India, in April 2006. She joined Lawrence as a Class-XI student and studied English, history, geography, economics, and painting. She completed her Higher Secondary education on 31 March 2008. She then began her tertiary education at Regent's University London, where she graduated with a degree in international relations, with psychology and art history as minor subjects.

== Marriage and family ==
=== Royal wedding ===
On 20 May 2011, during the opening of the Parliament's seventh session, the king announced their engagement, saying

"As King, it is now time for me to marry. After much thought I have decided that the wedding shall be later this year."

Describing Jetsun Pema, he said

"Now, many will have their own idea of what a Queen should be like—that she should be uniquely beautiful, intelligent and graceful. I think with experience and time, one can grow into a dynamic person in any walk of life with the right effort. For the Queen, what is most important is that at all times, as an individual she must be a good human being, and as Queen, she must be unwavering in her commitment to serve the People and Country. As my queen, I have found such a person and her name is Jetsun Pema. While she is young, she is warm and kind in heart and character. These qualities together with the wisdom that will come with age and experience will make her a great servant to the nation."

The couple got married on 13 October 2011, at Punakha Dzong. The ceremony was held in Punakha, followed by a public celebration in Thimphu and Paro. During the ceremony, the King bestowed the Crown of the Druk Gyaltsuen on her, formally proclaiming her the Queen of the Kingdom of Bhutan.

The wedding was held in traditional style with the "blessings of the guardian deities." Although Bhutan allows polygamy, the king said that he would never marry another woman. For their wedding, the Netherlands sent the royal couple tulips and named one "Queen of Bhutan" after her.

=== Personal interests ===
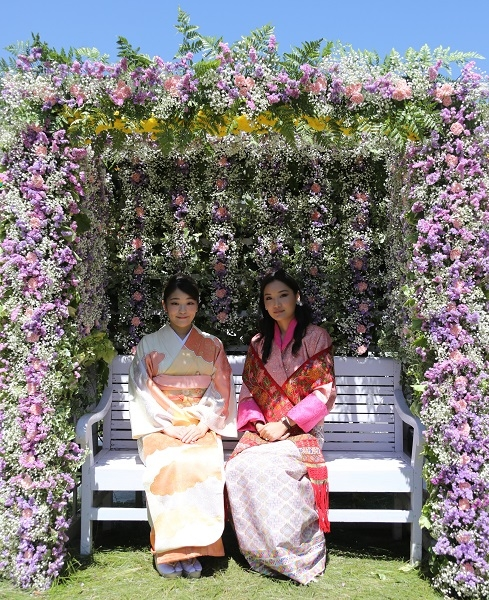
The Queen with former Princess Mako of Japan at the inauguration of the 3rd Royal Bhutan Flower Exhibition in 2017

The Queen's interests include fine arts, painting, and basketball. She captained her school team in basketball games and maintains an interest in the sport. Her other diversions during her school days included participation in school bands and dance programs. Besides Dzongkha, the national language of Bhutan, she is fluent in English and Hindi.

=== Children ===
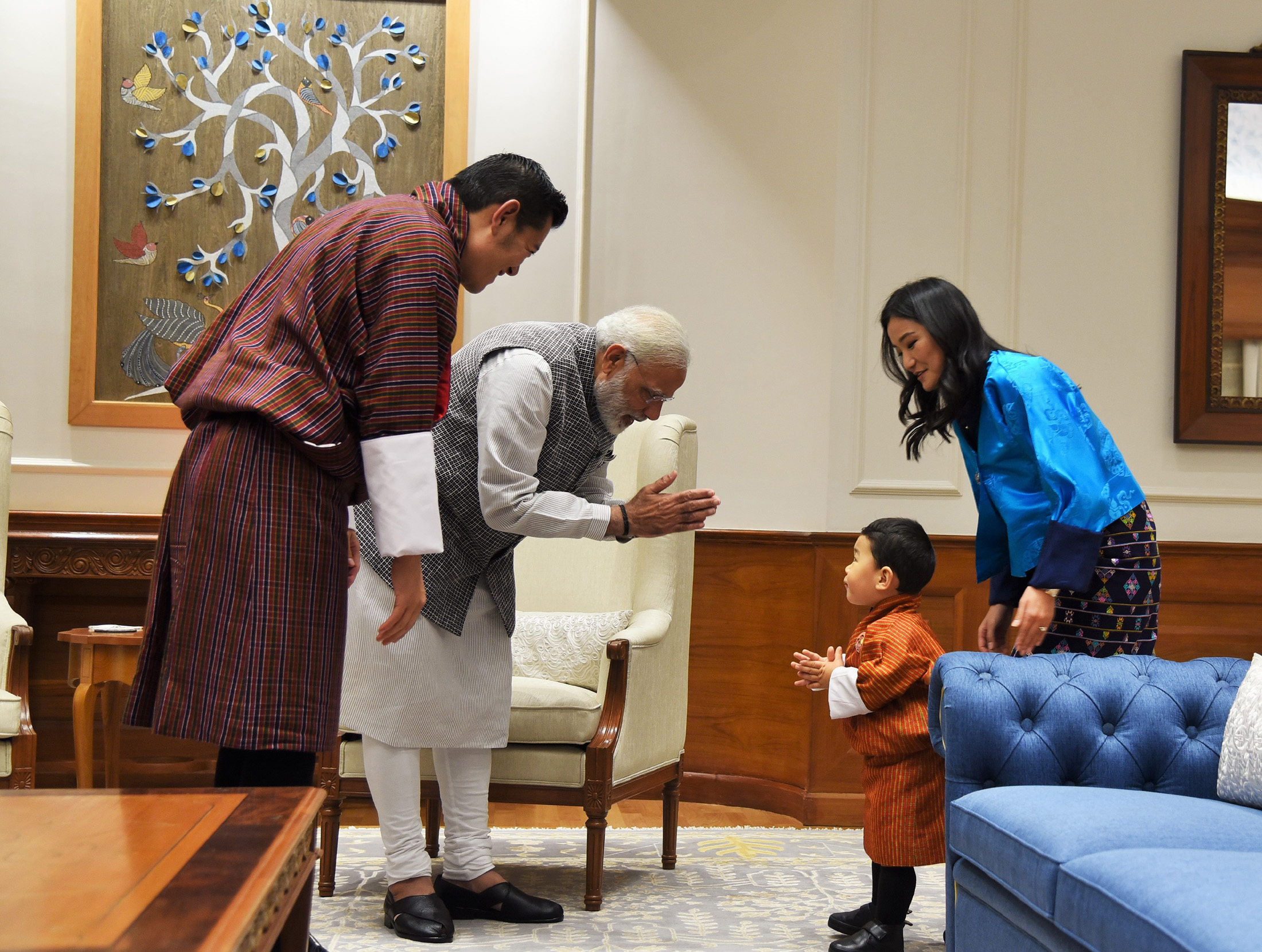
The Druk Gyalsey with the King and Queen meeting Narendra Modi in New Delhi

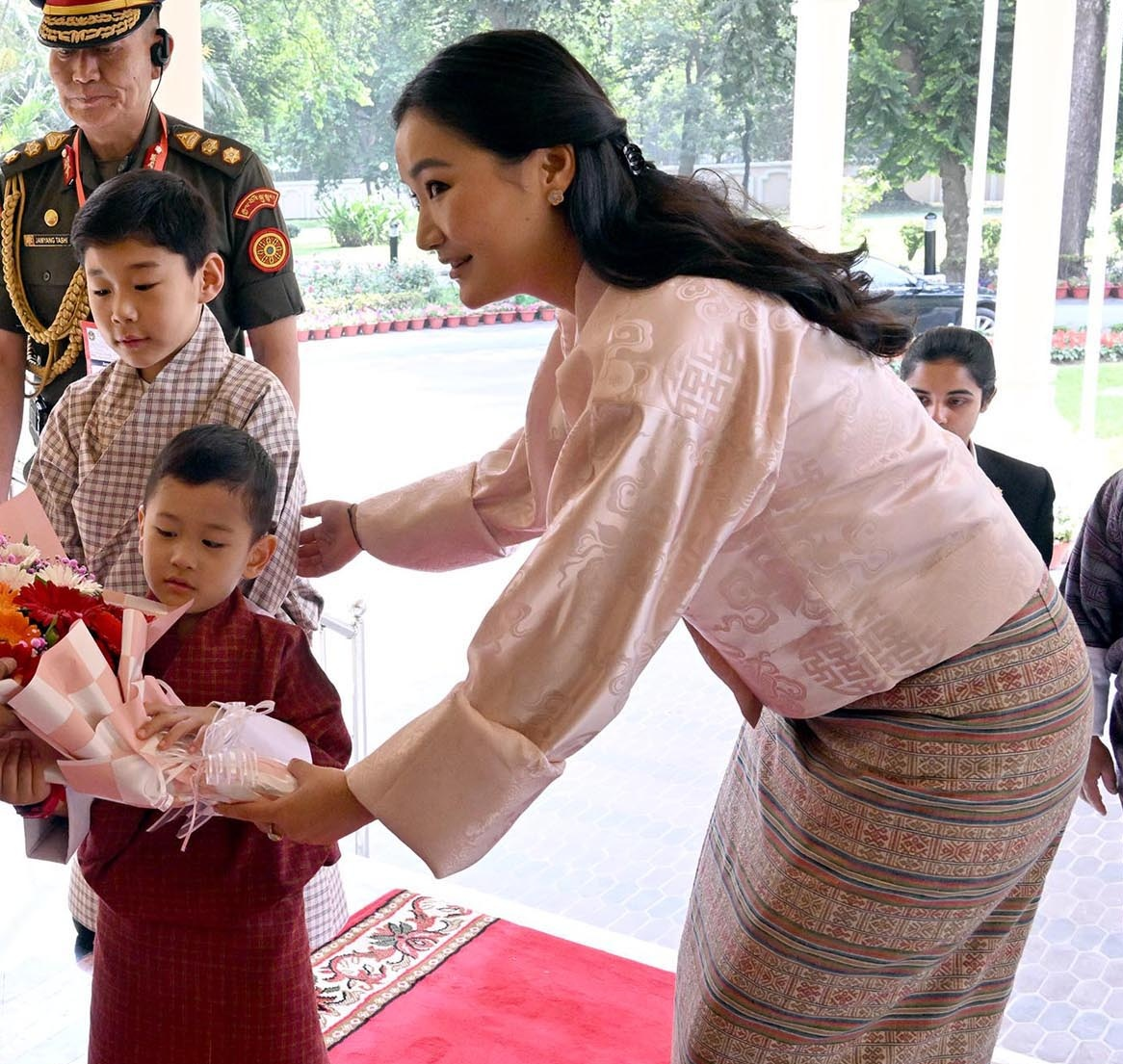
Queen Jetsun Pema and her children in Dhaka in 2024

Jetsun Pema gave birth to her first child on 5 February 2016 at the Lingkana Palace. The King was present for the birth of the prince, known by the title Gyalsey. The baby's name, Jigme Namgyel Wangchuck, was announced on 16 April 2016. On 19 March 2020, the King and Queen's official Instagram accounts reported that she had given birth to her second son in Lingkana Palace in Thimphu.

On 30 June 2020, the Royal Family announced that the second Gyalsey had been named Jigme Ugyen Wangchuck. On 9 September 2023, the King announced that the Queen had delivered their third child and only daughter at the Lingkana Palace. The baby's name, Sonam Yangden Wangchuck, was announced on 9 December 2023.

== Royal duties ==
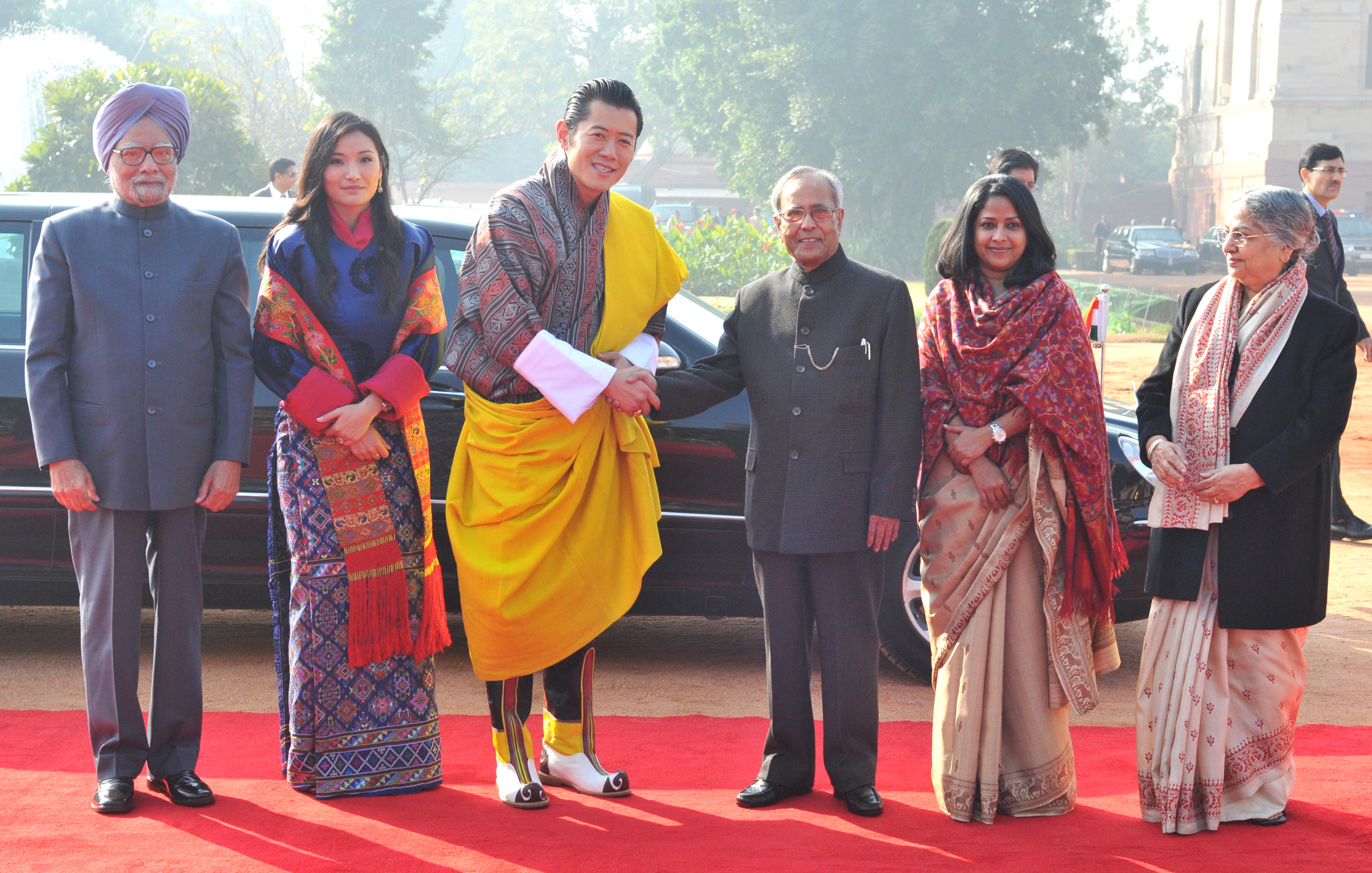
The King and Queen being received by the President of India at Rashtrapati Bhavan, in New Delhi in 2013.

Following her marriage to the King, Jetsun Pema has joined him on several visits abroad to India, Singapore, Japan and the United Kingdom.

Jetsun Pema accompanied Jigme Khesar on several of his royal visits to various parts of Bhutan before their wedding, and as Queen of Bhutan, accompanies him on all such visits. The royal visits on road through the country involve meeting and interacting with as many local people, students and public servants as possible.

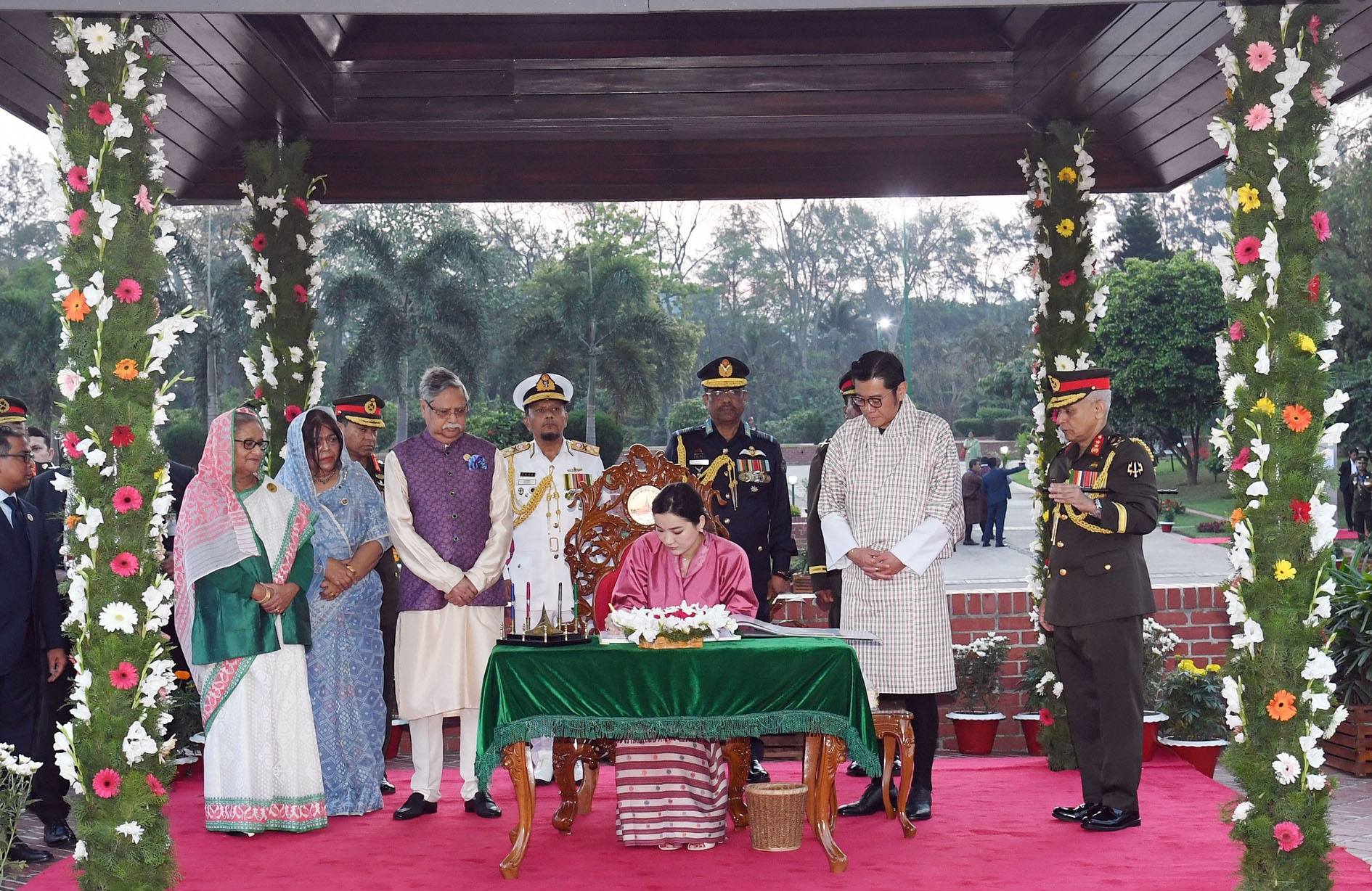
Queen Jetsun Pema Wangchuck Bhutan Visits Savar Mausoleum

Jetsun Pema is an advocate of environmental issues, and the Patron of the Royal Society for Protection of Nature (RSPN). She is also the UNEP Ozone Ambassador. She works closely with various organisations working with children with special needs as the patron of Ability Bhutan Society. She is the Patron of the Bhutan Kidney Association (Jigten Wangchuck Tshogpa) and the Bhutan Kidney Foundation. Since 2016 she has been the President of the Bhutan Red Cross Society (BRCS).

== Notes ==
Jetsun Pema House of Wangchuck Born: 4 June 1990
Bhutanese royalty
Preceded by Dorji Wangmo; Tshering Pem; Tshering Yangdon; Sangay Choden	Queen consort of Bhutan; 2011–present	Incumbent
