= The Bahamas Platinum Jubilee Sailing Regatta =

Sailing Regatta

- Date: 25 March 2022
- Location: Montague Harbour, East Bay Street, Nassau, The Bahamas
- Theme: Platinum Jubilee of Elizabeth II
- Organised by: Royal Nassau Sailing Club

The Bahamas Platinum Jubilee Sailing Regatta was held on 25 March 2022 as part of the Bahamian celebrations of the Platinum Jubilee of Queen Elizabeth II.

The event, organised by the Royal Nassau Sailing Club, was attended by the Duke and Duchess of Cambridge.

== Description ==
External videos
- The Royal Visit 2022 | Her Majesty’s Platinum Jubilee Regatta Source: The Office of the Prime Minister The Bahamas.

The Platinum Jubilee Regatta was held on 25 March 2022 in the waters off Montagu Beach. The race consisted of five 21 ft Class B boats, with the Duke and Duchess of Cambridge competing against each other. It rained during the entire race. It was the first regatta in the Bahamas since the start of the COVID-19 pandemic two years ago.

Due to downpours, the visibility around waters had been down to 150 ft at one point, which delayed the start of the race.

The Duchess's boat, Ants Nest II, had suffered a technical problem at the start, that lost their time at the start. "They had to drop the sail down, which cost them a good 50 metres at the start of the race", Jimmie Lowe, director of sailing at the Bahamas Sailing Association, said.

The race involved sailing around a three and a half mile course off Montagu Beach in Nassau. The Duke steered his boat, Susan Chase, around the three-and-a-half mile course after being handed control of the tiller once his boat had rounded the first point. The Duke's team won the race, while the Duchess's came last.

== See also ==
- Thames Diamond Jubilee Pageant
- Gibraltar Diamond Jubilee Flotilla
