= Lingkana Palace =

Royal palace in Thimpu, Bhutan

Lingkana Palace is the residence of King Jigme Khesar Namgyel Wangchuck of Bhutan. The palace grounds are adjacent to the Tashichho Dzong in the capital city of Thimphu.

It was here that the Queen consort Jetsun Pema gave birth to a son on 5 February 2016, Jigme Namgyel Wangchuck. On 19 March 2020, Queen Jetsun Pema gave birth to her second son, Jigme Ugyen Wangchuck, also in this palace. On 9 September 2023, the King announced that the Queen had delivered their third child and only daughter at this palace, Sonam Yangden Wangchuck.
