= Hopkins, Belize =

Hopkins
- Village
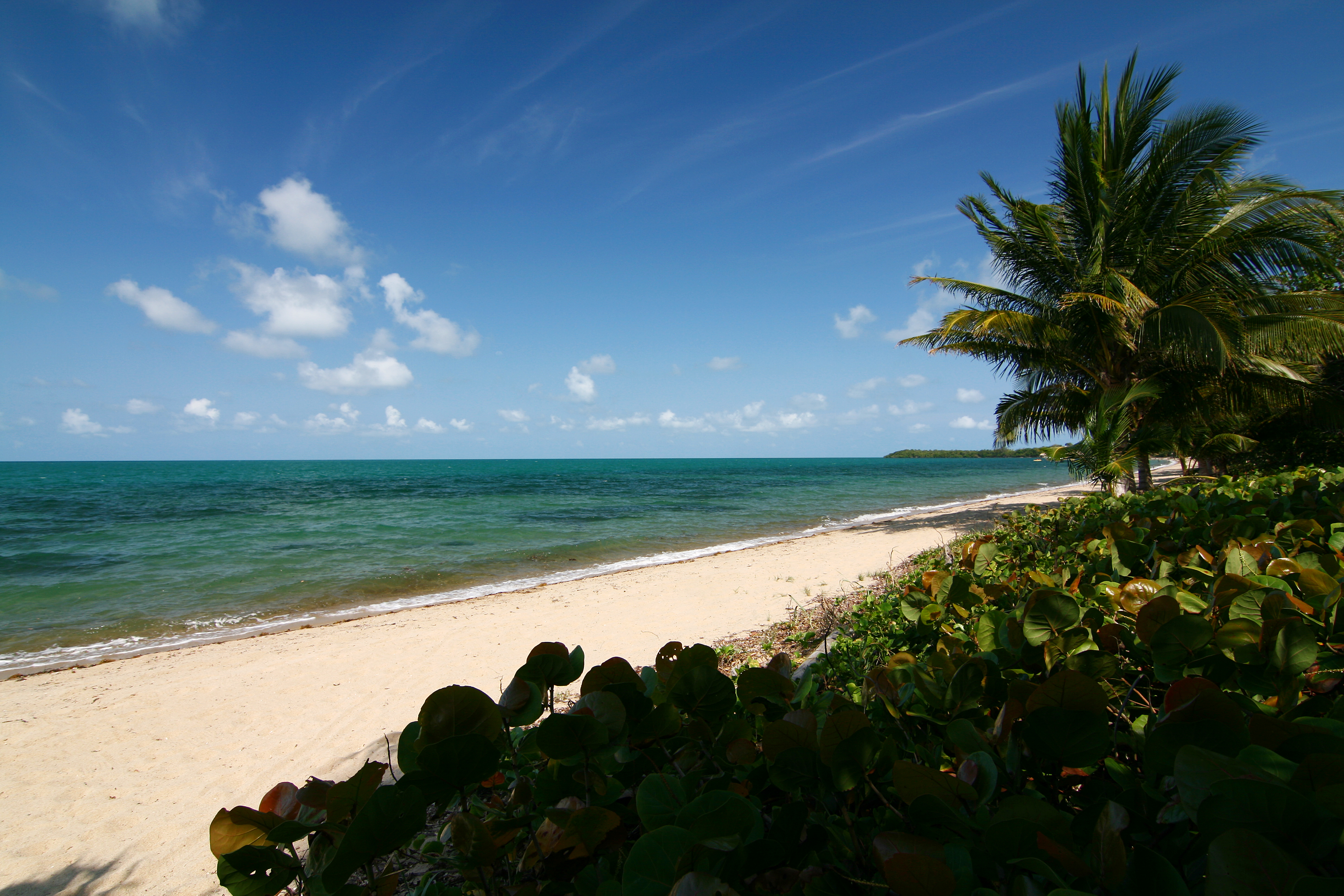
- Hopkins Beach, Stann Creek, Belize

- Location within Belize
- Coordinates: 16°52′N 88°17′W
- Country: Belize
- District: Stann Creek District
- Time zone: UTC-6 (Central)
- Climate: Af

Hopkins is a coastal village in eastern Belize.

== Demographics ==
At the time of the 2010 census, Hopkins had a population of 1,610. Of these, 70.2% were Garifuna, 9.9% Mixed, 6.0% Creole, 3.8% Mestizo, 3.2% Mopan Maya, 2.2% Caucasian, 1.4% Asian, 1.3% Ketchi Maya, 0.5% African, 0.3% East Indian, 0.1% Mennonite and 0.9% others.

== Geography ==
The village is separated into two parts; the Northside (Baila) and the Southside (False Sittee). Hopkins is surrounded by the Maya Mountains and the Cockscomb Range inland, and the Caribbean Sea on its shore. It is also very close to the Sittee River. The village was created in 1942 to replace the village of Newtown, which was devastated by a hurricane further up the coast.
