= British Columbia Legislature Cenotaph =

Memorial in Victoria, British Columbia

Coordinates: 48.420513°N 123.369313°W

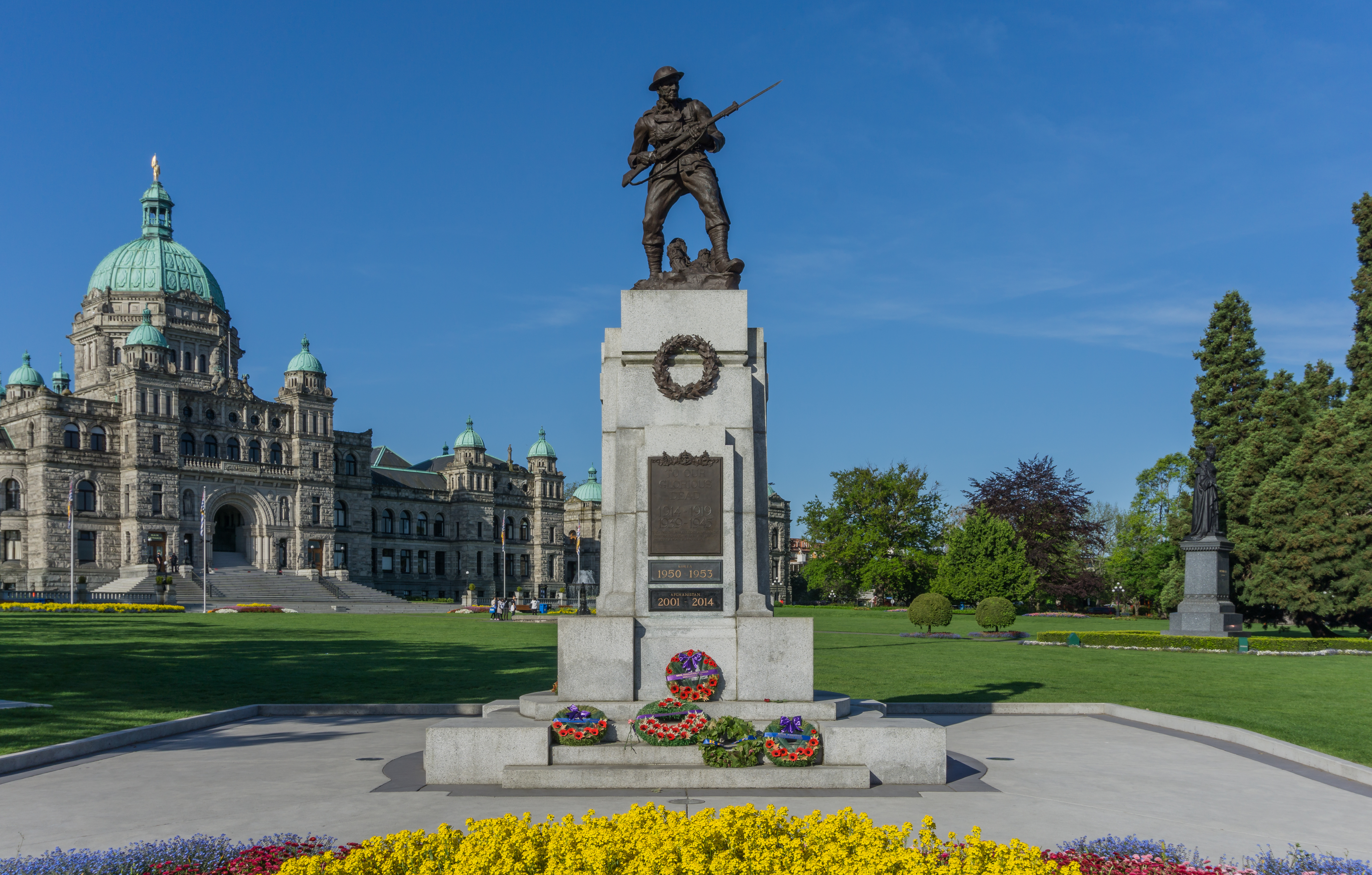
- The cenotaph in 2018
- Interactive map of British Columbia Legislature Cenotaph
- Location: Victoria, British Columbia, Canada

The British Columbia Legislature Cenotaph, also known as the Victoria Cenotaph and the War Memorial to the Unknown Soldier, is a war memorial, installed outside the British Columbia Parliament Buildings in Victoria, British Columbia, Canada. Unveiled by Lt.-Gov. W.C. Nichol on July 12, 1925, the granite cenotaph commemorates the sacrifices of Canadian Forces personnel and citizens during both World Wars, the Korean War and peace operations since 1947. The bronze statue was designed by sculptors Vernon and Sidney March.
