= Khuruthang Middle Secondary School =

Location
- Khuruthang, Punakha District; Bhutan
- Coordinates: 27.554131°N 89.872633°E

Information
- Established: 16 November 1996

Khuruthang Middle Secondary School is a co-educational UNESCO Associated School near Khuruthang, a town 4 km south of Punakha Dzong in the Punakha District of Bhutan. It was founded in 1996, and by 2015 it had become the largest school in Punakha district, with 1109 students.

== Site ==
The school is located on the top of a spur, about 200 m north of Khuruthang town. The site is next to the Punakha–Thimphu Highway and overlooks the Puna Tsang Chu river. Before the school was built, the dry ground of the spur was covered with cactus foliage around the remains of derelict houses.

== History ==
Building work started in 1994, sponsored by the World Bank under the Primary Education Project, creating a campus with over a dozen buildings connected by concrete footpaths. These include sixteen classrooms in the four academic blocks, a library/laboratory building, multipurpose hall and an administrative block. The school caters for boarders, with two hostels for girls and one for boys, as well as accommodation for the principal and the caretaker.

The school was consecrated on 26–27 March 1996 by the Venerable Lopen Tse of Punakha Dratshang and opened under the principal Mr. Lekey Tshering, who remained until 2004. The school's Foundation Day was on 16 November 1996, with many guests and parents present.

== Developments and achievements ==
Since 1996, the school has developed and the dry, dusty campus has been transformed by strategic planting of trees and gardens, significantly improving the stability and beauty of the living environment. In 2002, Ugyen Academy opened on an adjacent site, between Khuruthang Middle Secondary School and Khuruthang town.

In 2004, Mrs. Haki Wanmo took over from Mr. Lekey Tshering as principal. In 2006, the 6th National School Games took place in the Punakha valley at three schools: Khuruthang Middle Secondary School, Ugyen Academy and Punakha Higher Secondary School, with 764 students taking part from about 140 schools.

In 2008 the school became a UNESCO Associated School and has an active UNESCO club. The school was rated in the top ten primary schools in Bhutan in 2009. In 2010 the Bhutan Ministry of Education introduced a Performance Management System to rank schools, and Khuruthang Middle Secondary School was placed fourth in the list of top primary schools.

In 2014 the school was selected as one of the six pilot schools in Bhutan's innovative iSchool Project, an initiative to use high speed internet and video conferencing to enable top quality teachers to teach pupils on many sites simultaneously. The technology includes interactive question-and-answer facilities, plus downloadable recordings held in an archive at a data centre in DrukNet for students who miss any of the lessons.
